= Benedict (given name) =

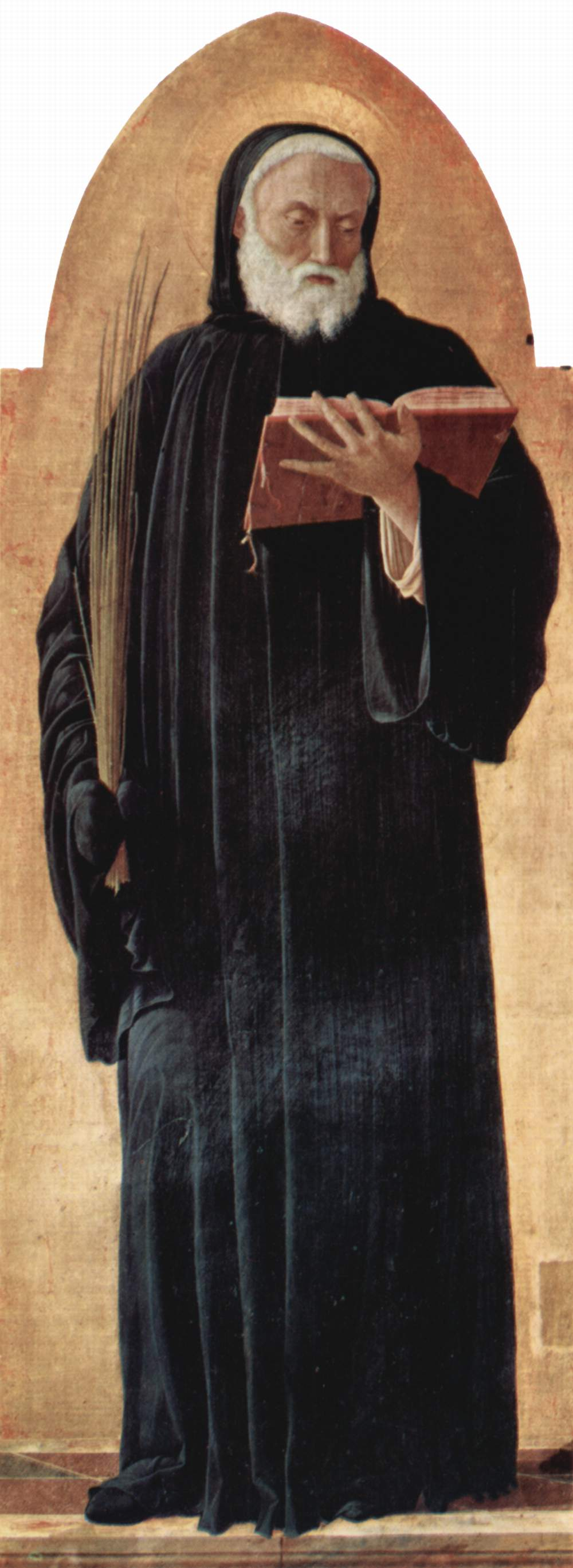
- Saint Benedict of Nursia
- Gender: Masculine

Origin
- Origin: Latin
- Meaning: "Blessed"

Other names
- Nicknames: Ben, Benny, Bendy, Benno, Ned
- Related names: Baruch, Benedetto, Benediktas, Bengt, Benicio, Benito, Bento

Benedict is a masculine given name of Latin origin, meaning "blessed". Etymologically, it is derived from the Latin words bene ('good') and dicere ('speak'), i.e. "well spoken". The name was borne by Saint Benedict of Nursia (480–547), often called the founder of Western Christian monasticism.

== Forms of Benedict in different languages ==
- Aragonese: Benedet
- Belarusian: Бэнэдыкт (Benedikt), Беніадзік (Beniadzik)
- Bulgarian: Бенедикт (Benedikt)
- Croatian: Benedikt, Benko
- Czech: Benedikt, Beneš
- Danish: Benedikt, Benedikte, Bendt, Bent
- Dutch: Benedict, Benedictus
- English: Benedict, Bennett
- Esperanto: Benedikto
- Finnish: Pentti
- French: Bénédict, Benoist, Benoît; Bénédicte, Benoîte (female)
- Frisian: Bendiks, Benedir
- German: Benedikt
- Greek: Βενέδικτος (Venediktos)
- Hungarian: Benedek
- Icelandic: Benedikt
- Indonesian: Benediktus
- Irish: Beinidict
- Italian: Benedetto, Benetto; Benedetta (female)
- Latin: Benedictus; Benedicta (female)
- Latvian: Benedikts, Bendiks
- Lithuanian: Benediktas
- Macedonian: Бенедикт (Benedikt)
- Norwegian: Bendik, Benedikt, Bengt
- Polish: Benedykt
- Portuguese: Bento, Benedito; Benedita (female)
- Provençal: Bénézet
- Romanian: Benedict
- Russian: Венедикт (Venedikt), Бенедикт (Benedikt)
- Serbian: Бенедикт (Benedikt)
- Slovak: Benedikt, Beňadik
- Slovenian: Benedikt
- Spanish: Benedicto, Benito
- Swedish: Benedikt, Bengt, Benkt
- Ukrainian: Бенедикт (Benedykt)
- Welsh: Benedet
- Yiddish: Bendich, Benesh, Bendit

== List of people with the given name Benedict, Bénédict, or Bennedict ==
For a complete list, see,, or.

See also Benedikt.

=== Saints ===
- Benedict of Nursia (480–547), Italian monk, founder of the Benedictine order of monasticism
- Benedict of Aniane (747–821), Benedictine monk and monastic reformer
- Benedict Biscop (628–690), Anglo-Saxon abbot
- Benedict (bishop of Milan) (died 732), archbishop of Milan
- Benedict of Szkalka (died 1012), Hungarian Benedictine monk
- Benedict the Bridge-Builder (c. 1163 – 1184), also known as Bénézet
- Benedict the Moor (1526–1589), also known as Benedict the Black
- Benedict Joseph Labre (1748–1783), French Franciscan mendicant
- Benedict Menni (1841–1914), Italian priest

=== Popes and antipopes ===
- Pope Benedict I (died 579), pope from 575 to 579
- Pope Benedict II (635–685), pope in 684/685, also a saint
- Pope Benedict III (died 858), pope from 855 to 858
- Pope Benedict IV (died 903), pope from 900 to 903
- Pope Benedict V (died 965), pope in 964, in opposition to Pope Leo VIII
- Pope Benedict VI (died 974), pope in 973/974
- Pope Benedict VII (died 983), pope from 974 to 983
- Pope Benedict VIII (died 1024), pope from 1012 to 1024
- Pope Benedict IX (c. 1010 – 1056), pope on three occasions between 1032 and 1048
- Antipope Benedict X (c. 1000 – c. 1070)
- Pope Benedict XI (1240–1304), pope from 1303 to 1304
- Pope Benedict XII (c. 1280 – 1342), pope from 1334 to 1342
- Antipope Benedict XIII (1328–1423)
- Antipope Benedict XIV, the name used by two closely related minor antipopes of the 15th century
- Pope Benedict XIII (1649–1730), pope from 1724 to 1730
- Pope Benedict XIV (1675–1758), pope from 1740 to 1758
- Pope Benedict XV (1854–1922), pope from 1914 to 1922
- Pope Benedict XVI (1927–2022), pope from 2005 to 2013

=== Other ===
- Benedict (archbishop of Edessa) (fl. urished c.1098–1104), first archbishop of Edessa of the Latin rite
- Benedict (canon of St. Peter's) (12th century), religious and liturgical writer of Rome
- Benedict of Bari (fl. 1227), monk and religious author
- Benedict of Poland (1200–1280), Polish Franciscan friar, traveler, explorer, and interpreter
- Benedict I of Jerusalem (1892–1980), Greek Orthodox Patriarch of Jerusalem
- Benedict de Spinoza (1632–1677), Dutch philosopher of Portuguese Sephardi descent
- Benedict Akwuegbu (born 1974), Nigerian footballer
- Benedict Anderson (1936–2015), Irish political scientist and historian of South East Asia
- Benedict Anton Aufschnaiter (1665–1742), Austrian Baroque composer
- Benedict Arnold (1741–1801), American general who after 1779 shifted his allegiance to the British
- Benedict Arnold (congressman) (1789–1849), American politician from New York
- Benedict Balansa (1825–1891), French botanist
- Benedict Birnberg (1930–2023), British solicitor and human rights campaigner
- Benedict Blythe (2016-2021), British child, namesake of Benedict's Law
- Benedict Campbell (born 1957), Canadian actor
- Benedict Chifley (1885–1951), Australian Prime Minister
- Benedict Cumberbatch (born 1976), English actor
- Benedict Daswa (1946–1990), South African school principal and mob murder victim
- Benedykt Dobszewicz (1722-1792), Lithuanian philosopher and physicist
- Benedict Erofeev (1938–1990), Russian writer and Soviet dissident
- Benedict Fogelberg (1786–1854), Swedish sculptor
- Benedict Friedlaender (1866–1908), German zoologist and sexologist
- Benedict Goëz (1562–1697), Portuguese Jesuit missionary and explorer (Bento de Góis)
- Benedict Gregorios (1916–1994), Metropolitan Archbishop of the Malankara Church
- Benedict Gross (born 1950), American mathematician
- Benedict Iroha (born 1969), Nigerian footballer
- Benedict Jackson (born 1967), English golfer
- Benedict Kiely (1919–2007), Irish writer and broadcaster
- Benedict F. Kiernan (born 1953), American historian
- Bennedict Mathurin (born 2002), Canadian basketball player
- Benedict McCarthy (born 1977), South African footballer
- Benedict Morel (1809–1873), French psychiatrist
- Benedict Samuel (born 1988), Australian actor
- Benedict Stilling (1810–1879), German anatomist and surgeon
- Benedict Wallet Vilakazi (1906–1947), South African poet, novelist, and educator
- Benedict Wells (born 1984), German-Swiss novelist
- Benedict Wong (born 1971), English actor

=== Fictional characters ===
- Benedict, a chicken villager from the Animal Crossing series
- Benedick, a character from Shakespeare's Much Ado About Nothing
- Benedict of Amber, from the Chronicles of Amber
- Bénédict, the title character in Berlioz's opera Béatrice et Bénédict
- Benedict Bridgerton, a character in the period drama Bridgerton, as well as the novels the television series is based on
