= Benediktas =

- Gender: Male
- Language: Lithuanian
- Name day: 21 March

Origin
- Origin: Latin
- Meaning: "well spoken"
- Region of origin: Lithuania

Other names
- Nickname: Benas
- Derived: from the Latin bene ('good') and dicte ('speak')
- Related names: Benedict, Benedikt, Benoît, Baruch, Benedetto, Bengt, Benito

Benediktas is a Lithuanian masculine given name, derived from the Latin name "Benedictus", which itself is derived from the Latin compound bene ('good') and dicte ('speak'), i.e. "well spoken". Individuals bearing the name Benediktas include:

- Benediktas Mikulis (1920–2000), Lithuanian partisan
- Benediktas Vilmantas Rupeika (born 1944), Lithuanian politician
- Benediktas Vanagas (born 1977), Lithuanian rally driver
