= Benedictus Deus =

Benedictus Deus may refer to:

- Benedictus Deus (Benedict XII), a papal bull of 1336
- Benedictus Deus (Pius IV), a papal bull of 1564
- Benedictus Deus (Benedict XIV), a papal bull of 1750
- Benedictus Deus, a papal bull issued by Pope Gregory XVI in 1834 confirming the decisions on Roman Catholic diocesan boundaries in the United States decided by the Second Provincial Council of Baltimore

== See also ==
- Benedictus (disambiguation)
