= Benedetta =

Benedetta is a feminine given name of Italian origin, the feminine equivalent of the masculine name Benedetto, a cognate of Benedict. Notable people with the given name include:

- Benedetta Barzini (born 1943), Italian actress and model
- Benedetta Berti, scholar of international relations, an expert on militant groups
- Benedetta Bianchi Porro (1936–1964), Italian Roman Catholic
- Benedetta of Cagliari (1194–1233), medieval ruler of Caligiari, Sardinia
- Benedetta Cambiagio Frassinello (1791–1858), Italian missionary, founder of the Benedictine Sisters of Providence, saint in the Roman Catholic Church
- Benedetta Cappa (1897–1977), Italian Futurist artist and wife of Filippo Tommaso Marinetti
- Benedetta Carlini (1591–1661), Catholic mystic and lesbian nun in Counter-Reformation Italy
- Benedetta Ceccarelli (born 1980), Italian hurdler
- Benedetta Cimatti (born 1989), Italian actress
- Benedetta Gargari (born 1995), Italian actress
- Benedetta Gava (born 2009), Italian artistic gymnast
- Benedetta Moresco (born 2001), Italian golfer
- Benedetta Orsi (born 2000), Italian footballer
- Benedetta Rosmunda Pisaroni (1793–1872), Italian opera diva
- Benedetta Sartori (born 2001), Italian volleyball player
- Benedetta Scuderi (born 1991), Italian politician
- Benedetta Tagliabue (born 1963), Italian architect
- Benedetta Valanzano (born 1985), Italian film and television actress
- Benedetta Wenzel (born 1997), German field hockey player

== See also ==
- Benedetta (film), a 2021 French and Dutch biographical drama film
- Valle Benedetta, fraction of Livorno, Tuscany in Italy
