= Pentti =

Pentti is a Finnish male given name and a surname, a form of Bengt (Swedish for Benedict). Pentti was a very popular name in 1920–1950's. In 1924–1953 it was given to more than 1000 boys in Finland every year.

The name Pentti is also used in fiction and music.

== A–J ==
- Pentti Aalto (1917–1998), Finnish linguist
- Pentti Alonen (1925–2017), Finnish alpine skier
- Pentti Antila (1926–1997), Finnish agronomist and politician
- Pentti Arajärvi (born 1948), Finnish academic and politician
- Pentti Elo (1929–1991), Finnish hockey player
- Pentti Eskola (1883–1964), Finnish geologist
- Pentti Forsman (1917–2006), Finnish tennis player
- Pentti Glan (1946–2017), Finnish-Canadian rock drummer
- Pentti Haanpää (1905–1955), Finnish author
- Pentti Hakkarainen (disambiguation), multiple people
- Pentti Hämäläinen (1929–1984), Finnish boxer
- Pentti Hämäläinen (bandy) (1927–2012), Finnish bandy player
- Pentti Hiidenheimo (1875–1918), Finnish politician
- Pentti Holappa (1927–2017), Finnish politician
- Pentti Ikonen (1934–2007), Finnish swimmer
- Pentti Irjala (1911–1982), Finnish actor
- Pentti Isotalo (1927–2021), Finnish ice hockey player

== K–P ==
- Pentti Kahma (born 1943), Finnish discus thrower
- Pentti Karvonen (1931–2022), Finnish athlete
- Pentti Kaskipuro (1930–2010), Finnish artist
- Pentti Kokkonen (born 1955), Finnish ski jumper
- Pentti Kontula (1930–1987), Finnish boxer
- Pentti Korhonen (born 1951), Finnish motorcycle racer
- Pentti Koskela (1945–2024), Finnish ice hockey player
- Pentti Kotvio (1921–2001), Finnish weightlifter
- Pentti Kouri (1949–2009), Finnish economist
- Pentti Kuukasjärvi (born 1946), Finnish athlete
- Pentti Laaksonen (1929–2005), Finnish basketball player
- Pentti Lammio (1919–1999), Finnish speed skater
- Pentti Linkola (1932–2020), Finnish ecologist
- Pentti Linnosvuo (1933–2010), Finnish sport shooter
- Pentti Lund (1925–2013), Finnish Canadian ice hockey
- Pentti Matikainen (1950–2025), Finnish ice hockey coach and manager
- Pentti Niemi (1902–1962), Finnish Lutheran clergyman and politician
- Pentti Niinivuori (1931–1988), Finnish boxer
- Pentti Nikula (1939–2025), Finnish pole vaulter
- Pentti Oinonen (born 1952), Finnish politician
- Pentti Paatsalo (1932–1996), Finnish swimmer
- Pentti Pakarinen (1924–2007), Finnish ophthalmologist and politician
- Pentti Papinaho (1926–1992), Finnish sculptor
- Pentti Pekkarinen (1917–1975), Finnish politician
- Pentti Pelkonen (born 1930), Finnish skier
- Pentti Pesonen (1938–2024), Finnish cross-country skier
- Pentti Pouttu (died 1597), Finnish–Swedish peasant rebellion leader
- Pentti Punkari (born 1938), Finnish wrestler

== R–Z ==
- Pentti Raaskoski (1929–2014), Finnish sprint canoer
- Pentti Rekola (1934–2012), Finnish athlete
- Pentti Repo (1930–1997), Finnish athlete
- Pentti Rummakko (1943–2008), Finnish athlete
- Pentti Saarman (1941–2021), Finnish boxer
- Pentti Saikkonen (born 1952), Finnish statistician
- Pentti Salo (born 1941), Finnish wrestler
- Pentti Sammallahti (born 1950), Finnish photographer
- Pentti Siimes (1929–2016), Finnish actor
- Pentti Siltaloppi (1917–2002), Finnish athlete
- Pentti Sinersaari (born 1956), Finnish athlete
- Pentti Snellman (1926–2007), Finnish athlete
- Pentti Suomela (1917–2016), Finnish diplomat
- Pentti Talvitie (1922–2003), Finnish diplomat
- Pentti Taskinen (1929–1973), Finnish biathlete
- Pentti Tiusanen (1949–2018), Finnish politician
- Pentti Väänänen (1945–2020), Finnish politician
- Pentti Vikström (born 1951), Finnish archer
- Pentti Virrankoski (1929–2023), Finnish historian

== Surname ==
- Eino Pentti (1906–1993), American athlete
- Helmi Arneberg-Pentti (1889-1981), chairman of Lotta Svärd, Finnish auxiliary organisation for women in 1920s.
