= Pentti Hakkarainen =

Pentti Hakkarainen may refer to one of the following:

- Pentti Hakkarainen (psychologist), (1944–2021), Lithuanian educational psychologist
- Pentti Kalevi Hakkarainen, Finnish banker

== See also ==
- Hakkarainen (disambiguation)
