= C. benedictus =

C. benedictus may refer to:

- Carduus benedictus, a thistle used as food plants by the larvae of some Lepidoptera species
- Cnicus benedictus, a thistle native to the Mediterranean region

== See also ==
- Benedictus (disambiguation)
