= Papal Jews =

Jewish community who lived under Papal rule

French: Juifs du pape; Occitan: Jueus del Pap; Hebrew: יהודי האפיפיור
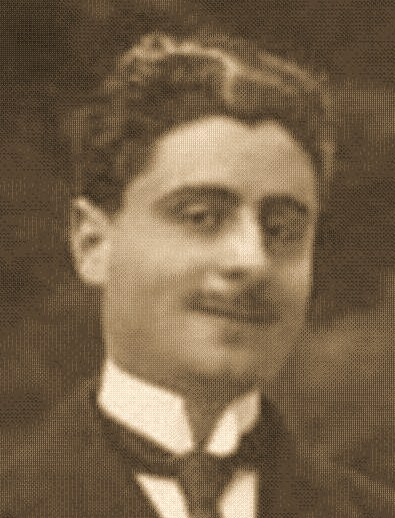
- Armand Lunel, last speaker of Judeo-Provençal

Regions with significant populations
- Comtat Venaissin (until 1791)

Languages
- Judeo-Provençal

Religion
- Judaism

Related ethnic groups
- Sephardic Jews, Ashkenazi Jews

Papal Jews, Pope's Jews (French: Juifs du pape, Occitan: Jueus del Pap, Hebrew: יהודי האפיפיור, romanized: Yehudei Ha'Apifyor or Hebrew: בני גולה, romanized: Bnei Gola), Avignonese Jews, also known by their pre-Revolution name Comtadin Jews (French: Juifs comtadins, Occitan: Jueus Contadièrs) lived in the Comtat Venaissin and in Avignon, ceded respectively in 1274 and 1348 to the Holy See and remaining under its administration until the French Revolution in 1791. Along with the Alsatian Jews, they formed for several centuries one of the only two Jewish communities authorised to live on what is today French territory, but which at the time of their establishment lay outside the borders of the Kingdom of France.

== Avignon Papacy ==
In the 14th century, the popes resided in Avignon, where the presence of the papal court fostered Jewish activity, despite an attempt to expel them. In 1322, John XXII expelled the Jews from Avignon and the Comtat, forcing them to take refuge in Dauphiné and Savoy. To complete the expulsion, the pope deemed it necessary to have the synagogues of Bédarrides, Bollène, Carpentras, Le Thor, Malaucène, Monteux, and Pernes torn down. This expulsion was short-lived, as the same pope, in 1326 at the Council of Avignon, imposed the yellow badge (rouelle) on Jewish boys from the age of fourteen, and required girls from the age of twelve to wear a distinctive veil (cornalia or cornu).

From 1326 onwards, the popes allowed Jews to reside in the Comtat and in Avignon without being persecuted, enabling many Jews from France to escape the persecutions they were facing. Moreover, Clement VI protected the Jews during the massacres linked to the Black Death. In 1394, Jews were definitively expelled from the Kingdom of France. In the Comtat Venaissin, however, Jews could continue to reside under certain conditions: wearing a yellow hat, paying additional taxes, and attending mandatory sermons aimed at converting them, among others.

At the beginning of the Holy See's administration, their situation was entirely comparable to that of other Provençal Jews. For example, as elsewhere in Provence, many doctors were Jewish: in Avignon in 1374, there were six Jewish doctors, whose salaries were, per the 1341 council, significantly lower than those of Christian doctors. The Jewish quarter of Avignon covered no more than one hectare (2.5 acres) but housed 1,000 people in 1358.

During the period of papal residence in Avignon, Jewish trade remained prosperous. Jewish merchants supplied the papal court with food, cloth, horses, perfumes, coral jewellery, and pearl rosaries. The tailor of Gregory XI was a Jew. In 1374, 87 of the city's 94 cloth merchants were Jewish. There were also a few moneylenders.

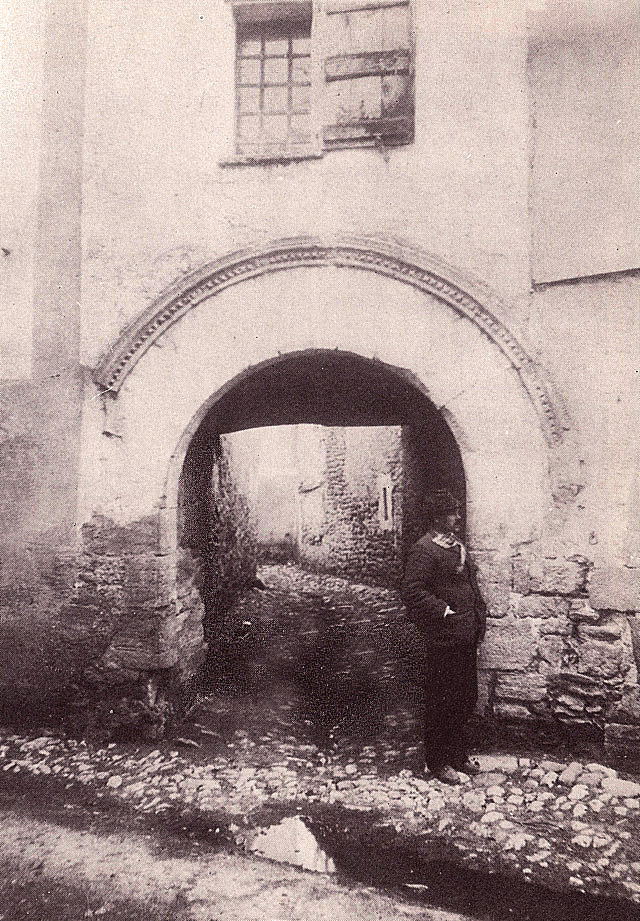
Door of the old Jewish quarter of Malaucène destroyed on the orders of John XXII

== Quarters ==
In 1492, the Jews were expelled from Spain, but Pope Alexander VI forbade them from entering Avignon and the Comtat. Then, in the early 16th century, Jews were expelled from Provence, and this time, many, particularly from Arles and Tarascon, were able to seek refuge in the Comtat. Around a dozen towns and villages hosted Jewish communities at that point. In Pernes-les-Fontaines, a segregation measure was adopted in 1504, requiring Jews to abandon their homes and gather in a designated "carrière" (Jewish quarter).

Although the expulsion of Jews from the Papal States in 1569 was only partially enforced, from the late 16th century onwards Jews were obliged to settle in one of the four quarters of the Comtat—a small, clearly demarcated neighbourhood of a few streets, closed off each evening. These were the Arba Kehilot, or the four holy communities of Avignon, Carpentras, Cavaillon, and L'Isle-sur-la-Sorgue—named after the four holy cities of the Holy Land: Jerusalem, Hebron, Safed, and Tiberias.

From the 15th century, Jewish communities were administered by bailons (meaning "regent, chief, or authority figure"). These officials were responsible for their community before the authorities and handled policing duties. Taxation was based on property wealth. Jewish commercial activities, especially in textiles, faced various restrictions.

The Papal Jews were never numerous: around 2,000 in total at the start of the 16th century, and about 500 in Avignon and Carpentras c. 1600. The ghetto of L'Isle-sur-la-Sorgue was located in a cul-de-sac covering 2,500 m^{2} (27,000 sq ft). In these ghettos, houses were built up to 4–5 storeys to save space, often at the expense of structural safety: in Avignon in 1314, a house collapsed during a wedding celebration, killing 23 people.

Thomas Platter described the ghetto of Avignon in 1595 as nothing more than a street closed at both ends. He noted that most Jews worked as tailors, whereas in the Middle Ages, their professions were more diverse and not distinct from those of other inhabitants of Avignon. Some were doctors or even tenant farmers. The synagogue was located in a kind of basement. Jews could only leave the ghetto during the day, and only when wearing special clothing, including a yellow hat. In Carpentras, where the ghetto was smaller and more densely populated than in Avignon, buildings could reach seven or eight storeys.

The repeated imposition of restrictive measures over the centuries—bans on practising medicine, owning property outside their quarter, trading in new goods, foodstuffs, or horses—suggests that such regulations were in practice only partially enforced. The Pope's Jews appear to have maintained good relations with their Christian neighbours. From the late 17th century onwards, some were authorised to settle in the Kingdom of France, such as Israël Bernard de Valabrègue, who became an interpreter at the Royal Library in Paris.

=== Religion and language ===
Along the history, an original Comtadin form of Judaism developed, distinct from both the Sephardic and the Ashkenazi traditions. Though, some claim otherwise. It was marked by a highly structured community organisation, strict endogamy, and a unique ritual practice. The Jews spoke Judeo-Provençal. Religious services appear to have been well attended: in the Judeo-Comtadin comedy Harcanot et Barcanot, one topic of interest among the women is who missed a prayer service: S'un tan a pas manca ni minha ni arvit ("if so-and-so didn't miss the minḥa (afternoon) or arvit (evening) prayer"). However, it seems that the Jewish community of L'Isle-sur-la-Sorgue had already disappeared before the French Revolution.

During the 18th century, the economic situation of the Jews improved. They travelled extensively throughout southern France, with some settling semi-permanently in cities like Nîmes and Montpellier. The use of French became more widespread. In 1741, the synagogue of Carpentras was rebuilt. Though this synagogue, like that of Cavaillon, remained discreet from the outside, the new prosperity was reflected in the prayer hall, a masterpiece of Italian-style decoration and wrought ironwork. However, daily life did not reflect the increasing wealth of Jews, who were still not permitted to live outside the overcrowded quarters, where six- or seven-storey houses appeared to arriving travellers in Carpentras as virtual skyscrapers. It was only in 1784 that a café owner in Carpentras was authorised to serve Jewish customers.

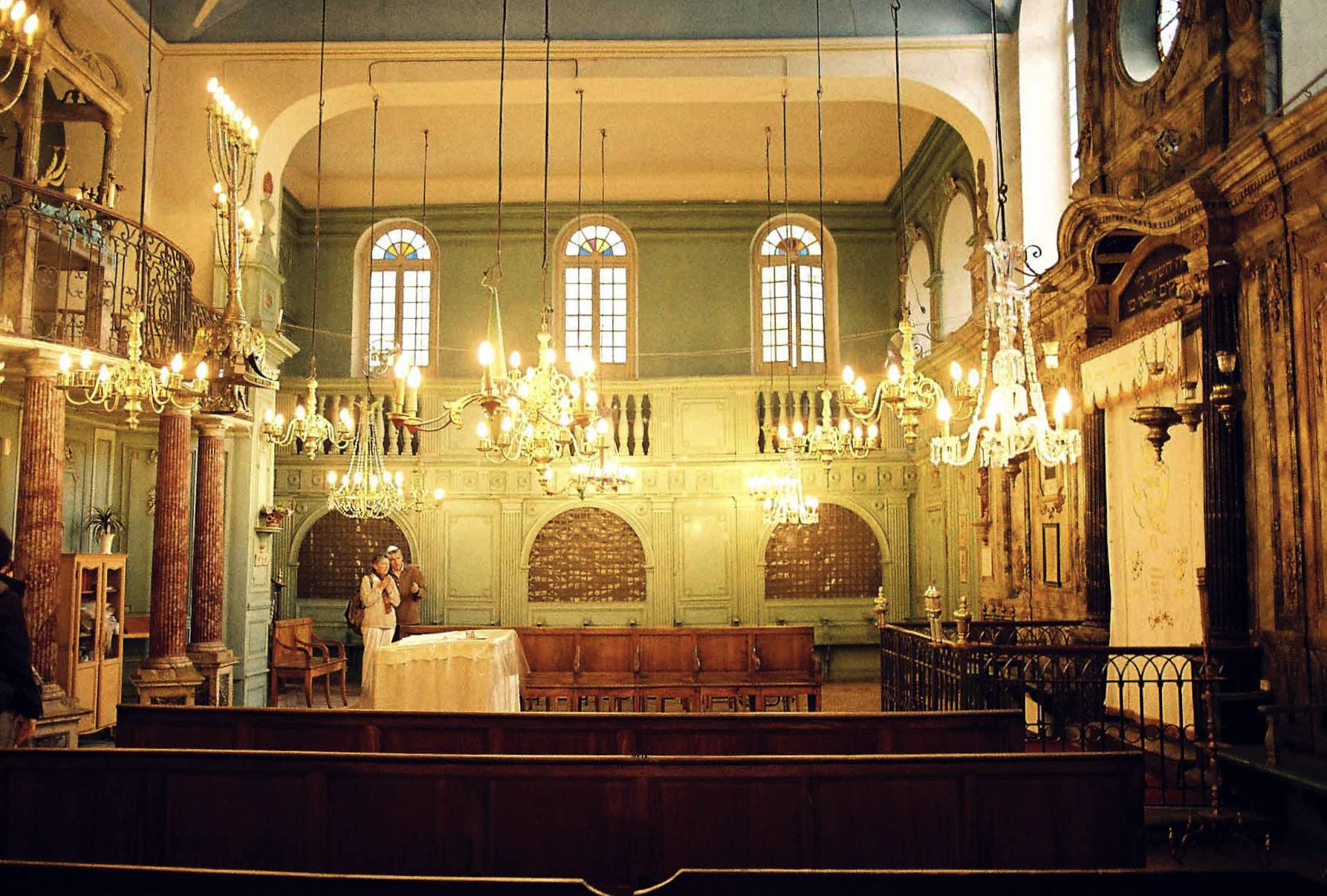
Synagogue of Carpentras, the oldest synagogue in France in use today

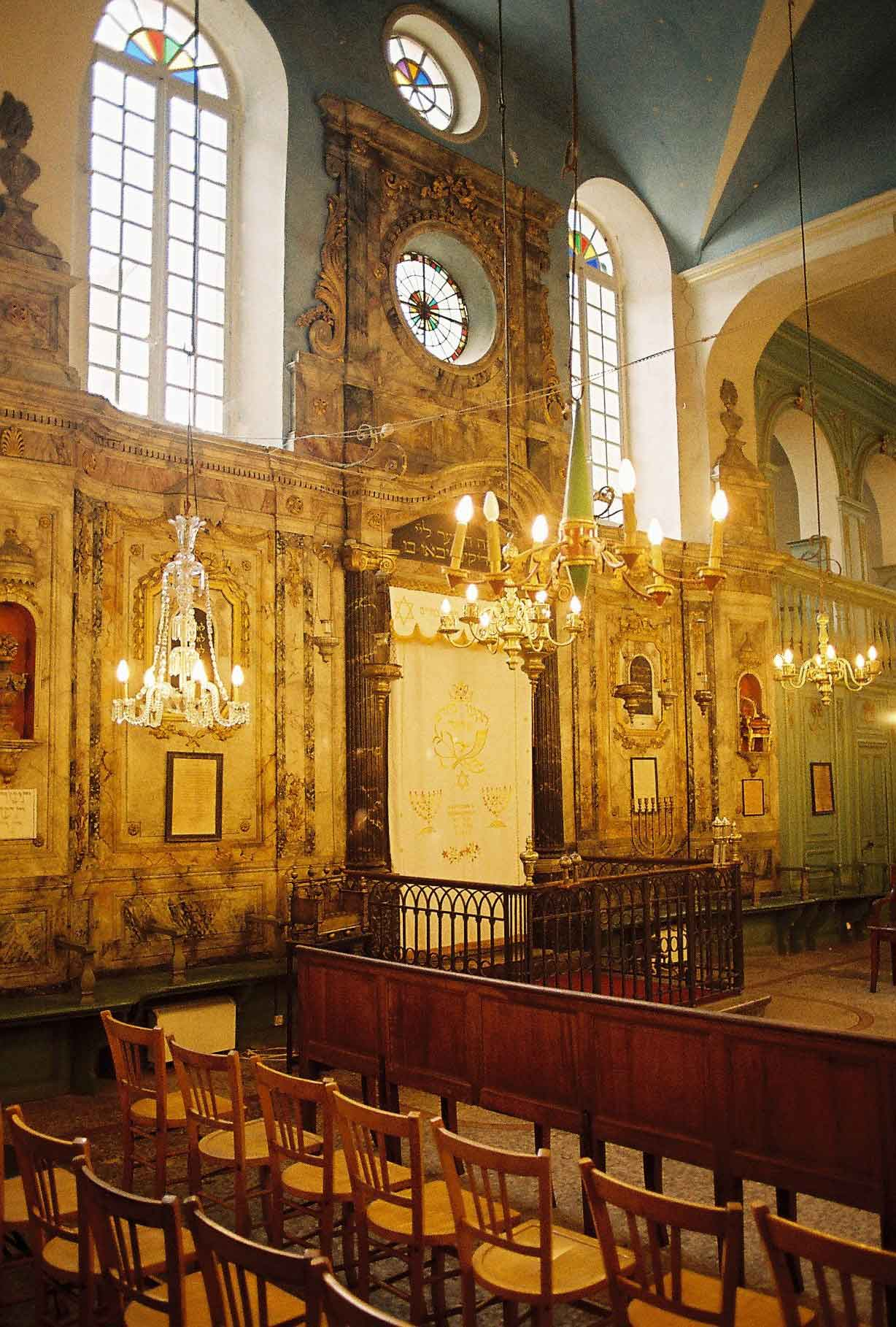
Torah Ark of Synagogue of Carpentras

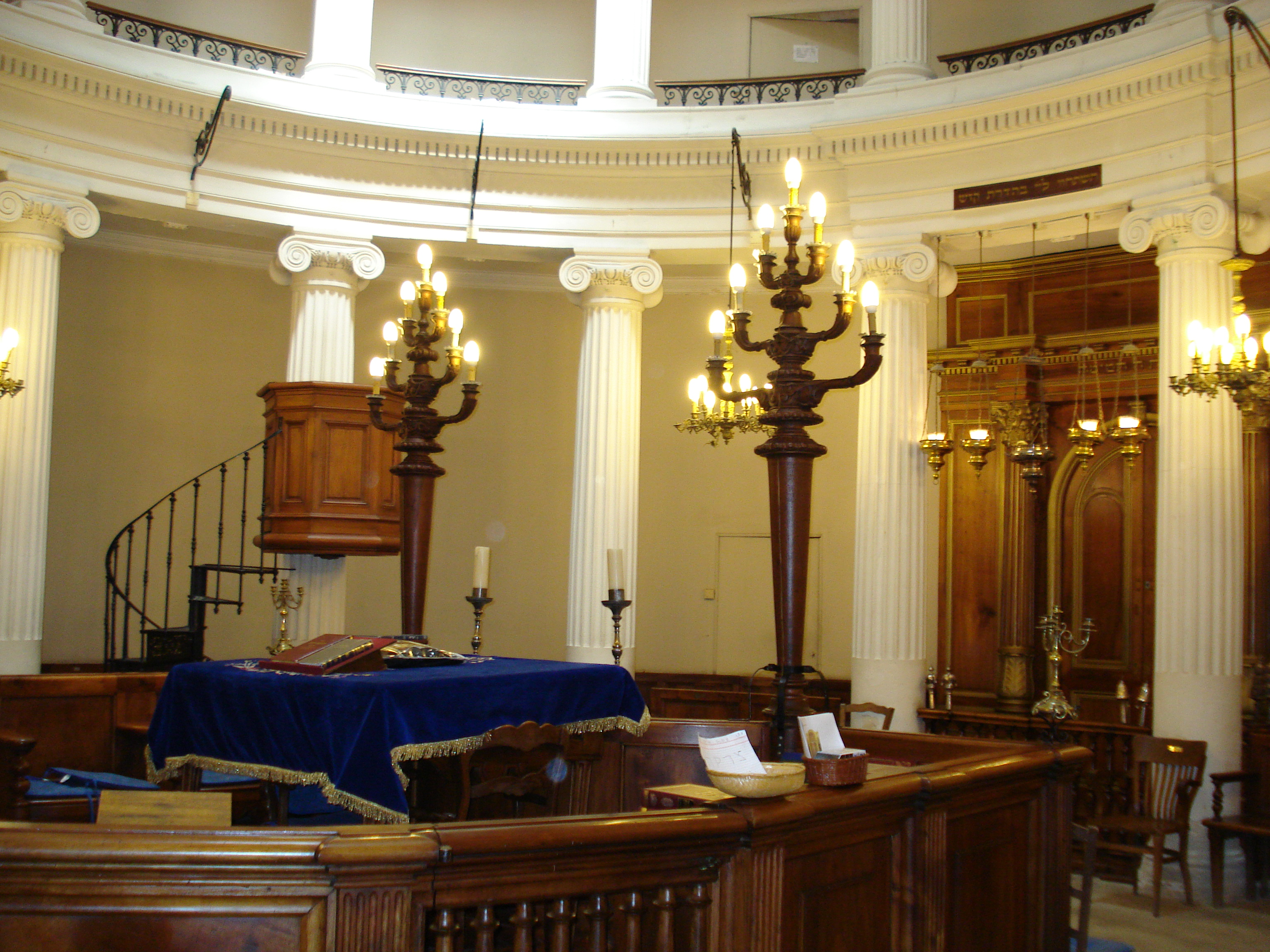
Interior of the Synagogue of Avignon

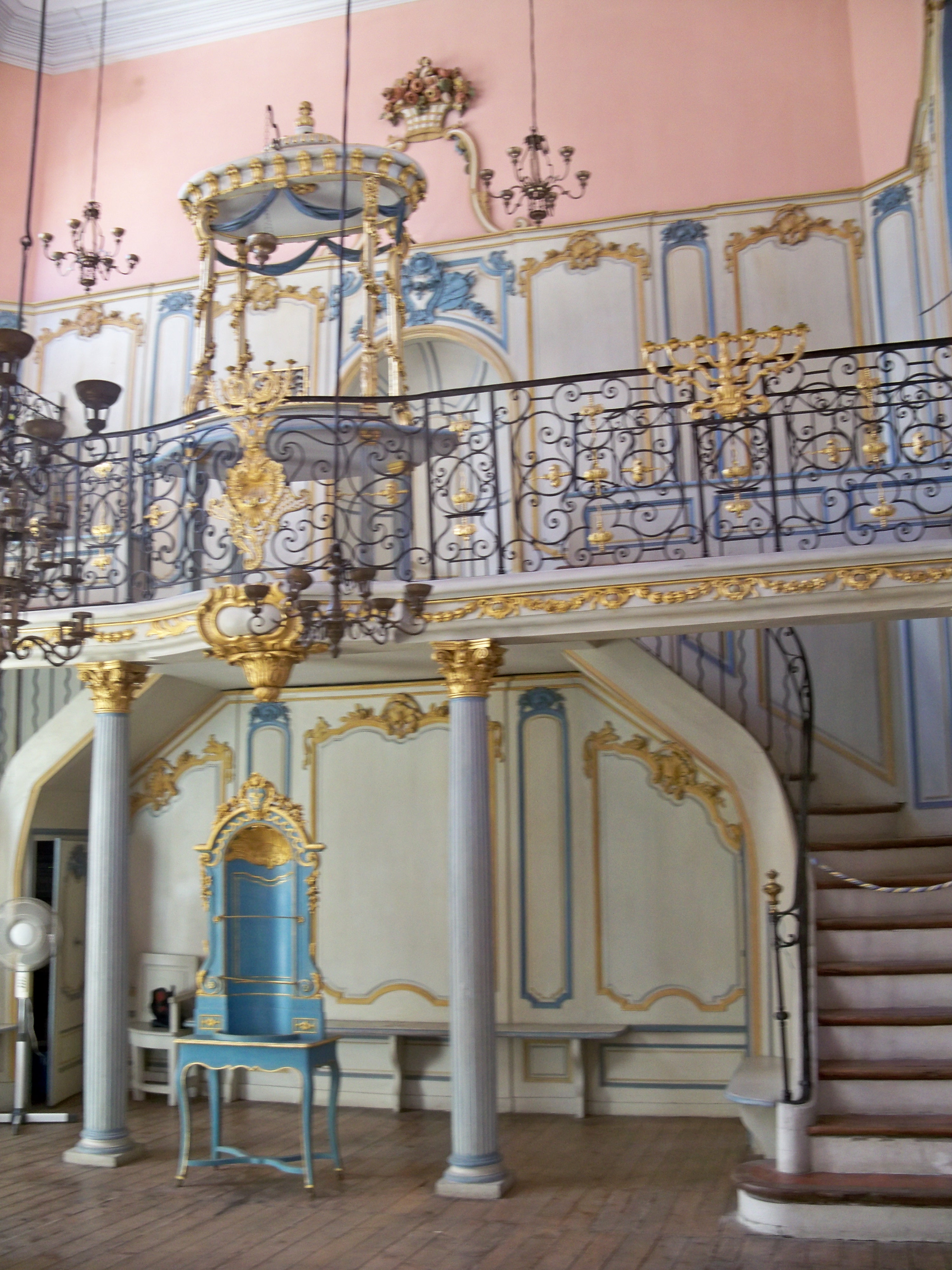
Synagogue of Cavaillon

== French Revolution ==
With the French Revolution, despite some mild opposition by people like Jean-Sifrein Maury, Papal Jews became French citizens. Within a few years, the quarters emptied out, even some Ashkenazi Jews arrived. Jews took an active role in the revolutionary events, particularly in Nîmes, and dispersed throughout the major cities of southern France, reaching as far as Paris. Dormant for a century and a half, the Jewish communities of Avignon and Carpentras experienced a revival after 1962, with the arrival of Jews repatriated from Algeria. The synagogue of Carpentras, rebuilt in the 18th century on 14th-century foundations, is today the oldest synagogue in France still in use.

== Prominent figures ==
After the emancipation of the Jews, descendants of these communities played an active role in French society and distinguished themselves in various fields. In politics, Adolphe Crémieux (1796–1880) granted French nationality to the Jews of Algeria (Crémieux Decree); Alfred Naquet (1834–1916), deputy and later senator for Vaucluse in the early Third Republic, introduced legislation on divorce. Jassuda Bédarrides (1804–1882), jurist and politician, was the first Jewish lawyer in the history of the Aix-en-Provence bar and the city's first Jewish mayor. Joseph-Elzéar Morenas from Saint-Christol-d'Albion was one of the most prominent French abolitionists.

In art and culture, notable figures included writer Bernard Lazare (1865–1903), one of Captain Dreyfus' principal defenders; Armand Lunel (1892–1977), the last speaker of Judeo-Provençal and chronicler of Comtadin Judaism; composer Darius Milhaud (1892–1974); conductor Pierre Monteux (1875–1964); entrepreneur Gaston Cavaillon (1910–1986); historian Pierre Vidal-Naquet (1930–2006); and infectious disease specialist and academic Anne-Claude Crémieux.

== Bibliography ==
- R. de Maulde, « Les Juifs dans les États français du Saint-Siège au Moyen Âge », in Bulletin historique et archéologique de Vaucluse, 1879, p. 56-74, p. 155-169, p. 191-205, p. 259-266, p. 314-324
- Léon Bardinet, « De la condition civile des Juifs du Comtat Venaissin pendant le séjour des papes d'Avignon (1309 – 1376) », dans Revue Historique, volume 12, January–April 1880, p. 1-47 (lire en ligne).
- Léon Bardinet, « Les Juifs du Comtat Venaissin au Moyen Âge. Leur rôle économique et intellectuel », dans Revue Historique, volume 14, September–December 1880, p. 1-60 (lire en ligne).
- C. Faure, Études sur l'administration et l'histoire du Comtat Venaissin du 13th au 14th century (1229 – 1417), Paris-Avignon, 1909.
- A. Mossé, Histoire des juifs d'Avignon et du Comtat Venaissin, Paris, 1934.
- Blumenkranz, Bernhard (1972). Histoire des Juifs en France. Privat, Éditeur, Toulouse.
- Michel Hayez, Anne-Marie Hayez, « Juifs d'Avignon au tribunal de la cour temporelle sous Urbain V », in Provence historique, 1973, volume 23, fascicule 93-94, p. 165-173 (lire en ligne)
- Lunel, Armand (1975). Juifs du Languedoc, de la Provence, et des États français du pape. Albin Michel. ISBN 2226002359.
- Georges BRUN, les juifs du pape à Carpentras, éditions le nombre d'or, April 1975
- Philippe Prévot, Histoire du ghetto d'Avignon, Éd. Aubanel, Avignon, 1975, ISBN 978-2-70060-056-8
- David Feuerwerker, L'Émancipation des Juifs en France. De l'Ancien Régime à la fin du Second Empire. Albin Michel, Paris, 1976 ISBN 2-226-00316-9
- Henri Dubled, Carpentras, CPM, 1981, ISBN 9782866730857 (read the extract online: « Les juifs et le Comtat Venaissin »)
- René Moulinas, Les Juifs du pape en France, Paris, 1981.
- René Moulinas, Les Juifs du pape, Éd. Albin Michel, Coll. Présence du Judaïsme, Paris, 1992.
- Roger Klotz, Armand Lunel et son univers imaginaire, Doctoral Thesis, 1991
- Simone Mrejen-O'Hana, « Pratiques et comportements religieux dans les 'quatre saintes communautés' d'Avignon et du Comtat Venaissin au 18th century », Archives juives 28/2, Paris, Liana Lévi, 1995, p. 4-19.
- Iancu, Danièle; Iancu, Carol (1995). Les Juifs du Midi: une histoire millénaire (in French). Avignon: Éditions A. Barthélemy. ISBN 2-87923-008-X.
- Simone Mrejen-O'Hana, La famille juive au 18th century d'après les registres 'paroissiaux' de Carpentras et du Comtat Venaissin: approaches sociodémographiques. Doctoral Thesis, University of Sorbonne, 1998.
- Florence Berceot, «Les élites juives du Sud-Est de la France au début de la Troisième République 1870-1905): une affaire de familles», in Bruno Dumons, Gilles Pollet (dir.), Élites et pouvoirs locaux, Presses universitaires de Lyon, 1999, p. 183-197. (lire en ligne)
- Simone Mrejen-O'Hana, « Les pinqassim [registres hébraïques] de Carpentras au regard du Saint-Siège, I. Le Séfer ha-yaḥas (1736-1769) d'Élie Crémieux », Bulletin du centre de recherche français de Jérusalem 16 (CRFJ/CNRS), 2005, p. 45-76.
- Simone Mrejen-O'Hana, Les sources hébraïques des « Juifs du pape », Études pluridisciplinaires, Thesis, Marc Bloch University, 2006.
- Simone Mrejen-O'Hana, « À propos de l'hébreu dans les 'quatre saintes communautés' du Comtat Venaissin et d'Avignon: lexique et grammaire », Revue des études juives, 167 (1-2), July–December 2008, p. 121-152.
- Simone Mrejen-O'Hana, [héb.] Le Registre d'Élie Crémieux de Carpentras: Éphémérides de la communauté juive de Carpentras (1736-1769). Édition scientifique annotée par Simone Mrejen-O'Hana, Jerusalem, Hebrew University of Jerusalem, Institut Ben Zvi, 2009, ISBN 978-965-342-962-8.
- Simone Mrejen-O'Hana, « Carpentras au 18th century - ville de mohalim », L'écriture de l'histoire juive. Mélanges en l'honneur de Gérard Nahon, ed. D. Iancu-Agou and C. Iancu, Paris-Louvain, Peeters, 2012, p. 473-496.
- Valérie Theis, « Jean XXII et l'expulsion des juifs du Comtat Venaissin », Annales. Histoire, Sciences Sociales, 2012/1, p. 41-77. DOI: 10.3917/anna.671.0041.
- Guy Pairoux, « La cinquième carrière ou la juiverie oubliée de Pernes », L'Écho des carrières n 91, April–June 2018.
- Aurélie Bonan, « Patrimoine juif d'Avignon et du Comtat », Parcours du Patrimoine n 425, Editions Lieux-Dits, Lyon, July 2019.
- Nahon, Peter (2023). Les parlers français des israélites du Midi. Strasbourg, Éditions de linguistique et de philologie. ISBN 978-2-37276-066-9.
