= Bento Gonçalves =

Bento Gonçalves (1788–1847) was a Brazilian general and the main rebel leader of the Ragamuffin War.

Bento Gonçalves may also refer to:

- Bento Gonçalves, Rio Grande do Sul, a town in the Brazilian state of Rio Grande do Sul, named after the general
- Clube Esportivo Bento Gonçalves, a Brazilian football club, named after the town
- Bento António Gonçalves (1902–1942), member of the Portuguese Communist Party

== See also ==
- Bento (name)
