= History of the Jews in Arles =

Arles was a major Jewish center between the Roman times and the Renaissance. Due to its location between Spain and the rest of Europe, with its proximity to the Mediterranean coast, Arles became a comfortable and sometimes beneficial city for the many Jews who lived in it. During the Middle Ages, many notable Jews were active in Arles, which functioned as a Jewish philosophy and Arabic-Hebrew-Latin translation center, as it was one of the town known for its Hachmei Provence. No Jewish community was evident in Arles ever since, even though some evidences of former Jewish life can be seen around town and in the local museum. The Jewish community ceased to prosper towards the end of the 15th century, until they were expelled in around the 1490s after which they did not return. Jews were to be found in Arles in the 1960s, though no community was ever evident again.

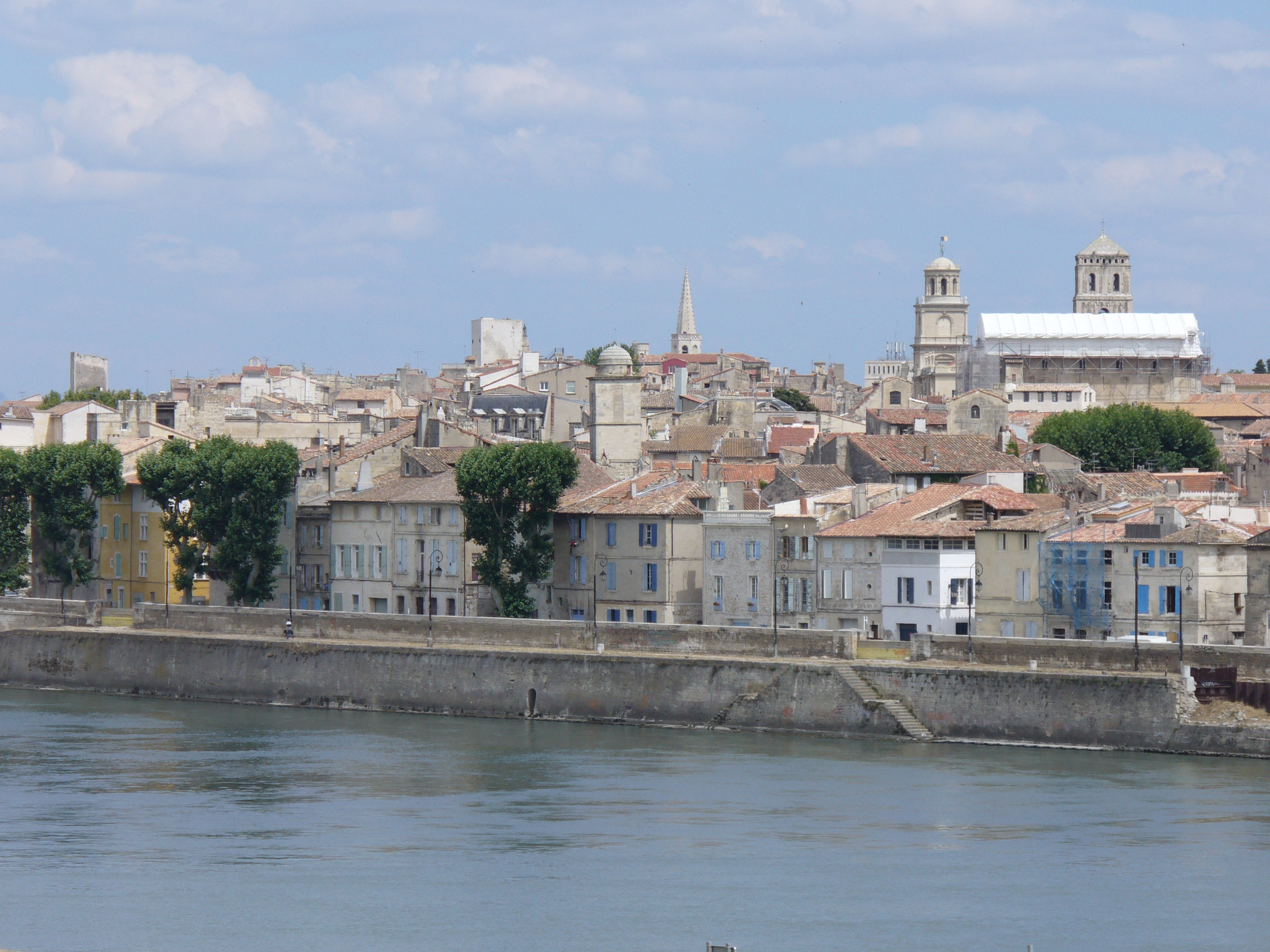
view of Arles

== History ==
=== Roman Empire ===
According to a legend, Roman emperor Vespasian placed Jewish exiles after the destruction of the Second Temple in Jerusalem on three ships that were abandoned by their captains. One of the vessels reached Arles, while the other two got to Bordeaux and to Lyon. This legend suggests the existence of Jews in Arles as early as the first century CE, yet the first document depicting Jewish life in Arles is due to 425 CE. On that year, emperor Valentinian III issued a decree addressed to the ecclesiastical bishops of the area, prohibiting local Jews of entering magistracy, possess Christian slaves or taking careers of arms. During the decline of the Roman Empire, Arles became an important Jewish political and religious center.

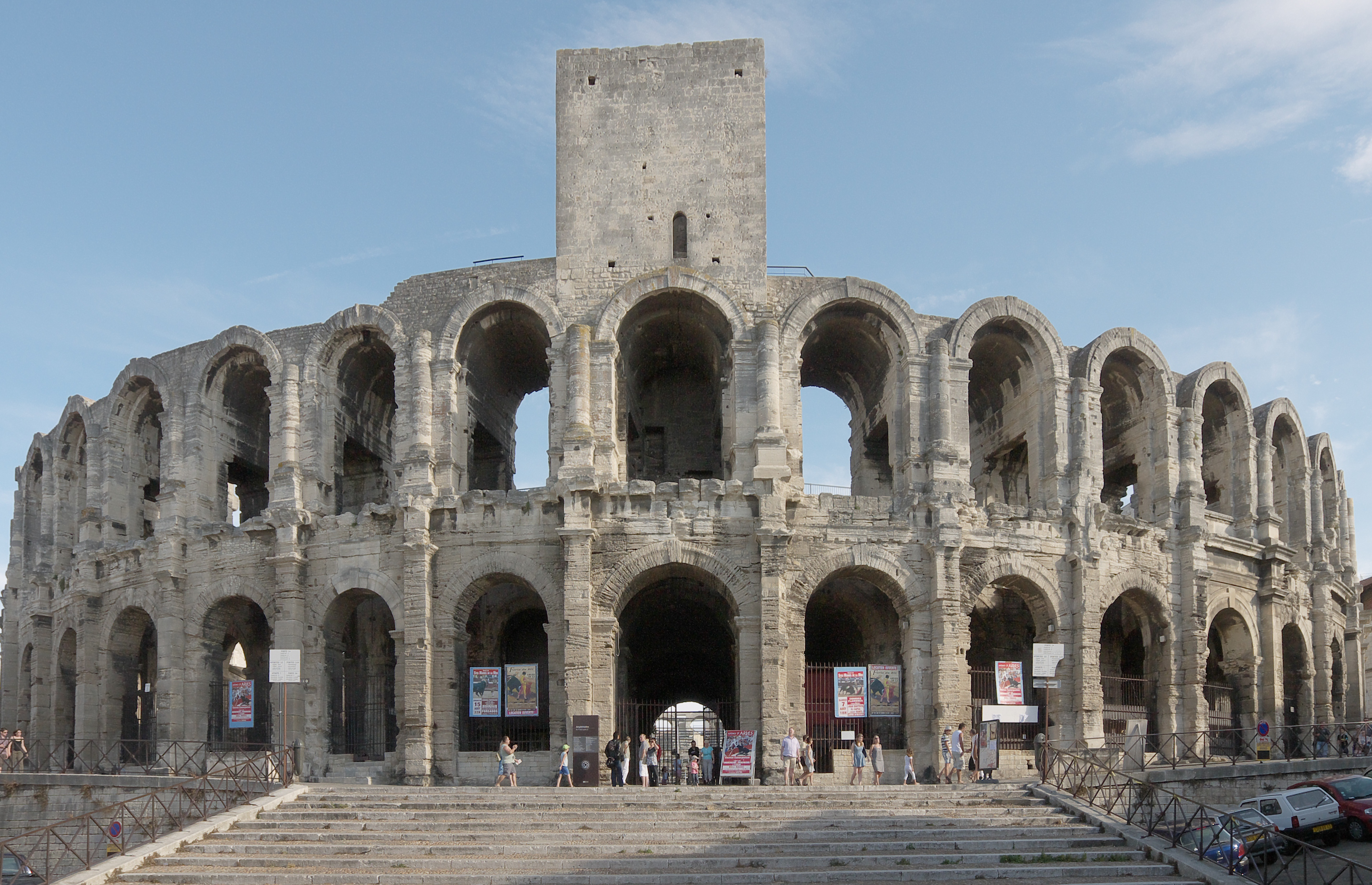
the Amphiteatre in Arles 07-2010

On 476, with the fall of the Roman empire, the city came under the rule of the Visigoths. The Jews of Arles lived relatively fine as long as the Visigoths maintained Arianism, which was later declared as heresy by the Vatican. In 507 and 508, when the city was under siege by the Franks and the Burgundians, the town Jews took part in the fight against them. After falling of Arles into the hands of Clovis I, the first king of Franks, the Jewish community of Arles, among other Arian Visigoths, accused bishop Caesarius of Arles of treason. The bishop's adherents, in response, accused a Jewish soldier of helping the Burgundians and the Franks getting inside the city by pointing a specific part of the wall easy for climbing. The soldier was sentenced to death while the bishop was acquitted. Soon after, upon the rule of the Merovingian kingdom, local bishops all around southern France were encouraged by king Chilperic I himself to attempt conversion over Jews. Arles bishop Virgilius was highly keen to convert local Jews, and apparently did so by force, in objection to the Vatican stand, as shown on an Epistle sent to him by the Vatican:

"... many of the Jews settled in those parts have been brought to the font of baptism more by force than by preaching. Now, I consider the intention in such cases to be worthy of praise... But I fear lest this same intention, unless adequate enforcement from Holy Scripture accompany it, should either have no profitable result... For, when any one is brought to the font of baptism, not by the sweetness of preaching, but by compulsion, he returns to his former superstition, and dies the worse from having been born again. Let, therefore, your Fraternity stir up such men by frequent preaching..."

=== Middle Ages ===
Under the rule of the Carolingian dynasty, starting on 638, life conditions of the Jewish communities in southern France improved. The Carlovingian princes protected the Jews from attacks of the clergy. At the beginning of the ninth century, the kingdom of Burgundy was establishment by Boso of Provence, with the support of the clergy and Pope John VIII. Shortly after, Boso passed his rights over the Jews of Arles to the local Archbishop named Rostang, as a gratitude for the clergy support of him. Boso's successors continued with this tradition. The clergy and the Archbishop of Arles laid heavy taxes upon the local Jews, and it may be claimed to be reason why during the Crusades the Jews of Arles were relatively safe, when other communities in southern France, not subjected directly to the local clergy, suffered severely from the attacks of the crusaders. A document attributed to the disposal of Archbishop Raymond (1142–57) mentions a Jewish cemetery at the montjuif, nowadays Griffeville quarter. A Hebrew inscription on a tombstone dates to this period found in the cemetery can be found today at the Musee d'art chretien. Jews made an annual payment of 44 sols to the Archbishop for this property.

Benjamin of Tudela visited Arles at the 12th century and reported 200 Jewish families and six rabbis living in a separate quarter of town. The Archbishop of Arles appointed each year three Jewish representatives called Rectors, to maintain the connection between the Archbishop and the Jewish community which was under his direct rule, until 1276 when Charles I of Naples deprived the Archbishop of this privilege given to the Arles Archbishops several centuries before. This change caused a deterioration in the life of the Jewish community, since the clergy did not get taxes from them anymore and by that were free to ignite fanaticism among the Christian inhabitants of the town. By that time Jews were already forced to wear the yellow marking on their chests.

=== Fourteenth and fifteenth centuries ===
The second half of the fourteenth century brought severe deterioration on the Jewish community of Arles, due to the reign of Joanna I of Naples, who promoted aggressively a restriction agenda towards Jews. Jews in Arles were not allowed testify as Christians, attend public baths, work on Sundays and other restrictions. Nevertheless, on that time the Jewish community had also established a Torah and Talmud school, a charitable organisation, a synagogue, and a ritual bathe. Documentation imply the occupation of many Jews in medicine, and some business initiatives such as a 1425 partnership of two Jews to manufacture soap. Due to numerous mob attacks on the town Jews, the latter were given permission to build a defense fortress in their quarter for further attacks. The permit was given by king Rene of Anjou, who also gave the Jews permission to practice freely their own customs. With the death of the king Provence was annexed to France (1484) and the attacks renewed shortly after, when a group of people came from outside Arles and killed several women, attacked houses and forcefully converted about fifty Jews into Christianity. In 1488 the Jews were deported out of the city, from which they had never returned. Those who chose conversion were allowed to stay. The synagogue was destroyed, and the final Jew left the city by September 1494.

=== Sixteenth century and on ===
Jews passing Arles during the 17th century were forced to pay a crown impost. After several tryouts of Jews to return to the city, a Provence parliament decree 1775 ordered them to utterly leave. Similar decrees forbidding Jews to trade in Arles were issued in 1773 and 1775. After the French Revolution, some Jews from the Avignon area tried to resettle in Arles. Two centuries after, several Jews were living in the city during the 1960s, though no formal community was active. The Municipal Museum possessed a rich collection of Jewish ritual objects and Jewish documents.

== Prominent Jews active in Arles ==
- Judah ben Moses of Arles - An honorable scholar active in the 11th century, known figure in the European Jewish world of the time.

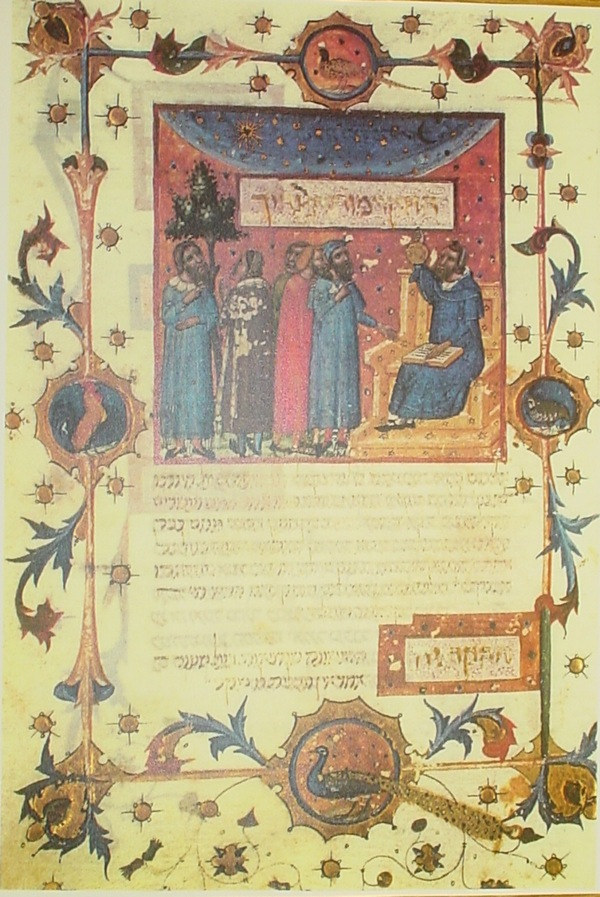
Hebrew translation of Maimonides made by Samuel ibn Tibbon

- Abraham ibn Daud - a Jewish philosopher and religious scholar active in the 12th century.
- Samuel ibn Tibbon - Philosopher and translator in 12th century France. Was the first to translate the famous The Guide for the Perplexed by Maimonides from Arabic into Hebrew.
- Gershon ben Solomon of Arles - a 13th-century philosopher, possibly father of Gersonides.
- Levi Ben Abraham Ben Hayyim - Jewish scholar in the 13th century. Took part in the religious controversy between 1303 and 1306. Formed an encyclopedia and published several scientific articles.
- Kalonymus ben Kalonymus - An Arles born Jewish philosopher and translator. Wrote a few Jewish textbooks and was given the title Nasi.
- Kalonymus ben David ben Todros - A Jewish translator active in the 14th century.
- Nathanael ben Nehemiah Caspi - a Jewish scholar in Provence during the end of the fourteenth century. Composed a commentary on the Cuzari of Judah ha-Levi.
- Bendich Ahin - A mathematician and a physician in Arles during the second half of the 14th century. Appointed physician of queen Joanna I of Naples. Mentioned in Nostradamus writings as a smart disciple.
- Meir Bendig - A talmudist in Arles in the second half of the fifteenth century. Wrote several texts.
- Other notable Jewish residents of Arles.

== See also ==
- History of the Jews in France
- Shuadit
