= Orsha Codex =

17th-century Belarusian manuscript collection

- Ossoliński National Institute, Wrocław, Poland
- Also known as: Аршанскі кодэкс
- Type: Drama, Interlude
- Date: Late 17th century (before 1693)
- Language(s): Polish, Latin, Old Belarusian
- Author: Jesuits of the Orsha Jesuit Collegium

The Orsha Codex (Belarusian: Аршанскі кодэкс) is a monument of Belarusian literature of the late Middle Ages, a manuscript collection from the late 17th century. It was created before 1693 at the Orsha Jesuit Collegium. The plays from the collection were staged in the collegiums of Orsha, Polatsk, Navahrudak, and Viciebsk. It is currently held in the Ossoliński National Institute in Wrocław, Poland.

Besides the "Orsha Codex", the "Kaunas Collection" (1731), created in the Kaunas Jesuit Collegium, was also known, but it was lost in 1944 in Warsaw.

== Background ==
The emergence of school theaters in the Polish–Lithuanian Commonwealth dates back to the 16th century. Unlike the Orthodox and Protestants, the Jesuits sought to promote the development of not only religious but also secular culture, favoring spectacular events. Initially, these were amateur skits performed by students of spiritual schools, then the performances became more complex, and by the mid-17th century, dramas and comedies were already being shown.

In Belarus, interludes (*intermedius*) have been known since the late 16th century; these are insertions into school dramas in Latin, less often in Polish and Church Slavonic.

In the early 21st century, 36 Belarusian interludes from the 16th–18th centuries were identified. Of these, 8 have not been published in full, 6 are kept in the Ossolineum library, and 2 in Lviv.

The first known interlude in the history of Belarusian literature, where a character speaks in a broken Belarusian-Polish language, is considered to be the interlude to the play by the Vilnius Jesuit and collegium teacher Kasper Pętkowski (1554–1612) titled "Timon the Misanthrope" (Цімон Гардзілюд, Tsimon Hardziliud; 1584). The hero of the play is a comic character, a Vilnius tailor. In the first half of the 17th century, in Lithuanian Kražiai, the interlude "Devil Asmalejka" was shown, where a peasant speaks Belarusian, mixing it with broken Polish. In Hrodna (1651), a comedy by the Jesuit Eustachy Piliński "About Jacob and Joseph" (more precisely, a biblical story retold by him) was shown. The comedy was presented with interlude-dialogues "Conversation of Ivan and the Church Servant" and "Schismatic and Uniate-Catholic".

== Contents of the collection ==
The collection consists of 4 Polish Baroque dramas and 7 interlude texts for them. The dramas are: "Spiritual Communion of Saints Boris and Gleb", "Glorious Help for Ramiro's Victory, Performed by Angelic Regiments", "Mystical Communion in the Sorrow of the Innocent Karol and Fryderyk", "Mystical Wedding of the Communion of Genseric and Trizimund".

The most saturated play in the collection ("Komunija duchowna świętych Borysa i Gleba") tells about the murder of his brothers Boris and Gleb by Prince Sviatopolk. Trying to explain the appearance of characters from Kievan Rus' in the Jesuit theater, Adam Maldzis vaguely says that "this is nothing other than the Jesuits' flirtation with the local Orthodox inhabitants". The action of the play is accompanied by interlude scenes: three residents of Polatsk — a craftsman, a tanner, and a peasant ("Ruthenian") — converse on everyday topics and interact with the audience.

In the plays "Glorious Help for Ramiro's Victory" and "Mystical Communion in the Sorrow of the Innocent Karol and Fryderyk", there is an interlude "The Hunter Prepares for the Hunt with Others", where a "Moskal" (Muscovite) appears for the first time in Belarusian drama. His dialogue with the lord's hunter is anecdotal in nature. Adam Maldzis describes the interlude of the fourth scene in detail:

"It features two devils with Polish surnames Krzyczalski and Kozłowski. They want to sow quarrels around the world, but there is nothing to plow the field with. The devils ask a Jewish butcher to lend them an ox, but it turns out that all the oxen have already been eaten. Then the devils harness the Jew himself to the plow. The latter confesses his own and others' sins in Belarusian. In conclusion, the devils drive the Jew, who pulls the plow, and sow discord around the world. Thus, the interlude not only amused but also instructively condemned devils, lords, and Jewish merchants."

According to Belarusian Soviet art historians, the comedic scenes for Polish dramas showed the peasant ("Ruthenian") mostly as a dark and limited person.

Polish literary scholar Julian Lewański, in the preface to the Polish edition of 17th-century plays, designated the language of the interludes as a "Ukrainian-Belarusian-Polish mixture". However, A. Maldzis believes that the Belarusian language dominates in them, mixed with Russianisms and Ukrainisms. In the interlude "Spiritual Communion of Saints Boris and Gleb", the comic effect is achieved by juxtaposing "high" and "low". For example, Belarusian and borrowed words are played upon: "akt" (act) and "tak" (so/yes), "scena" (scene) and "sciana" (wall), "proscenium" and "proscienka" (simply), "synopsis" and "svinapas" (swineherd).

According to the observation of some researchers, no matter how the Jesuits treated the Belarusian population, by introducing a peasant, a "Ruthenian", or an old man into the play, they recognized Belarusians as a distinct nation.

== Bibliography ==
- Мальдзіс, А. (1983). "Арганізаціыя пастановак і рэпертуар школьных театраў". Гісторыя беларускага театра у 3 тт. Т. 1 [History of the Belarusian Theater in 3 Vol. Vol. 1] (in Belarusian). Minsk: Навука і тэхніка.
- Міско, С. М. (2000). Школьны тэатр Беларусі ХVІ―ХVІІІ стст.: вучэбны дапаможнік [School Theater of Belarus of the 16th–18th Centuries: Educational Manual] (in Belarusian). Minsk: Тэсей.
- В. Сабалеўскі, ed. (1997). Хрэстаматыя па гісторыі беларускага тэатра і драматургіі: у 3 т. Т. 1: Ад вытокаў — да пачатку ХХ стагоддзя [Anthology of the History of Belarusian Theater and Dramaturgy: In 3 Vol. Vol. 1: From the Origins to the Early 20th Century] (in Belarusian). Minsk: Бел. ун-т культуры.
- Simon, Constantin (1999). Jésuites et Biélorusses: à la lisière de la civilisation ou au carrefour des cultures (in French). Meudon: «Plamia» revue du Centre d’Études Russes St Georges.
- L. Grzebień, ed. (1996) [2004]. Encyklopedia wiedzy o jezuitach na ziemiach Polski i Litwy 1564—1995 (in Polish) (2nd ed.). Kraków: Wydział Filozoficzny Towarzystwa Jezusowego — Instytut Kultury Religijnej — Wydawnictwo WAM.
