= Hakkarainen =

Hakkarainen is a Finnish surname. Notable people with the surname include:

- Harri Hakkarainen (born 1969), Finnish javelin thrower
- Kauko Hakkarainen (born 1932), Finnish footballer
- Mikael Hakkarainen (born 1998), Finnish ice hockey player
- Mikko Hakkarainen (born 1976), Finnish ice hockey player
- Pentti Hakkarainen (psychologist) (1944–2021), Lithuanian educational psychologist
- Pentti Kalevi Hakkarainen (born 1958), Finnish banker
- Riikka Hakkarainen (born 1977), Finnish golfer
- Teuvo Hakkarainen (born 1960), Finnish politician
- Väinö Hakkarainen (1932–2009), Finnish wrestler
