= Bendit =

- Gender: Male
- Language: Yiddish

Origin
- Meaning: Blessed

Other names
- Alternative spelling: Bendet
- Related names: Benesh, Baruch, Benedict

Bendit or Bendet (Yiddish: בענדיט) is a Yiddish-language masculine given name. It is considered a vernacular version of the Hebrew name Baruch (meaning 'blessed'), derived from the Latin name with the same meaning, Benedictus.

== People ==
=== As a given name ===
- Baruch Bendit Dusnus (1811–1886), Dutch rabbi
- Baruch Bendit Goitein (1770–1839), rabbi
- Maestro Bendit (fl. 14th century), physician

=== As a surname ===
- Daniel Cohn-Bendit (born 1945), French-German politician
- Gabriel Cohn-Bendit (1936–2021), French activist
- Stacey Bendet (born 1978), American fashion designer
