= Armand Lunel =

French writer

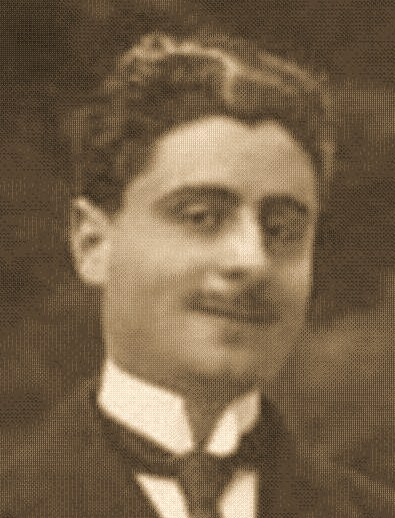
- Lunel, 25 March 1920, at his wedding
- Born: 9 June 1892; Aix-en-Provence, Bouches-du-Rhône, France
- Died: 3 November 1977 (aged 85); Monaco
- Occupation: Writer
- Writing career
- Language: French and Judeo-Provençal
- Notable work: Nicolo-Peccavi
- Notable awards: Prix Renaudot (1926)

Armand Lunel (French pronunciation: [aʁmɑ̃ lynɛl]; 9 June 1892 – 3 November 1977) was a French writer of Provençal Jewish background, often referred to as the last known speaker of Judeo-Provençal.

== Biography ==
Lunel was born in Aix-en-Provence, France, to a family that belonged to a Jewish subculture that had roots in the area for at least five centuries. After growing up in the region, Lunel taught law and philosophy in Monaco.

Lunel wrote extensively about the Jews of Provence. Though often referred to as the last known speaker of Judeo-Provençal, he did not actually speak it; at most, he learned a few words and sentences from his great-grandparents.

He was a childhood friend of the composer Darius Milhaud, and wrote the librettos of Milhaud's operas Esther de Carpentras ("Esther of Carpentras," 1938, based on Judeo-Provençal folklore), Les malheurs d'Orphée ("The Misfortunes of Orpheus," 1924), and David (1954). He also provided the libretto for Henri Sauguet's La chartreuse de Parme, premiered in 1939.

He married Rachel Suzanne Messiah (1892–1981), a daughter of architect Aaron Messiah, in 1920.

Most of the current knowledge about Lunel was collected by his son-in-law Georges Jessula.

== Bibliography ==
- L'Imagerie du cordier, La Nouvelle Revue Française, Paris, 1924.
- Nicolo-Peccavi ou L'affaire Dreyfus à Carpentras, Gallimard, Paris, 1926.
- Le Balai de sorcière, Gallimard, Paris, 1935.
- Jérusalem à Carpentras, Gallimard, 1937.
- Les Amandes d'Aix, Gallimard, Paris, 1949.
- La Belle à la fontaine, A. Fayard, Paris, 1959.
- J'ai vu vivre la Provence, A. Fayard, Paris, 1962.
- Juifs du Languedoc, de la Provence et des États français du Pape, Albin Michel, Paris, 1975. Translated by Samuel N. Rosenberg as "The Jews of the South of France" (with a foreword by David A. Jessula), Cincinnati: Hebrew University College Annual 89 (2018), pp. 1–158.
- Les Chemins de mon judaïsme et divers inédits, presented by Georges Jessula, L'Harmattan, Paris, 1993.
