= Jesuit College in Navahrudak =

Historical Jesuit educational institution in Navahrudak

Navahrudak Jesuit Collegium
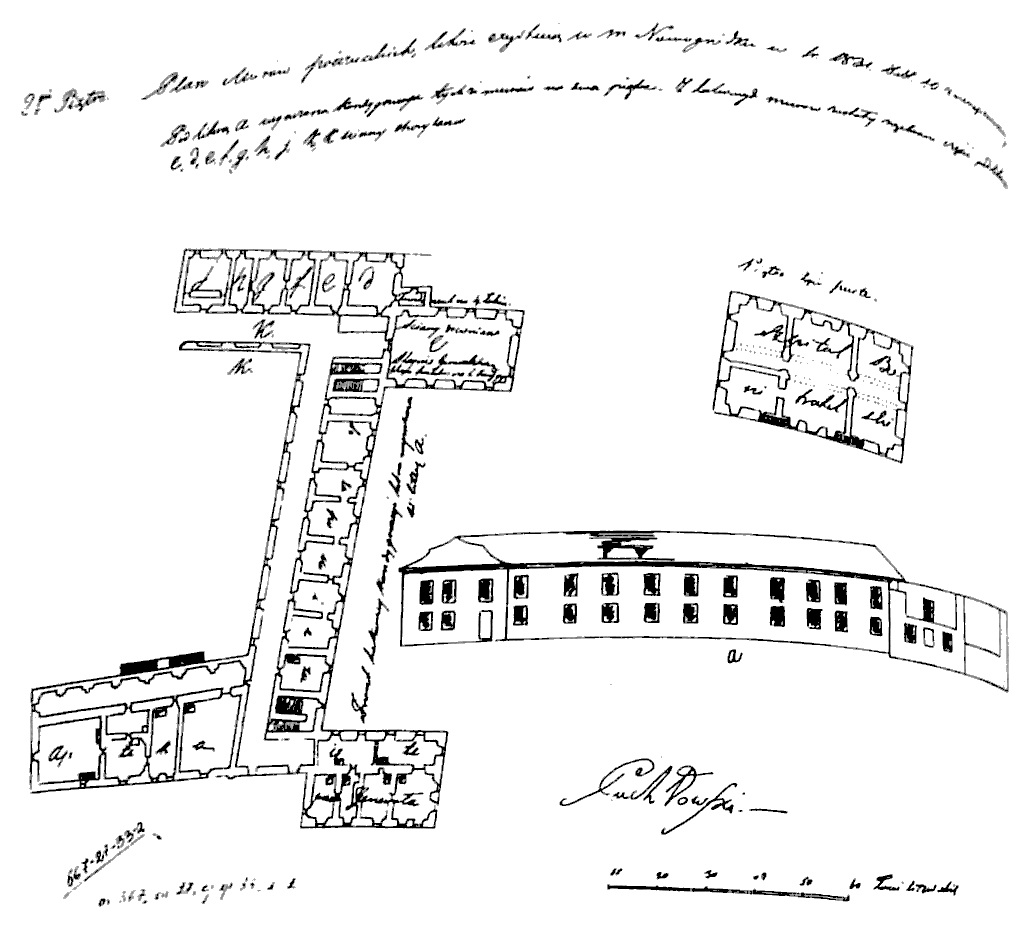
- Survey drawings of the former Jesuit collegium, 1830
- Navahrudak, Grand Duchy of Lithuania; Polish–Lithuanian Commonwealth

Information
- Type: Jesuit collegium
- Religious affiliation: Roman Catholic (Jesuits)
- Established: 1626 (mission); 1631 (residence); 1714 (collegium)
- Closed: 1773 (order suppressed)

The Jesuit College in Navahrudak (Belarusian: Навагрудскі езуіцкі калегіум) was an educational institution of the Society of Jesus that operated from the 17th to the 18th century in Navahrudak, Grand Duchy of Lithuania (now in Grodno Region, Belarus). It functioned as a mission (1626–1631), a residence (1631–1714), and a full collegium (1714–1773). Administratively, it belonged to the Lithuanian Province of the Society of Jesus.

== History ==
=== Mission and Residence (1626–1714) ===
The first Jesuits arrived in Navahrudak in the 16th century at the invitation of the parish priest Marcin Gradowski to conduct disputes, which set a precedent for the order's permanent settlement in the city. In 1626, Jan Moszyński funded a house and a church, allowing the mission to be upgraded to the rank of a residence in 1631. Other early benefactors included M. Hołownia and the first superior of the mission, Jakub Różnowolski.

In 1649, a grammar school was opened. However, the development of the institution was halted by the Cossack and Russian invasion in 1655, during which the superior Grzegorz Rafałowicz was killed, and the wooden house, church, and school were burned down. In 1662, the Uniate Metropolitan Gabriel Kolenda donated an abandoned wooden church from the village of Ruta, which was moved to Navahrudak.

Crucial support for the residence came from the Voivode of Trakai and Navahrudak, Bogusław Aleksander Uniechowski, and his wife Barbara (née Dunin). They initiated the construction of a brick church in 1687, which was completed in 1702. In 1705, Barbara, along with her second husband Michał Potocki, donated the Burdykoŭščyna estate with the town of Pačapava, intended to provide the financial basis for a future collegium.

However, the elevation of the residence to a collegium was delayed due to the difficult financial situation during the Great Northern War. The passage of Swedish and Russian troops in 1706–1709 caused significant losses. The plague epidemic of 1710–1711 led to increased mortality across the Lithuanian province; while no Jesuits in Navahrudak died, the death of their subjects negatively impacted the institution's finances.

During the war, construction work continued. In 1709, Superior Kazimierz de La Valle began building a brick residence, a project that lasted until 1717. In 1709, the church towers collapsed and were rebuilt in 1712.

=== Collegium (1714–1773) ===
Permission to transform the residence into a collegium was finally granted by General Michelangelo Tamburini in 1714. This decision was influenced by another donation from the Navahrudak horodniczy Jan Bakanowski in 1712 for a two-year philosophy course.

In 1716, the Bishop of Vilnius, Konstanty Kazimierz Brzostowski, consecrated the new church dedicated to the Immaculate Conception of the Blessed Virgin Mary and St. Stanislaus Kostka. A fire in 1751 destroyed the altars, bells, organ, towers, clock, and library. According to a surviving inventory, eleven altars were constructed inside the church between 1753 and 1756. An image of the Virgin Mary, which survived the fire, was held in special reverence but was lost after the suppression of the order.

The collegium building was constructed in several stages. Work was interrupted by the death of Barbara Uniechowska in 1719 and resumed only in 1725, continuing until 1745 when the last wing was completed. In 1731, a wooden school building with four classrooms was erected. Between 1758 and 1762, a two-story outbuilding (oficyna) was constructed for living quarters and granaries. In 1763, a single-story outbuilding was added, housing stables, an ox-driven mill, a carriage house, and servants' quarters.

=== Post-Suppression Period ===
After the Suppression of the Society of Jesus in 1773, the schools were taken over by the Commission of National Education (KEN). Since Navahrudak was a voivodeship capital, the KEN ensured a high standard of education, employing former Jesuits as teachers. The last rector, Franciszek Suchodolski, remained as the superior until 1781. In 1797, the school was taken over by the Dominican Order.

The church fell into disuse as there were already several other churches in the town. Due to a lack of funds for maintenance, it fell into ruin and was eventually dismantled by the municipal authorities. In 1817, there was an initiative to convert the collegium building into a secular gymnasium, but this did not materialize. Part of the building was dismantled in 1831. The remaining structures were damaged in 1941 and demolished after World War II.

== Gallery ==
Historical images and graphics

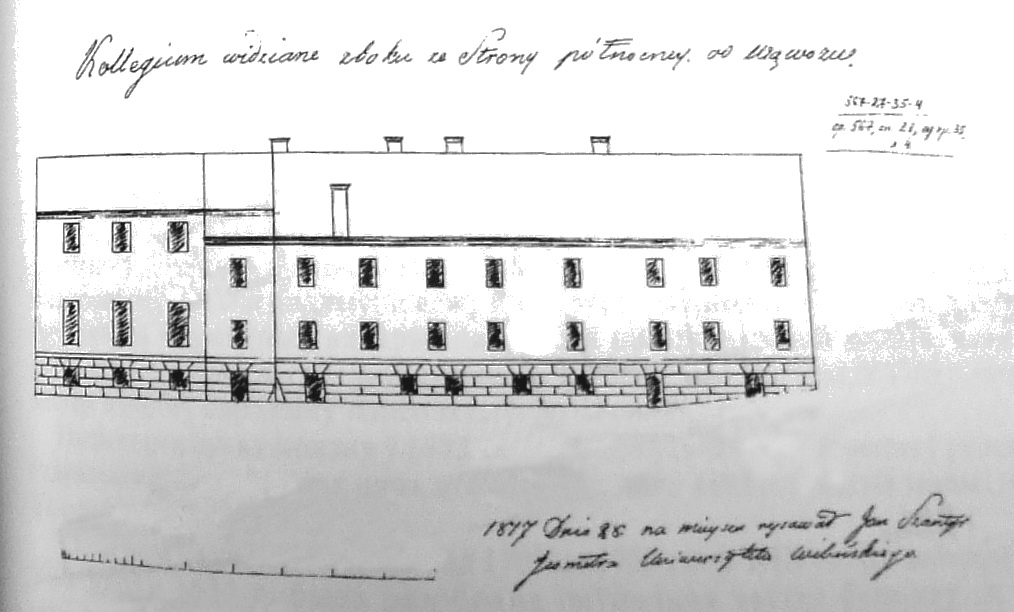
Survey drawings of the collegium buildings, 1817

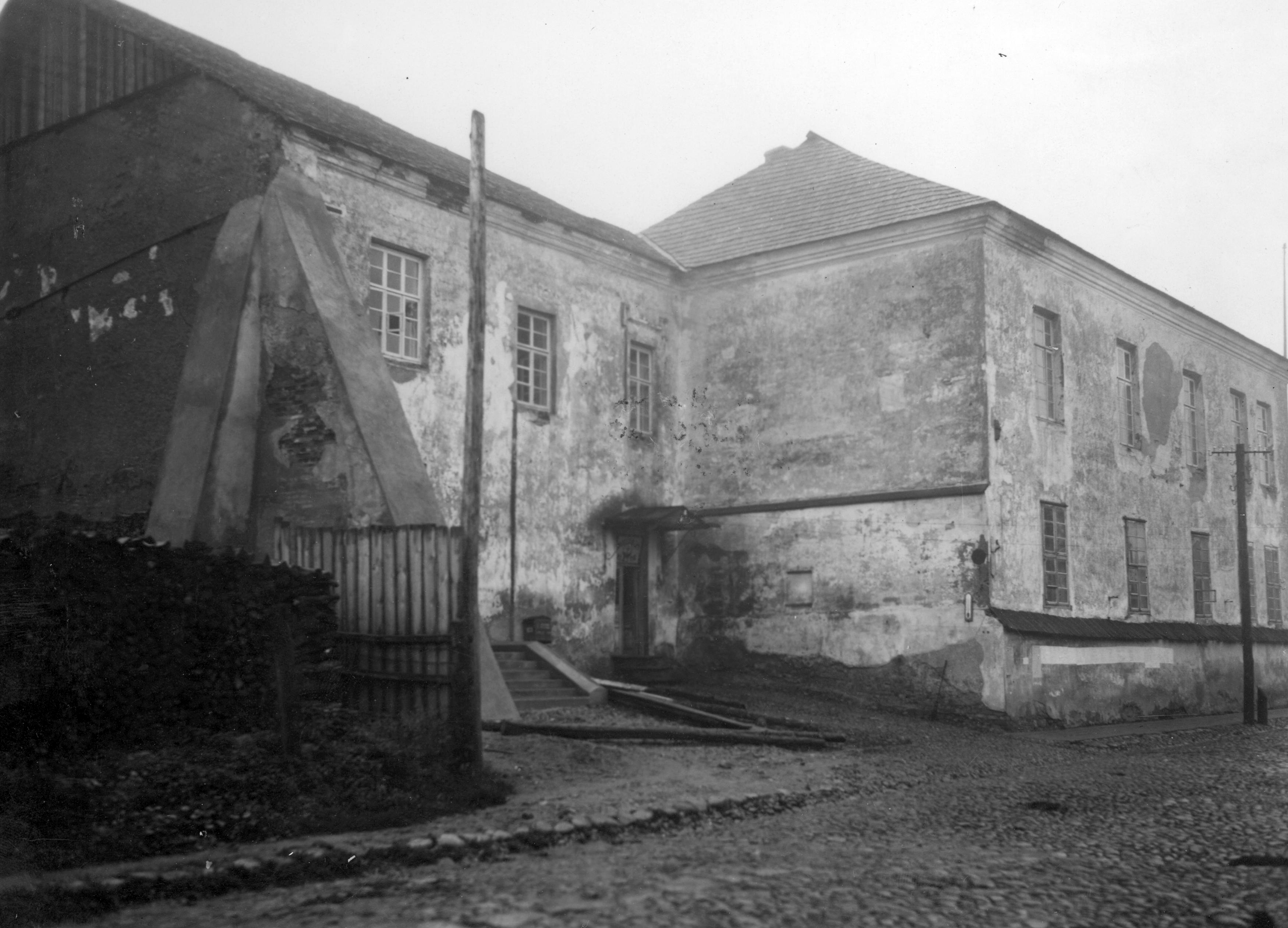
Former Jesuit Collegium housing the Adam Mickiewicz Gymnasium, 1925–1929

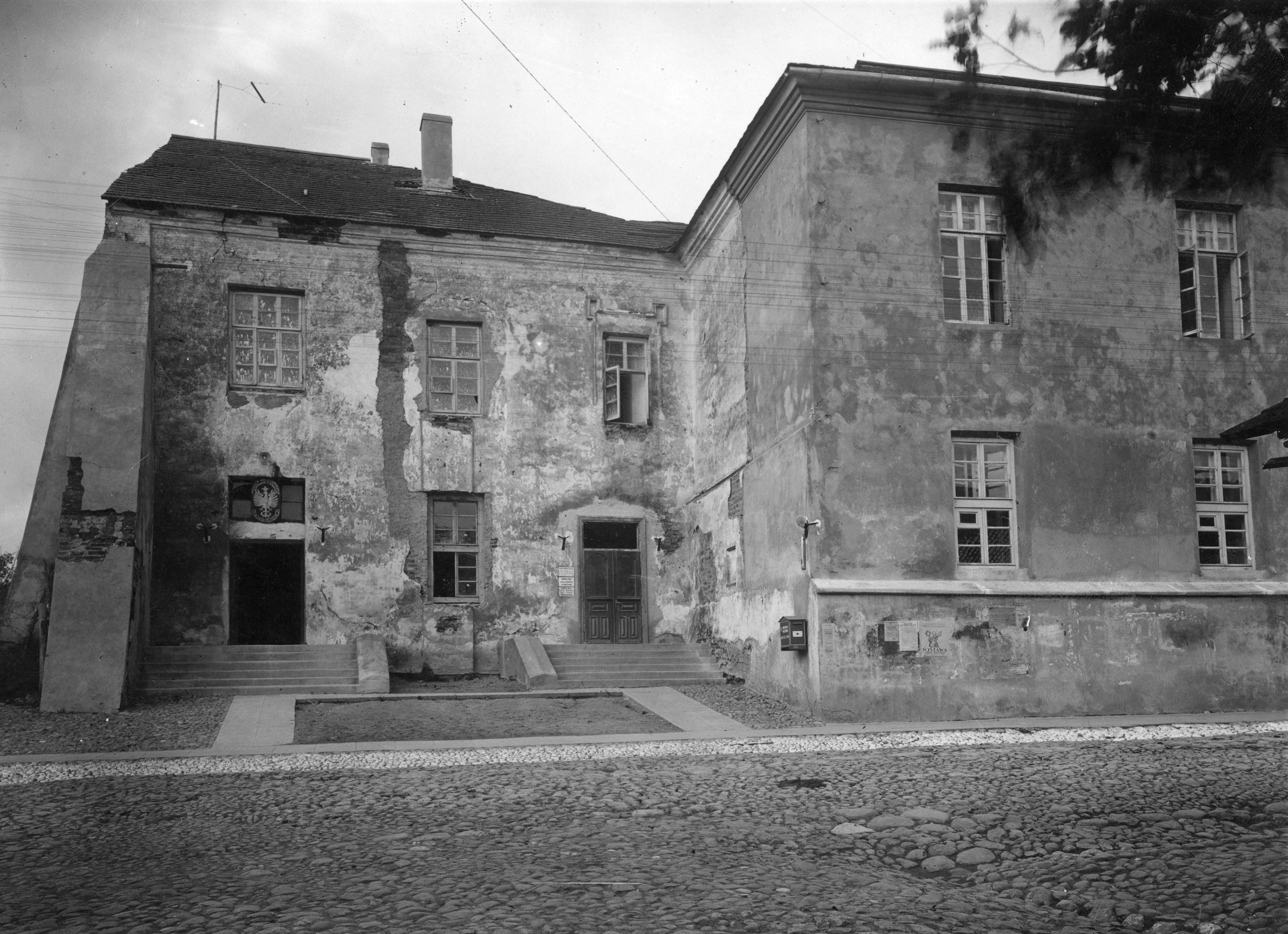
The collegium building in 1925–1929

== Educational activities ==
A humanities and rhetoric course was opened only in 1649, delayed due to competition from the Basilian monks who already had a school in Navahrudak. In 1653, classes in poetics and rhetoric were added. In 1679, rhetoric was formally introduced into the curriculum. In 1712, Jan Bakanowski funded a two-year philosophy course for laypeople, and a mathematics course was introduced in 1733. The post-suppression inventory lists 34 mathematical and physical instruments used in the collegium. Occasional courses in foreign languages were offered: German (1749–1751) and French (1750/1751). A philosophy course for scholastics was conducted from 1728 to 1773, and moral theology was taught in 1750–1752 and 1754/1755. The Society's schools also staged theatrical plays during sessions of the Lithuanian Tribunal.

== Mission activities ==
The Navahrudak Jesuits conducted permanent missions outside the town:

- Slonim: Funded in 1709; obtained the rank of a residence in 1725.
- Lyubcha: Funded in 1719 by Stanisław Kuczycki due to the lack of a Catholic parish. The Jesuits built two granaries there for shipping grain to Prussia.
- Haradzishcha: Opened in 1739; missionaries served the local St. Anne's Church.
- Varoncha: Established in 1749 by Kazimierz Ignacy and Teofila Niesiołowski. The missionaries served the St. Anne's Church there until the suppression.
- Other missions included Vostraŭ, Bakanaŭ, and Pačapava.

== Estates and assets ==
At the time of the order's suppression, the Navahrudak Jesuits owned six estate complexes: Vostraŭ-Bakanaŭ (acquired 1712), Pačapava-Burdykoŭščyna (1705), Moladava (1659), Zabierdava (1663), Pucevičy (1722), and Brycianka (divided into Vialikaya and Malaya Brycianka, acquired in 1700). They also held temporary possessions in other locations. In total, the Jesuits owned 9 folwarks, 2 towns, and 31 villages, comprising 476 hearths (dymy) and 4,686 hectares of arable land. The annual income from these estates was 39,254 złoty.

The Jesuits also owned 15 urban properties in Navahrudak and one in Lyubcha, which led to economic disputes with the town magistracy, resulting in a 1739 court ruling forcing the return of 9 properties to the town.

== Related institutions ==
- Boarding School (Konwikt): Established in 1655. It ceased operations in the 1730s.
- Music Bursa: Existed from at least the 1680s. In 1773, the ensemble consisted of seven paid musicians and students, possessing 24 instruments and 117 musical scores.
- Pharmacy: Established in 1721. It possessed a collection of 28 books, mostly medical.
- Library: Destroyed by fire in 1751, but rebuilt to contain 1,006 volumes by 1773. The collection was later dispersed.

== List of Superiors and Rectors ==
=== Superiors of the Residence (1624–1714) ===
- Michał Rafałowicz (1624–1630)
- Władysław Stępkowski (1630–1632)
- Jakub Różnowolski (1632–1641)
- Jakub Ugoski (1641–1644)
- Jan Szylpa (1644–1645)
- Mikołaj Ciołek (1645–1646)
- Szymon Sokolnicki (1646–1647)
- Paweł Idzikowski (1647–1653)
- Jan Chludziński (1653–1655)
- Grzegorz Rafałowicz (1655)
- Władysław Rudziński (1655–1662)
- Adam Wardacki (1663–1672)
- Jerzy Łoknicki (1673–1676)
- Mikołaj Zernicki (1676–1679)
- Stanisław Jupicki (1679–1682)
- Jędrzej Rybski (1682–1684)
- Marcin Kołakowski (1684–1690)
- Jacek Siemionowicz (1690–1693)
- Jędrzej Hladowicki (1693–1697)
- Jan Marcelli (1697–1700)
- Kazimierz de la Valle (1700–1714)

=== Rectors of the Collegium (1714–1773) ===
- Kazimierz de la Valle (1714–1715)
- Jacek Krebski (1715–1718)
- Adam Rostkowski (1718–1726)
- Antoni Misztold (1726–1731)
- Franciszek Karniewski (1731–1734)
- Antoni Bykowski (1734–1735)
- Franciszek Skłodowski (1735–1738)
- Jan Illinicz (1738–1741)
- Antoni Bykowski (1741–1748)
- Franciszek Grzymała (1748–1752)
- Franciszek Rościszewski (1752–1760)
- Antoni Adam Skorulski (1760–1764)
- Stefan Wierzbicki (1764–1768)
- Ignacy Chodźko (1768–1771)
- Franciszek Suchodolski (1772–1773)

== Notable people ==
=== Alumni ===
- Stanisław Niezabitowski (1641–1717) – diarist and reformation activist.
- Thomas Żebrowski (1714–1758) – mathematician and architect.
- Benedykt Dobszewicz (1722–1799) – philosopher and theologian.

=== Faculty ===
- Antoni Adam Skorulski (1715–1777) – philosopher and educator (Rector 1760–1764).
- Karol Wyrwicz (1717–1793) – historian and geographer.
- Dominik Rudnicki (1676–1739) – writer.
- Adam Krupski (1706–1748) – philosopher and legal expert.

== Bibliography ==
- Пазднякоў, В. (2005). "Новагародскi езуіцкi калегiум". Вялікае княства Літоўскае: Энцыклапедыя [Grand Duchy of Lithuania: Encyclopedia] (in Belarusian). Vol. 2. Мінск: Беларуская Энцыклапедыя. p. 361. ISBN 985-11-0378-0.
- Рэлігія і царква на Беларусі: Энцыкл. даведнік [Religion and Church in Belarus: Encyclopedic Reference] (in Belarusian). Мінск: БелЭн. 2001. p. 368. ISBN 985-11-0179-6.
- Załęski, S. (1905). Jezuici w Polsce. T. 4, Cz. 3: Kolegia i domy założone w drugiej dobie rządów Zygmunta III i za rządów Władysława IV 1608–1648 [Jesuits in Poland. Vol. 4, Part 3] (in Polish). Kraków. pp. 1292–1303.
- Mariani, A., ed. (2020). Inwentarze kolegium jezuitów w Nowogródku oraz jego majątków ziemskich z przełomu roku 1773 i 1774 [Inventories of the Jesuit Collegium in Novogrudok...] (in Polish). Poznań.
- Mariani, A. (2016). "Jezuici prowincji litewskiej wobec epidemii dżumy z lat 1708-1711" [Jesuits of the Lithuanian Province in the Face of the Plague Epidemic of 1708–1711]. Zapiski Historyczne (in Polish). LXXXI (2): 72–74.
- Paszenda, J. (2001). "Kościół i kolegium jezuitów w Nowogródku" [Church and Jesuit Collegium in Novogrudok]. Przegląd Wschodni (in Polish). 7 (4): 1151–1168.
