= Bento (name) =

Bento, a diminutive of Benedito, is a Portuguese name meaning Benedict based on Late Latin Benedictus, "blessed", "well spoken of". It can be used as a given name or a surname.

It may refer to:

== Given name ==
- Bento Teixeira (circa 1561 – circa 1618), Portuguese-Brazilian poet
- Bento de Góis (1562–1607), Portuguese Jesuit missionary and explorer
- Baruch Spinoza (1632–1677), aka Bento or Benedito de Espinosa, a Dutch philosopher
- Bento Gonçalves da Silva (1788–1847), Brazilian revolutionary, leader of the Ragamuffin War
- Bento António Gonçalves (1902–1942), member of the Portuguese Communist Party
- Bento Carneiro, character portrayed by the actor Chico Anysio during 2009–2010
- António Bento Bembe, Cabinda/Angolan politician active 2004–2009
- Bento (footballer) (Bento Matheus Krepski, born 1999), Brazilian football goalkeeper

== Surname ==
- Manuel Bento (1948–2007), Portuguese footballer
- Paulo Bento (born 1969), Portuguese footballer
- Rui Bento (born 1972), Portuguese footballer
- Sidney Bento (born 1974), Brazilian footballer

== See also ==
- Bento (disambiguation)
- São Bento
