= Benedita =

Benedita may refer to:

== Places ==
- Benedita, Portugal, A freguesia (civil parish) of Alcobaça Municipality, Portugal

== People ==
- Benedita Barata da Rocha (born 1949), immunologist
- Benedita da Silva (born 1943), Brazilian politician
- Benedita Pereira (born 1985), Portuguese actress
- Infanta Benedita of Portugal (1746–1829), Portuguese infanta, daughter of King Joseph I of Portugal and his wife Marianne Victoria of Borbón
- Maria Benedita Bormann (1853–1895), Brazilian writer of feminist novels and other works using the pseudonym Délia
- Maria Benedita Mouzinho de Albuquerque de Faria Pinho (1865–1939), Portuguese writer, translator, teacher, propagandist, republican activist and feminist activist
