= Bento (disambiguation) =

Bento is a single-portion takeout or home-packed meal common in several cuisines.

Bento may also refer to:

== People ==
- Bento (name), a Portuguese given name or surname
- Bento (footballer) (born 1999), a Brazilian footballer

== Arts, entertainment, and media ==
- Bento, a science fiction fanzine edited by David D. Levine and his wife Kate Yule
- Bento Books, an American independent book publisher
- Bento, the name of the second Keyboard Cat

== Computing and technology ==
- Bento (database), a discontinued database application for Mac OS X made by FileMaker Inc.
- Bento, the former name of an OpenDoc compound document file format
- Bento Note, a laptop-tablet hybrid, aka convertible laptop, in a modular design

== See also ==
- Ben-To, a Japanese light novel, manga and anime series created by Asaura
- Benthos, the community of organisms which live on, in, or near the seabed
