= Journal of Russian & East European Psychology =

- Discipline: psychology
- Language: English
- Edited by: Pentti Ensio Hakkarainen

Publication details
- Former name(s): Soviet Psychology and Psychiatry; Soviet Psychology
- History: 1962–present
- Publisher: Routledge
- Frequency: Bimonthly

Standard abbreviations
- ISO 4: J. Russ. East Eur. Psychol.

Indexing
- ISSN: 1061-0405
- LCCN: 92640624
- OCLC no.: 25167865

Links
- Journal homepage

Journal of Russian & East European Psychology is a bimonthly peer-reviewed academic journal published by Routledge. The journal publishes materials written by authors from the post-Soviet states and Eastern Europe. It was established in 1962 under the title Soviet Psychology and Psychiatry (ISSN 0584-5610) but changed its name to Soviet Psychology (ISSN 0038-5751) in 1966, obtaining its present name in 1992. The editor-in-chief is Pentti Hakkarainen (Vytautas Magnus University). The journal is abstracted and indexed in PsycINFO and EBSCO databases.
