= Benedictus =

Benedictus, Latin for "blessed" or "a blessed person", may refer to:

== Music ==
- "Benedictus" (canticle), also called the "Canticle of Zachary", a canticle in the Gospel of Luke
- Part of the "Sanctus", a hymn and part of the eucharistic prayer in Western Christianity
  - Various musical interpretations of it
- "Benedictus" a song by Simon & Garfunkel from their 1964 album Wednesday Morning, 3 A.M.
- "Benedictus" (Strawbs song), a song by Strawbs on their 1972 album Grave New World

== People ==
- Benedictus (given name)
- David Benedictus (born 1938), English novelist and theatre director
- Kyle Benedictus (born 1991), Scottish footballer
- Édouard Bénédictus (1879–1930), French chemist who invented laminated glass

== See also ==
- Benedictus Deus (disambiguation), one of several papal bulls issued by a Pope
- Benedict (disambiguation)
- Benedicta
- Benedicto
