= Benedicta =

- Gender: Female

Origin
- Origin: Latin
- Meaning: Blessed

Other names
- Related names: Benedict, Benedicto, Benedictus

Benedicta may refer to:

== People ==
- Benedicta Henrietta of the Palatinate (1652–1730), a German princess
- Benedicta Ajudua (born 1980), Nigerian sprinter
- Caterina Benedicta Grazianini (1685–1715), composer
- Teresa Benedicta of the Cross, religious name of Edith Stein (1891-1942)
- Benedicta Boccoli, an Italian actress
- Benedicta de Oliveira (1927–2020), Brazilian sprinter
- Benedicta van Minnen, South African MP

== Other ==
- Benedicta Arts Center, a performing arts center
- Benedicta, Maine, US
- Benedicta (plant), a taxonomic synonym for the genus Centaurea

== See also ==
- Benedict (disambiguation)
- Benedicto
- Benedictum
- Benedictus (disambiguation)
