= Judeo-Provençal =

Extinct Occitan dialect

- Judæo-Occitan, "Shuadit"
- Native to: France
- Region: Provence
- Ethnicity: Papal Jews
- Extinct: 3 November 1977, with the death of Armand Lunel
- Language family: Indo-European: Italic; Latino-Faliscan; Latin; Romance; Italo-Western; Western; Gallo-Romance; Occitano-Romance; Occitan; Judeo-Provençal
- Writing system: Latin; Hebrew

Language codes
- ISO 639-3: sdt
- Glottolog: (insufficiently attested or not a distinct language) shua1252
- IETF: sdt

Judeo-Provençal, or Judeo-Occitan, is a dialect of Occitan historically spoken by Jews in the South of France. In the Middle Ages, it was spoken by the Jews of Occitania and, following waves of expulsions from the Kingdom of France between 1306 and 1501, by Papal Jews in the Comtat Venaissin during the modern period.

It is known from documents dating from the 11th century up until the 19th century. Most of its speakers eventually assimilated to French and the language has been extinct since the 20th century.

== Name ==
The language has been referred to by many names, including Judeo-Provençal, Judeo-Occitan, Judéo-Comtadin, Hébraïco-Comtadin, Hébraïco-Provençal, and Shuadit.

Scholars use these names differently. Cyril Aslanov retains the traditional Judeo-Provençal, while cautioning that the term wrongly suggests a single distinct language: each Jewish community of Occitania spoke the local variety of Occitan that it shared with its Christian surroundings. Adam Strich prefer Judeo-Occitan, on the grounds that linguists now generally reserve "Provençal" for a single dialect of Occitan rather than for the language as a whole. George Jochnowitz uses Judeo-Provençal for the medieval language, preserved in texts in Hebrew script, and Shuadit for the modern language, recorded in Latin characters.

The name Shuadit (or Chuadit) goes back to Zosa Szajkowski, who claimed in 1948 that the Jews of the Comtat Venaissin had called their language שוַאדיט (shvadyt), a word he derived from Hebrew yəhudit ('Jewish'). The claim was accepted by Max Weinreich and most subsequent scholars, but its validity is now disputed. For Strich, the word is attested only once, in a poem written by a non-Jewish author after the annexation of the Comtat to France, and its form does not match the way Comtadine Jews are known to have pronounced Hebrew yəhudit. Aslanov likewise considers it far from certain that the Jews of the Comtat ever used the word for their language. Jochnowitz, however, accepts the derivation: in his view, a sound change of Hebrew /y/ to [š], seen in words such as chadayim 'hands' (from Hebrew yadayim), would have regularly turned Yehudit into Shuadit.

The parodic play Harcanot et Barcanot (c. 1820) instead calls the Jewish way of speaking Provençal lassan hakodes (ləšon ha-qodeš 'Hebrew'), which according to Aslanov designated not the vernacular itself but a kind of secret language: Provençal in which much of the vocabulary was replaced by Hebrew words, often distorted, and which was used only in specific circumstances by a small number of initiated speakers. Armand Lunel called this register argot hébraïco-provençal ('Hebrew-Provençal slang'), a label also found in Pierre Pansier's work on the Occitan of Avignon.

== Sources ==
The surviving documentation falls into two groups: medieval texts, written before the final expulsion of the Jews from France in 1395 and reflecting Old Occitan, and modern texts from the period of confinement in the Comtat Venaissin.

=== Middle Ages ===
The earliest evidence consists of Occitan words inserted as glosses in medieval works written in Hebrew. The oldest of these is the Ittur of Isaac ben Abba Mari of Marseilles, written between 1170 and 1193. Others appear in David Kimhi's Sefer ha-Shorashim ('Book of Roots') from the 13th century.

Two longer texts survive. A 14th-century prayer book for women contains an Occitan translation of the liturgy and is the longest extant Jewish text in Old Occitan. It is known for a blessing in which the speaker thanks God 'who made me a woman', where the traditional Hebrew text reads 'who made me according to his will'. Its word order, however, follows the Hebrew original closely. The longest original composition is the Roman d'Esther of Crescas del Caylar, a physician of Avignon, written in the 1320s: a verse romance on the Book of Esther of which fewer than 450 lines survive from a once much longer work.

In this period, what distinguishes the texts is essentially the script: the language itself did not differ from that of the surrounding Christian population, but it was written in Hebrew letters. Apart from the word goya ('gentile woman') in the 14th-century prayer book, the medieval texts contain almost no words of Hebrew origin, and for the earliest of them it can even be difficult to decide whether they are Judeo-Provençal or simply Provençal written in Hebrew characters.

=== Modern period ===
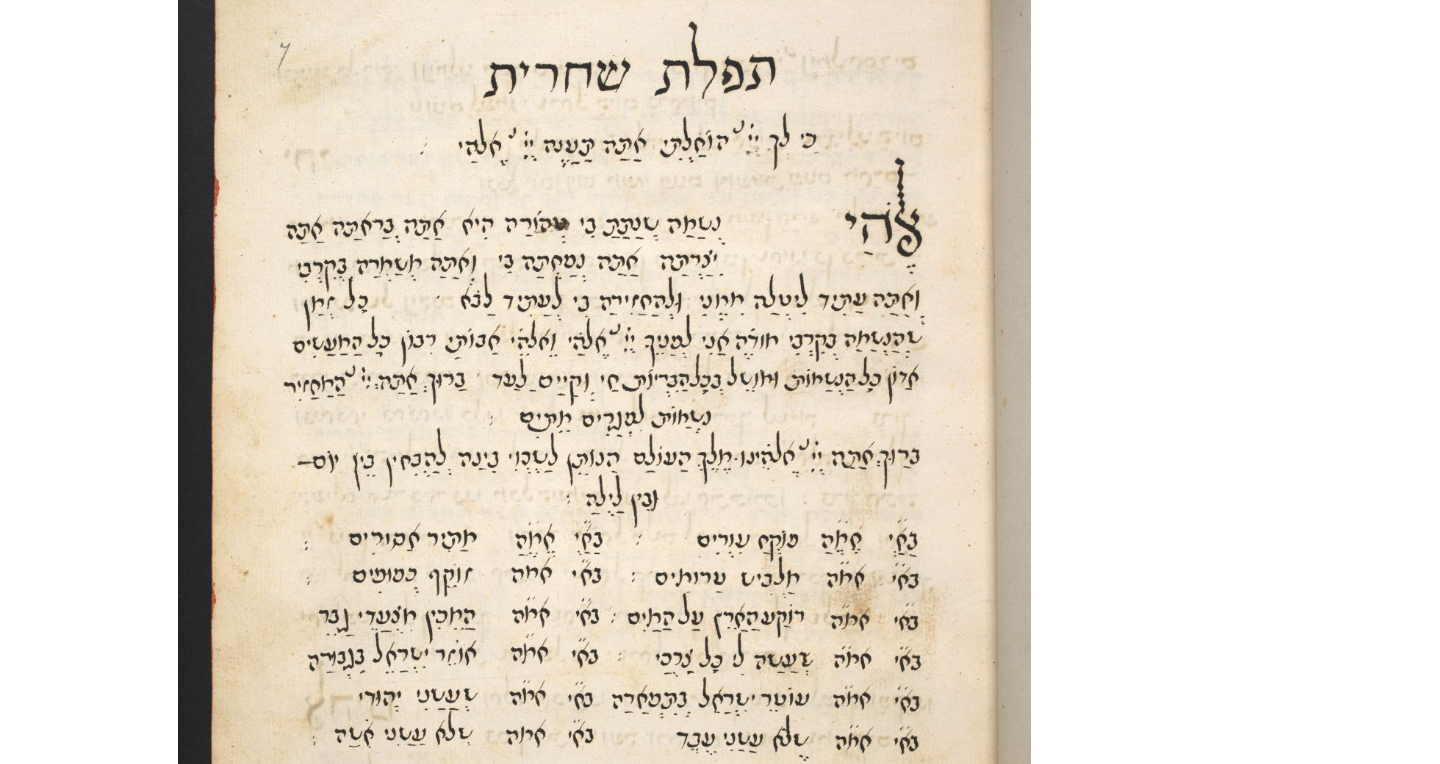
17th century Hebrew cursive manuscript from the Provence region

The modern period is documented first by the òbras (or obro), liturgical poems of the 17th and 18th centuries that alternate Hebrew and Provençal lines, many of them recited during circumcisions and mostly attributed to Mardochée Astruc. Several of these poems were published in 1891 by Emperor Pedro II of Brazil. Astruc also wrote a tragedy on Esther, printed in 1774.

The most important modern source is Harcanot et Barcanot, a comedy written around 1820 by Israël Bédarride. Although set in pre-Revolutionary Carpentras and composed after the community had dispersed, it is considered to reflect the spoken language of the former Comtat. A travel report published in 1843 includes a transcription of the Shema prayer in Latin letters, documenting the community's distinctive pronunciation of Hebrew at that date. In the 1890s, Raoul Hirschler published wordlists collected from elderly informants, children of the last generation of Jews raised in the Comtat. In this later period the script situation was reversed: the texts are written in Latin letters and are filled with words of Hebrew or Aramaic origin, whose embedded forms can be difficult to identify.

Other sources must be used with caution. The statutes of the Jewish communities survive only in translations prepared for the papal administration by non-Jewish scribes, the Hebrew originals being lost, and preserve little beyond scattered Hebrew terms such as the names of the Jewish months. A body of plays, Christmas carols and poems by non-Jewish authors portrays Jews speaking in a distinctive way, including a Christmas pageant performed at Séguret, carols featuring Jewish characters, and a mock sermon, Lou Sermoun di Jusiou ('The Sermon of the Jew'), delivered annually in Carpentras by a gentile dressed as a Jew and traditionally (though probably wrongly) attributed to Cardinal Jacques Sadolet. Mocking Jewish speech was apparently a common pastime in the Comtat, and although such texts may distort or exaggerate, they can be useful when checked against other evidence.

The last traces of the language appear in the writings of the novelist Armand Lunel, often described as its last speaker. Lunel learned the language from his grandparents, not his parents, and never used it as an everyday means of communication; the Judeo-Occitan elements in his writings often derive from earlier publications rather than from living speech. He nevertheless remained a direct source for academic knowledge of the language. Judeo-Provençal became extinct with Lunel's death in 1977.

== History ==
=== Middle Ages ===
Jews were present in southern Gaul from Roman times, perhaps as early as the first century CE, although there is no certainty that the communities attested in the early Middle Ages descend from them.

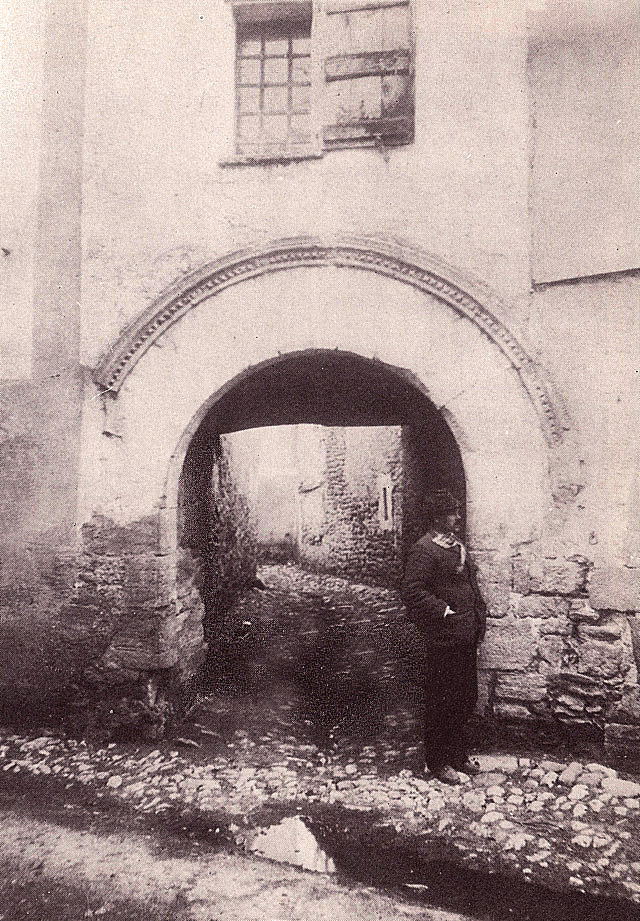
Door of the old Jewish quarter of Malaucène destroyed on the orders of John XXII

The first important community is documented at Narbonne under Frankish rule, where Pepin the Short installed a Babylonian Jew, Makhir ben Yehudah Zakkai, at the head of a Jewish fief. The language of these early Narbonne Jews is unknown: it cannot have been Provençal, which is not attested before about 1060, and given the community's Babylonian origins it may long have remained Arabic.

By the mid-12th century, however, the local Jews no longer understood Arabic, which is why David Kimhi produced his Sefer ha-Shorashim as a Hebrew adaptation of an Arabic original. In the 12th and 13th centuries the bulk of Occitan-speaking Jewry lived in Languedoc, around Béziers. Their situation deteriorated after the Albigensian Crusade (1209–1229), which brought Languedoc under French control and introduced the Inquisition.

The Jews were expelled from the Kingdom of France by Philip IV in 1306, recalled in 1315, expelled again in the early 1320s, readmitted in 1359, and definitively expelled in 1395. None of these measures applied to Provence, which was still independent of the French crown.

When France absorbed Provence in 1481, its Jews were expelled in turn, a measure fully enforced by 1501. A further expulsion from the Principality of Orange followed. Only two areas remained where Jews could live legally: the County of Nice with the neighbouring Occitan-speaking valleys of Piedmont, and the papal enclave of Avignon and the Comtat Venaissin. After 1501 the enclave was an island with a Jewish minority surrounded by a France without Jews.

=== Modern period ===
Within the enclave, the Jews suffered violence and were progressively confined. In the second half of the 15th century they were restricted to a single street, the carrière, in each town where they lived, in 1453 in Cavaillon and in 1486 in Carpentras. From 1555, the bull Cum nimis absurdum of Pope Paul IV imposed a policy of ghettoisation, and from 1624 the Jews of the enclave could reside only in the ghettos of Avignon, Carpentras, Cavaillon and L'Isle-sur-la-Sorgue, which came to be known as the "four holy communities".

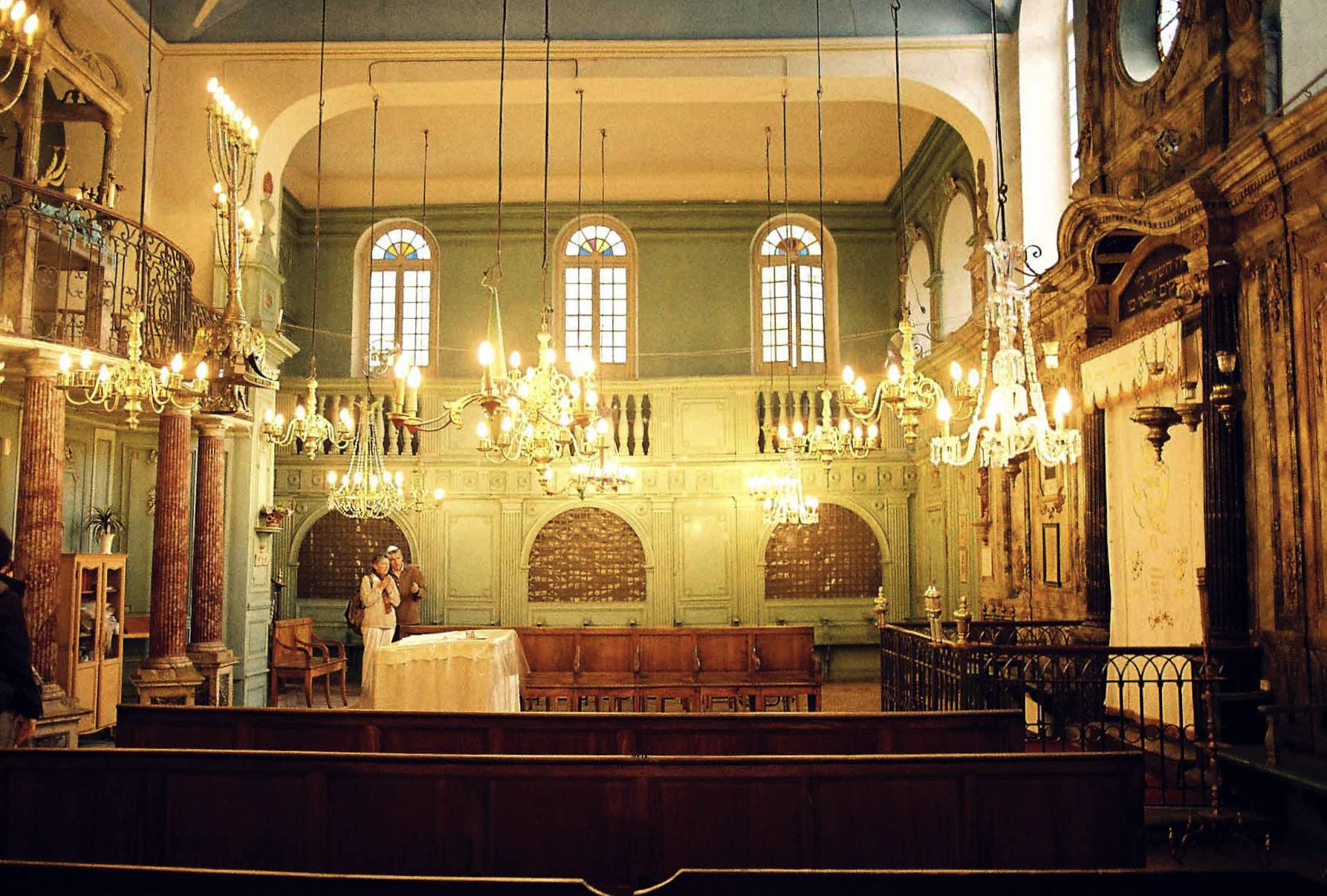
Synagogue of Carpentras, the oldest synagogue in France in use today

This isolation lasted from 1501 to 1791, and in such circumstances, as Jochnowitz observes, it was natural for the community's language to diverge from that of its neighbours; the modern Jewish variety was spoken only in these four towns.

In 1791, following a plebiscite, the enclave joined revolutionary France; the carrières were abolished and the Jews emancipated. Most left for the larger cities and quickly abandoned their distinctive customs, liturgy, pronunciation and dialect. Never numbering more than a few thousand, they scattered across southern France and Paris, integrating into the general population and into the established Portuguese Jewish communities. Compulsory schooling in French and the general decline of Occitan eroded what remained of the dialect.

By 1843 the former Comtat Jews were already far less isolated from other Jewish communities. Those who stayed were submerged by successive waves of Jewish immigration to southern France: Alsatians, Eastern European Ashkenazim, Sephardim from Greece and Turkey, and finally North African Jews, especially after the independence of Morocco and Tunisia in 1956 and of Algeria in 1962. Jewish ritual and culture in the Comtat today are mostly North African. The specifically Provençal Jewish identity has disappeared, its memory maintained by descendants of the carrière communities through the Association culturelle des Juifs du Pape and its newsletter L'Écho des Carrières.

The spoken language itself became extinct in the 20th century with the death of Armand Lunel in 1977.

== Phonology ==
Judeo-Provençal had a number of phonological characteristics that are not found in other Occitan dialects.

One of the most salient features is that, in words derived from Latin, Provençal /ʒ/ and /dʒ/ were realized /ʃ/ and /tʃ/. Other phonetic features have been recorded.

Words borrowed from Hebrew were pronounced according to the distinctive Provençal phonetic norm of Hebrew. Among other features, the letters samekh, sin, tsade and taw raphe were all pronounced /f/. Hebrew words were largely adapted to Provençal phonology.

== Sample text ==
Judeo-Provençal	English
Eftaḥ śefatai be-rina cantaren deman a dina	Let me open my lips in joy tomorrow we will sing during dinner
Irʾat Adonai le-maʿana	The fear of God is our share
Qu’aco es lou bon mestre	As he is the good lord
Ve-odeh na le-el elom [sic for elyon] dessu tanbourin e i vioulon	And let me praise God the most high on tambourines and violins
Es vengu lou Cadoch barourhou Qu'avé chorhéta lou malarhama	Then came the holy one blessed be he who slaughtered the angel of death
