= Benedictus Deus (Pius IV) =

1564 papal bull

Benedictus Deus Latin for 'Blessed God' Papal bull of Pope Pius IV
- Signature date: 26 January 1564
- Subject: Ratification of the decisions of the Council of Trent

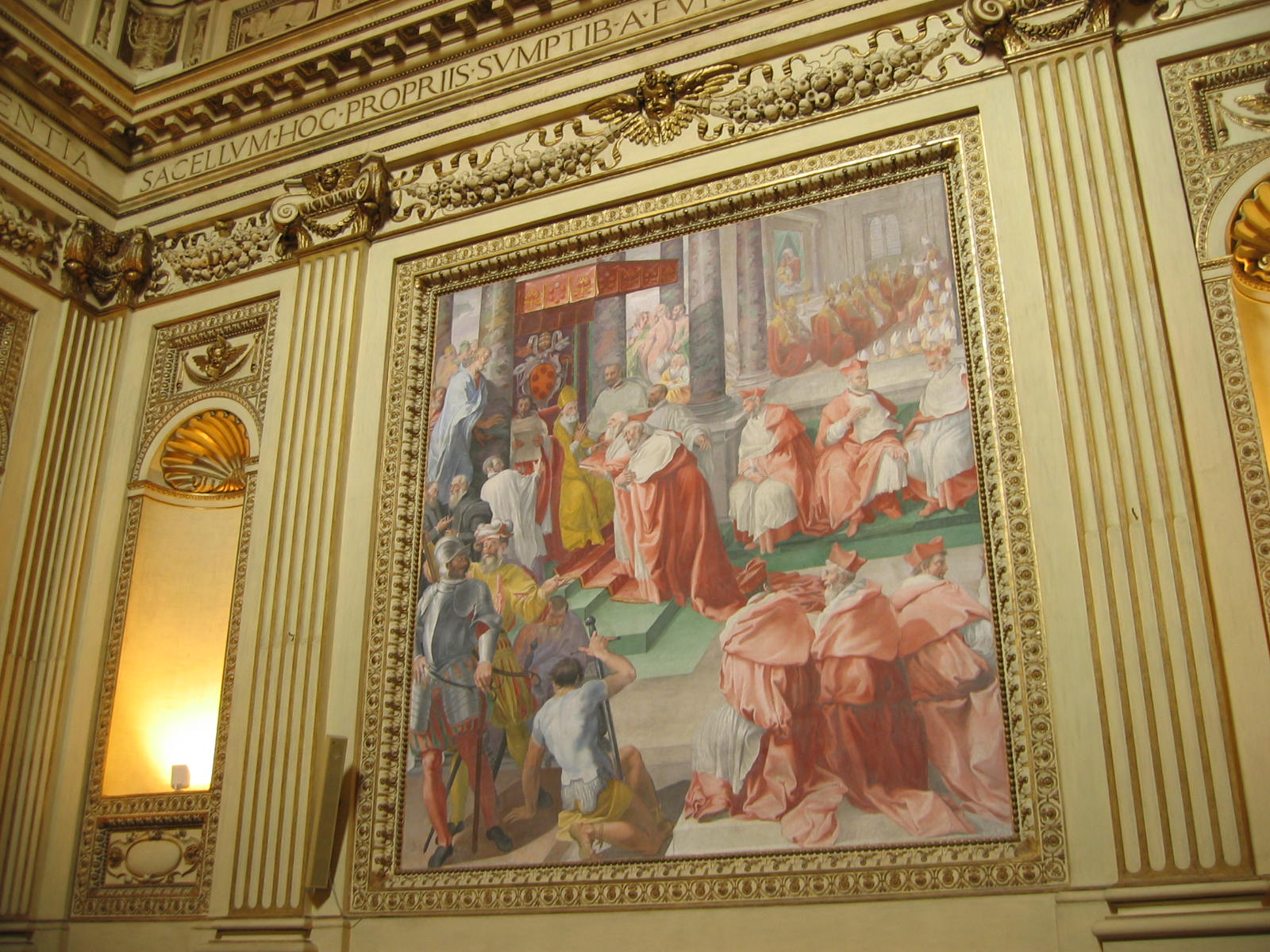
Pope Pius IV promulgates the bull "Benedictus Deus"

Benedictus Deus is a papal bull written by Pius IV in 1564 which ratified all decrees and definitions of the Council of Trent. It maintains that the decrees of the Council of Trent can be interpreted solely by the Papal office itself; and enjoins strict obedience upon all Catholics, forbidding, under pain of excommunication, all unauthorized interpretation. This was seen by Church contemporaries of Pius IV as an attempt to strengthen the influence of the Papacy against the rise of Conciliarism exemplified by the Council of Trent itself.

There is a more minor bull of the same title written by Benedict XII in 1336.

== Bibliography ==
- Bulla S.D.N.D. Pii Divina Providentia papae quarti super confirmatione oecumenii & generalis concilii Tridentini. Mexicopoli: Ocharte, 1565 Text at archive.org
- The full text of Benedictus Deus (Pius IV) at Wikisource
