= Benkt =

Benkt is a Swedish masculine given name. Notable people with the name include:

- Benkt Austrin (1909–1974), Swedish sports shooter
- Benkt-Åke Benktsson (1907–1957), Swedish film actor
- Benkt Norelius (1886–1974), Swedish gymnast
- Benkt Sparre (1918–1986), Swedish botanist

== See also ==
- Bent (surname)
