= Benedita Barata da Rocha =

Portuguese immunologist (1949–2021)

Benedita Barata da Rocha (24 February 1949 – 2 October 2021) was a Portuguese immunologist.

She earned her M.D. 1972 from the University of Lisbon, and her Ph.D. 1978 from the University of Glasgow, Scotland, UK. She was "directeur de recherche classe exceptionel" (DRCE) of the CNRS and director of a research unit of the INSERM at the Necker Institute, Paris, France. Her major scientific contributions are in the areas of T cell immune tolerance, T cell memory and development of intraepithelial lymphocytes.

In 2007 she received the CNRS Silver Medal award and in 2009 a European Research Council advanced grant. She published more than 100 research articles.

== Major works ==
- Rocha, B; von Boehmer, H (8 March 1991). "Peripheral selection of the T cell repertoire". Science. 251 (4998): 1225–8. Bibcode:1991Sci...251.1225R. doi:10.1126/science.1900951. PMID 1900951.
- Tanchot, C; Lemonnier, FA; Pérarnau, B; Freitas, AA; Rocha, B (27 June 1997). "Differential requirements for survival and proliferation of CD8 naïve or memory T cells". Science. 276 (5321): 2057–62. doi:10.1126/science.276.5321.2057. PMID 9197272. S2CID 10349085.
- Veiga-Fernandes, H; Walter, U; Bourgeois, C; McLean, A; Rocha, B (July 2000). "Response of naïve and memory CD8+ T cells to antigen stimulation in vivo". Nature Immunology. 1 (1): 47–53. doi:10.1038/76907. PMID 10881174. S2CID 23616903.
- Peaudecerf, L; dos Santos, PR; Boudil, A; Ezine, S; Pardigon, N; Rocha, B (January 2011). "The role of the gut as a primary lymphoid organ: CD8αα intraepithelial T lymphocytes in euthymic mice derive from very immature CD44+ thymocyte precursors". Mucosal Immunology. 4 (1): 93–101. doi:10.1038/mi.2010.47. PMID 20737000.
