= Benedict (canon of St. Peter's) =

Roman liturgic writer of 12th century

Benedictus Canonicus Sancti Petri ("Benedict, canon of St. Peter's") was a religious and liturgical writer from Rome active in the first half of the 12th century. Benedict was one of the four canons of the old Basilica of St. Peter, who celebrated mass in the church; almost nothing is known about his life. He is the author of the Liber polypticus (or Liber Politicus), which, among others, contains the Ordo Romanus; this book was written between 1140 and 1143 when he was already advanced in years. His work is important because of the contained information about institutions and religious celebrations and feasts of 12th-century Rome.

== Sources ==
- Filippo Ermini (1930). "BENEDETTO canonico di San Pietro". Enciclopedia Italiana (in Italian).
- Mario da Bergamo (1966). "BENEDETTO". Dizionario Biografico degli Italiani (in Italian).
