= Kauko Hakkarainen =

Finnish footballer (1932–2020)

Personal information
- Date of birth: 30 December 1932
- Date of death: 15 March 2020 (aged 87)

International career
Years	Team	Apps	(Gls)
1956–1959	Finland	10	(0)

Kauko Hakkarainen (30 December 1932 – 15 March 2020) was a Finnish footballer. He played in ten matches for the Finland national football team from 1956 to 1959. Hakkarainen died on 15 March 2020, at the age of 87.
