= Benedetta Berti =

International relations scholar

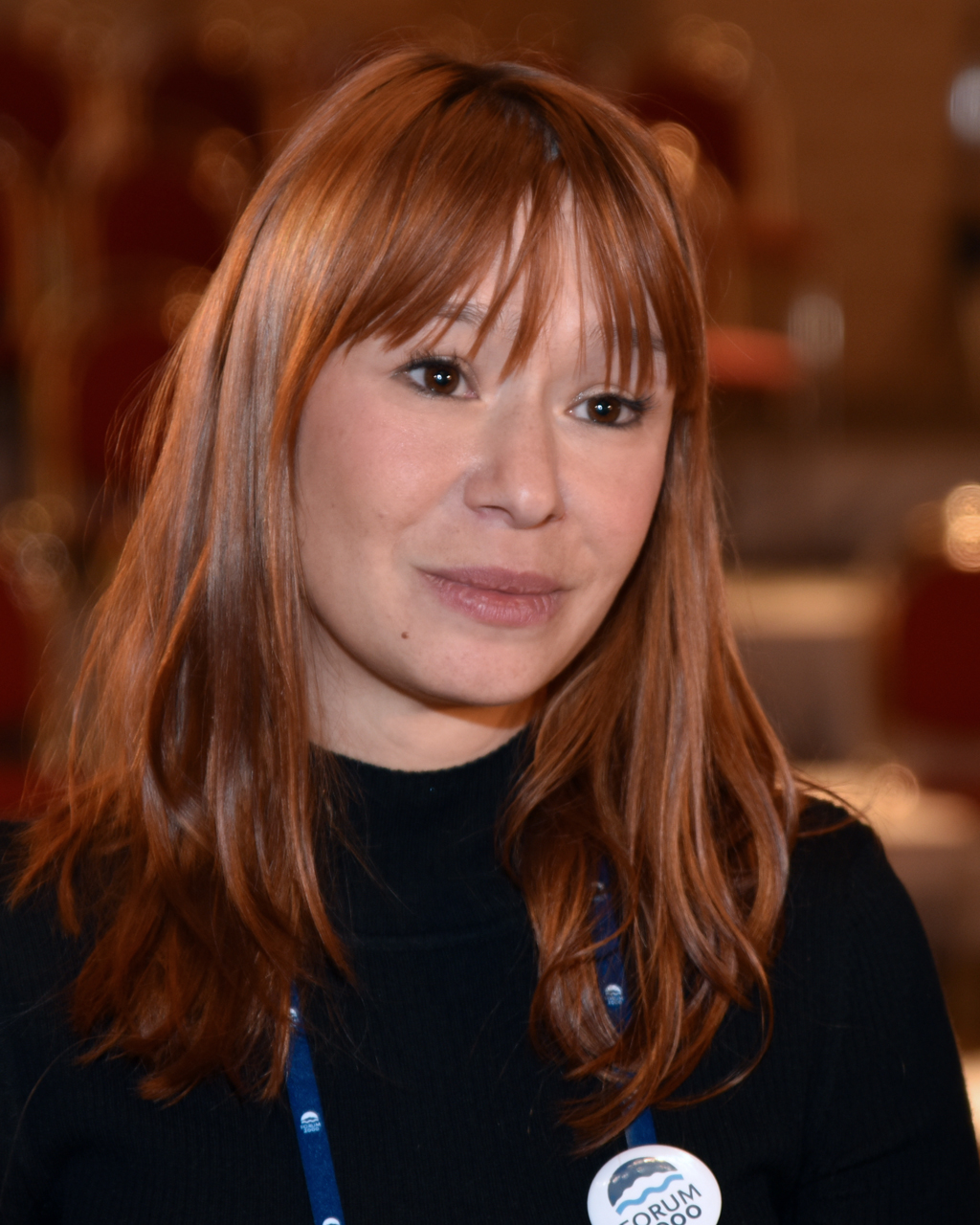
- Education: Tufts University
- Awards: Order of the Star of Italy
- Website: www.benedettaberti.com

Benedetta Berti is a scholar of international relations, an expert on militant groups, and Secretary General of the NATO Parliamentary Assembly at NATO. She joined NATO after 15 years in scholarly roles. In NATO, she worked primarily under Secretary General Jens Stoltenberg.

Berti graduated from the University of Bologna (BA) and has her PhD in International Relations from the Fletcher School at Tufts University. She has worked at West Point, the Institute for National Security Studies, and Tel Aviv University, and Foreign Policy Research Institute. She was a TED fellow, with talks in 2015, 2018, and 2022.

Berti is the author of three academic books: Armed Political Organizations: From Conflict to Integration (Johns Hopkins University Press, 2013), Democratization in EU Foreign Policy: New Member States as Drivers of Democracy Promotion (Routledge, 2015), and, with a co-author, Hezbollah and Hamas: A Comparative Study (Johns Hopkins University Press, 2012). She has conducted research in the emerging field of rebel governance.

== Bibliography ==
Berti, Benedetta. “Armed Groups as Political Parties and Their Role in Electoral Politics: The Case of Hizballah.” Studies in Conflict & Terrorism 34, no. 12 (December 1, 2011): 942–62. https://doi.org/10.1080/1057610X.2011.621115.

———. Armed Political Organizations: From Conflict to Integration. Johns Hopkins University Press, 2013.

———. “Beyond the Transition Paradigm: Political and Judicial Reform in the ‘New Middle East.’” Mediterranean Politics 20, no. 3 (September 2, 2015): 427–32. https://doi.org/10.1080/13629395.2015.1042711.

———. “Contemporary Conflict and Political Violence in the Levant.” In Routledge Handbook of US Counterterrorism and Irregular Warfare Operations, 71–82. Routledge, 2021. https://www.taylorfrancis.com/chapters/oa-edit/10.4324/9781003164500-7/contemporary-conflict-political-violence-levant-benedetta-berti.

———. “Forcible Intervention in Libya: Revamping the ‘Politics of Human Protection’?” Global Change, Peace & Security 26, no. 1 (January 2, 2014): 21–39. https://doi.org/10.1080/14781158.2014.859131.

———. “From ‘Rebel Justice’to the ‘Rule of Law’: The Cases of Hamas and Hezbollah.” In The Effects of Rebel Parties on Governance, Democracy and Stability after Civil Wars, 53–68. Routledge, 2022. https://www.taylorfrancis.com/chapters/edit/10.4324/9781003254386-5/rebel-justice-rule-law-benedetta-berti.

———. “Is There a Straight Path for Europe?” In The Fletcher Forum of World Affairs, 30:241–44. JSTOR, 2006. https://www.jstor.org/stable/45289660

———. “Non-State Actors as Providers of Governance: The Hamas Government in Gaza between Effective Sovereignty, Centralized Authority, and Resistance.” The Middle East Journal 69, no. 1 (January 15, 2015): 9–31. https://doi.org/10.3751/69.1.11.

———. “Rebel Groups between Adaptation and Ideological Continuity: The Impact of Sustained Political Participation.” Government and Opposition 54, no. 3 (June 2019): 513–35. https://doi.org/10.1017/gov.2018.44.

———. “Rebel Politics and the State: Between Conflict and Post-Conflict, Resistance and Co-Existence.” Civil Wars 18, no. 2 (April 2, 2016): 118–36. https://doi.org/10.1080/13698249.2016.1205560.

———. “Saudi Arabia’s Foreign Policy on Iran and the Proxy War in Syria: Toward a New Chapter? Israel Journal of Foreign Affairs: Vol 8, No 3.” Accessed September 29, 2024. https://doi.org/10.1080/23739770.2014.11446600.

———. “Securing a Role for International Human Rights Law in Counter Terrorism: The Role of Judicial Review in the United Kingdom.” New England Journal of Political Science 3, no. 2 (2009): 4.

———. “The Ethics of Insurgency: A Critical Guide to Just Guerrilla Warfare.” Israel Journal of Foreign Affairs 10, no. 1 (January 2, 2016): 135–39. https://doi.org/10.1080/23739770.2016.1151197.

———. “The Israeli Citizenship Model: The Role of Pluralism and Particularism in Drawing the Boundaries of the Israeli Polity.” al Nakhlah (Fletcher School) 2009, Issue 11. Accessed September 29, 2024.

———. “The Uprising in Syria and the Implications for Lebanon: All Quiet on the Levant Front?” Accessed September 29, 2024. https://www.jstor.org/stable/pdf/resrep08944.13.pdf.

———. “Violent and Criminal Non-State Actors.” edited by Thomas Risse, Tanja A. Börzel, and Anke Draude, The Oxford Handbook of Governance and Limited Statehood:272–90. Oxford University Press, 2018.

———. “What’s in a Name? Re-Conceptualizing Non-State Armed Groups in the Middle East.” Palgrave Communications 2, no. 1 (November 29, 2016): 1–8. https://doi.org/10.1057/palcomms.2016.89.

Berti, Benedetta, and Ruben-Erik Diaz-Plaja. “Two Ages of NATO Efforts to Project Stability — Change and Continuity.” Projecting Stability: NATO Defense College, 2018. https://www.jstor.org/stable/resrep19962.9.

Berti, Benedetta, and David Friedman. “Regional Proliferation and the ‘Arab Spring,’” 2013. Berti, Benedetta, Kristina Mikulova, and Nicu Popescu. Democratization in EU Foreign Policy. Routledge. (2015).

Berti, Benedetta, and Olga Onuch. “From the ‘colour Revolutions’ to the Arab Awakening: EU Approaches to Democracy Promotion and the Rising Influence of CEE States.” In Democratization in EU Foreign Policy, 61–82. Routledge, 2015.

Berti, Benedetta, and Caroline du Plessix. “The EU, Israel and the Arab Awakening. Clashing Perceptions, Diverging Policies?” Bulletin Du Centre de Recherche Français à Jérusalem, no. 25 (2014). https://journals.openedition.org/bcrfj/7372.

Berti, Benedetta, and Elizabeth Tsurkov. “Human Security and Humanitarian Trends in Gaza: Looking at the Past Decade.” The Crisis of the Gaza Strip: A Way Out, n.d., 69–70.

Gleis, Joshua L., and Benedetta Berti. Hezbollah and Hamas: A Comparative Study. JHU Press, 2012.

Mikulova, Kristina, and Benedetta Berti. “9 Re-Packaging the Transition Know-How?” Democratization in EU Foreign Policy: New Member States as Drivers of Democracy Promotion, 2015, 177.

———. “Converts to Missionaries.” Central and Eastern European, 2013. https://www.jstor.org/stable/pdf/resrep12757.pdf.
