= Benedicto =

- Gender: Male

Other names
- Related names: Benedicta, Benedict

Benedicto is both a given name and a surname. Notable people with the name include:

- Benedicto Caldarella (born 1939), Argentine motorcycle road racer
- Benedicto Godoy Véizaga, Bolivian footballer who played in the 1950 World Cup
- Benedicto Kiwanuka (1922–1972), first Prime Minister of Uganda
- Benedicto de Moraes Menezes (1906-?), Brazilian footballer
- Benedicto "Magnum" Membrere (born 1982), Filipino basketball player
- Benedicto Villablanca (born 1957), Chilean former professional boxer
- Joaquín Dicenta Benedicto (1862–1917), Spanish journalist, novelist, playwright and poet
- José E. Benedicto, Treasurer of Puerto Rico
- Lourdes Benedicto (born 1974), American actress
- Roberto Benedicto (1917–2000), Filipino lawyer, ambassador, diplomat, and banker and founder of Banahaw Broadcasting Corporation
- Benedicto - Weeble Mascot and dog to William Harragin.

== See also ==
- Leo de Benedicto Christiano (11th century), convert to Christianity
- Benedict (disambiguation)
- Benedicta
- Benedictum
- Benedictus (disambiguation)
- Don Salvador Benedicto
- San Benedicto
