= Benediktas Vilmantas Rupeika =

Lithuanian politician

Benediktas Vilmantas Rupeika (born 24 March 1944 in Telšiai District Municipality) is a Lithuanian politician. In 1990 he was among those who signed the Act of the Re-Establishment of the State of Lithuania.

== Bibliography ==
- Biography (in Lithuanian)
