= Pentti Hakkarainen (psychologist) =

Lithuanian educational psychologist

- Born: Pentti Ensio Hakkarainen; 6 June 1944
- Died: 1 June 2021 (aged 76)
- Education: University of Jyväskylä
- Scientific career
- Fields: Psychology
- Workplaces: University of Oulu, Lithuanian University of Educational Sciences

Pentti Ensio Hakkarainen (6 June 1944 – 1 June 2021) was a Finnish educational psychologist.

== Education and career ==
He graduated from the University of Jyväskylä in 1967, where he went on to obtain a master's degree and then a Ph.D. in 1970 and 1972, respectively. Hakkarainen defended his habilitated doctoral thesis in 1991. During the period of 1997–2011 he worked as professor at the University of Oulu and was elected as vice-dean of the Department of Educational Sciences in 2006. He was a professor of Lithuanian University of Educational Sciences since 2012 where he headed the Research Laboratory of Play (LUES, VMU). He was editor-in-chief of Journal of Russian & East European Psychology and served on the editorial boards of Forum Oświatowe and Cultural-Historical Psychology. His research interests included creative, developmental teaching and learning in preschools, schools and higher education, narrative learning and development in play and virtual environments. He published a number of books in Finnish, English, and Lithuanian.
