= Benedykt Dobszewicz =

Polish-Lithuanian physicist (1722–1794)

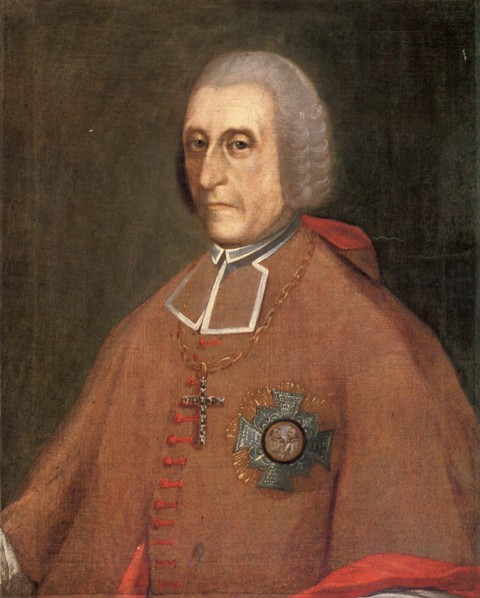
- Born: 12 March 1722; Samogitia, Grand Duchy of Lithuania
- Died: Unknown

Education
- Education: Vilnius University

Benedykt Dobszewicz (Lithuanian: Benediktas Dobševičius; 12 March 1722 – after 1792) was a philosopher and physicist of the Grand Duchy of Lithuania. A later adherent of cartesianism, Dobszewicz is considered the most prominent philosopher during the period of the collapse of scholasticism in Lithuania. Dobszewicz argued that there are three types of knowledge: historical, philosophical, and mathematical. Dobszewicz probably influenced the philosophy of Anioł Dowgird.

== Biography ==
Benedykt Dobszewicz was born on 12 March 1722 near Kražiai. In 1739, he joined the Jesuit Order. He studied at the Novogrudok Jesuit College. In 1752, he graduated from the theology faculty of Vilnius University, where he was a professor of mathematics from 1784 to 1757. From 1757 to 1768, Dobszewicz lectured on logic and mathematics in Kražiai. He also briefly lectured on philosophy in Novogrudok from 1759 to 1760. Thereafter, Dobszewicz returned to Vilnius University, becoming a professor of philosophy from 1760 to 1763 and professor of theology from 1765 to 1768. In 1773, he became Doctor of Canon Law. From 1773 to 1774, Dobszewicz acted as Vilnius University's vice-chancellor. From 1782 Dobszewicz acted as a director of a school in Kražiai. He died sometime after 1792.

== Works ==
Dobszewicz compared contemporary philosophy with theology and scholastics. Dobszewicz published Placita recentiorum philosophorum (lit. 'View of contemporary philosophers') in 1760, where he discussed contemporary theories of natural science. Dobszewicz also wrote on Newtonian physics, summarized René Descartes's and Pierre Gassendi's interpretations of matter, John Locke's primary–secondary quality distinction, as well as George Berkeley's subjective idealism.

In 1761, Dobszewicz, influenced by Christian Wolff, published Praelectiones logicae (lit. 'Lectures on logic'), where he analyzed concepts of logic, problems of methods, and supported Descartes's view on intellectual intuition. The work attempts to connect traditional rationalism with empiricism, arguing that classical logic treats mathematics with respect, without which philosophizing or logicizing "is all the same as walking without legs".
