= Benedictus (given name) =

- Gender: Male

Origin
- Origin: Latin
- Meaning: "blessed"

Other names
- Related names: Benedicto, Benedicta, Benedict, Benedictum, Benedic

Benedictus is a given name. It might be the Latin parallel for Baruch. Notable people with the name include:

- Benedictus Appenzeller (c. 1480 – 1558), Franco-Flemish singer and composer
- Benedictus Arias Montanus (1527–1598), Spanish orientalist
- Benedictus Buns (1642–1716), German/Dutch priest and composer
- Benedictus Marwood Kelly (1785–1867), British naval officer
- Benedictus Aretius (1505–1574), Swiss Protestant theologian and natural philosopher
- Benedictus van Haeften (1588–1648), Provost of Affligem Abbey and a writer of religious works
- Benedictus Spinoza (1632–1677), also known as Baruch Spinoza, a Portuguese-Jewish philosopher famous for being "The First Secular".

Benedictus is also the Latin form of the name Benedict borne by many figures including Pope Benedict XVI.
