= Benoît =

- Pronunciation: French: [bənwa]
- Gender: Male
- Language: Old French

Origin
- Meaning: "blessed"
- Region of origin: France

Other names
- Alternative spelling: Benoist, Benoit
- Related names: Benoîte, Bénédicte

Benoît
- Pronunciation: French: [bənwa]
- Language: Old French

Origin
- Meaning: "blessed"
- Region of origin: France

Other names
- Variant forms: Bennett, Bennet, Benedict

Benoît (French: [bənwa]) is a French male given name. It is less frequently spelled Benoist. The name comes from the Latin word benedictus, which means "blessed", equivalent in meaning to Bénédicte or the English name Benedict. A female derivative of the name is Benoîte.

The personal name Benoît is to be distinguished from Benoit as a family name, which is usually spelled without the circumflex accent. Early form of the name was spelled with an "s" (Benoist), but as with many words in the French language, the "s" was eventually replaced with a circumflex accent over the "i".

== Given name ==
- Benoît Assou-Ekotto (born 1984), Cameroonian footballer
- Benoît Badiashile (born 2001), French footballer
- Benoit Benjamin (born 1964), American basketball player
- Benoît Bouchard (born 1940), Canadian public official and former politician
- Benoît Brunet (born 1968), Canadian retired hockey player
- Benoît Cassart (born 1970), Belgian politician
- Benoît Charest (born 1964), Canadian guitarist and film score composer
- Benoit Charette (born 1976), Canadian politician
- Benoît Paul Émile Clapeyron (1799–1864), French engineer and physicist
- Benoît-Constant Coquelin (1841–1909), French stage and film actor
- Benoît David (born 1966), Canadian singer
- Benoît Dorémus (born 1980) French singer-songwriter
- Benoît Ferreux (born 1955), French film actor
- Benoît Jacquot (born 1947), French film director
- Benoît Lacroix (1915–2016), Canadian theologian, philosopher, Dominican priest, professor and historian
- Benoît Hamon (born 1967), French former MEP and current spokesperson for the Socialist Party of France
- Benoît Hogue (born 1966), Canadian retired hockey player
- Benoît Larrouquis (born 1969), French politician
- Benoît Magimel (born 1974), French actor
- Benoît Mandelbrot (1924–2010), French mathematician, the "father of fractal geometry"
- Benoît Paire (born 1989), French professional tennis player
- Benoît Pedretti (born 1980), French football (soccer) player
- Benoît Peeters (born 1956), French comics writer, novelist, and critic
- Benoît Poelvoorde (born 1964), Belgian actor
- Benoît Richaud (born 1988), French figure skater
- Benoît de Sainte-Maure (before 1160 – 1173), medieval French poet
- Benoît Sokal (1954–2021), Belgian comic artist and video game developer
- Benoît Tréluyer (born 1976), French race car driver
- Benoît Tremblay (born 1948), former member of the Canadian House of Commons
- Benoît Vaugrenard (born 1982), French professional cyclist

== Surname ==
- André Benoit (born 1984), Canadian hockey player
- Andy Benoit (born 1986), American sportswriter
- Avril Benoit (before 1990), Canadian broadcast journalist
- Bob Benoit (horse racing) (1927–2008), general manager of the Hollywood Park race track
- Brian Benoit (before 1999), American metal-core guitarist
- Chris Benoit (1967–2007), Canadian professional wrestler
- Clinton Benoit (born 1973), Haitian musician
- Christine Benoit (born 1972), Seychellois Anglican priest
- David Benoit (born 1953), American jazz pianist
- David Benoit (actor) (born 1966), American actor and singer
- David Benoit (basketball) (born 1968), American basketball player
- Francine Benoît (1894-1990), French-Portuguese musician, teacher, composer, conductor, and music critic
- Georges Benoît (1883–1942), French cinematographer and actor
- Germaine Benoit (1901–1983), French chemical engineer, pharmacologist and biologist
- Hubert Benoit (born 1963), Canadian politician
- Hubert Benoit (psychotherapist) (1904–1992) French psychotherapist
- Jacques Benoit (born 1955), French painter
- Jacques Benoit (biologist), (1896-1982), French biologist and physician
- Jason Benoit (born 1984), Canadian country music singer/songwriter
- Joan Benoit (born 1957), American first women's Olympic marathon champion
- Joaquín Benoit (born 1977), Dominican baseball pitcher
- John J. Benoit (1951–2016), American law enforcement officer and politician
- Justin-Mirande René Benoit (1844–1922), French physicist
- Leon Benoit (born 1950), Canadian politician
- Luigi Benoit (1804–1890), Italian ornithologist and conchologist
- Maurice Benoit (1932–2013), Canadian ice hockey player
- Michel Benoit (born 1949), French chess player
- Nancy Benoit (1964–2007), American professional wrestling valet murdered by her husband, Chris Benoit
- Paul Benoit (1850–1915), French-born Canadian Roman Catholic priest
- Paul Benoit (composer) (1893–1979), French monk and composer of organ music
- Pedro Benoit (1836–1897), Argentine architect, engineer, and urbanist
- Peter Benoit (1834–1901), Belgian composer
- Pierre Benoit (disambiguation)
- Ryan Benoit (born 1989), American mixed martial artist
- Silvia Benoit, Swiss curler
- Simon Benoit (born 1998), Canadian ice hockey player
- Tab Benoit (born 1967), American blues guitarist
- Ted Benoit (1947–2016), French comics artist, graphic novelist
- Yasmin Benoit (born 1996), British model and asexual and aromantic activist and researcher

== See also ==
- Kelly Benoit-Bird (born 1976), American marine biologist
- Nicole Schnyder-Benoit (born 1973), Swiss beach volleyball player
- Benoist, a list of people with the surname or given name
