= Benoist =

Benoist is both a French surname and a given name. Notable people with the name include:

== Surnames ==
- Alain de Benoist (born 1943), French academic and philosopher
- Antoine Benoist (painter) (1632–1717), French artist who was painter and sculptor to Louis XIV
- Antoine Benoist (engraver) (by 1721–1770), French draughtsman and engraver in London
- Antoine-Gabriel-François Benoist (1715–1776), French soldier
- Élie Benoist (1640–1728), French Protestant minister, known as an historian of the Edict of Nantes
- Félix Benoist (1818–1896), French painter and lithographer
- François Benoist (1794–1878), French organist, composer, and pedagogue
- Françoise-Albine Benoist (1724–1808 or 1809), French writer
- Gabriel Benoist (1891–1964), a French writer in the Cauchois dialect of the Norman language
- Grégory Benoist (born 1983), Belgian jockey based in France
- Guillaume Philippe Benoist (1725–1770), French line-engraver
- Jacques Benoist-Méchin (1901–1983), French politician and writer
- Jean Benoist (1929–2025), Canadian-French doctor and anthropologist
- Joseph Roger de Benoist (1923–2017), French missionary, journalist, and historian
- Lance Benoist (born 1988), American mixed martial artist
- Louis Auguste Benoist (1803–1867), pioneering American banker and financier
- Luc Benoist (1893–1980), French essayist
- Marcel Benoist (died 1918), French lawyer who established the Swiss Marcel Benoist Prize
- Marie-Guillemine Benoist (1768–1826), French neoclassical, historical and genre painter
- Melissa Benoist (born 1988), American actress and singer
- Michel Benoist (1715–1774), French Jesuit scientist noted for his service to the Chinese Empire
- Raymond Benoist (1881–1970), French zoologist and botanist
- Robert Benoist (1895–1944), French Grand Prix motor racing driver and World War II secret agent
- Thomas W. Benoist (1874–1917), American aviator, aircraft manufacturer, and airline entrepreneur

== Given names ==
- Benoist Simmat, French author and journalist
- Benoist Stehlin (c. 1732 – 1774), French harpsichord builder

== See also ==
- Condé Benoist Pallen (1858–1929), American Catholic editor and author
- Benois
- Benoit (disambiguation)
