= Benoist (disambiguation) =

Benoist is both a given name and a surname.

Benoist may also refer to:

== Places ==
- Le Mesnil-Benoist, commune in the Calvados department in the Basse-Normandie region in northwestern France
- Plessis-Saint-Benoist commune in the Essonne department in Île-de-France in northern France
- Saint-Benoist-sur-Mer, commune (in the Vendée department in the Pays de la Loire region in western France
- Saint-Benoist-sur-Vanne, commune in the Aube department in north-central France

== Aircraft ==
- Benoist Aircraft, an American aircraft manufacturing company
- Benoist Land Tractor Type XII, an American airplane of 1912, one of the first enclosed-cockpit, tractor-configuration aircraft
- Benoist XIV, a small American biplane flying boat of 1913

== Other uses ==
- Benoist (tea), a type of tea popularized by the Japanese drama Densha Otoko

== See also ==
- Condé Benoist Pallen (1858-1929), American Catholic editor and author
- Benois
- Benoit (disambiguation)
