= William Nast =

William Nast may refer to:

- William Nast (Methodist) (1807–1899), German-American religious leader and editor
- William F. Nast (1840–1893), American business manager
