= 1868 in rail transport =

This article lists events related to rail transport that occurred in 1868.

== Events ==
=== January events ===
- January 1 – Construction begins on the Colorado and Clear Creek Railroad mainline that will connect Denver to Golden, Colorado.
- January 3 – The Kalamazoo and Grand Rapids Railroad is incorporated in Michigan.
- January 14 – The Colorado and Clear Creek Railroad officially changes its name to Colorado Central Railroad.

=== February events ===
- February 12 – The Columbus and Indiana Central Railway and Chicago and Great Eastern Railway merge to form the Columbus, Chicago and Indiana Central Railway.
- February 17 – Manningham station opens on the Midland Railway north of Bradford, West Yorkshire, England.
- February 18 – The Los Angeles and San Pedro Railroad is incorporated in California.

=== April events ===
- April 3 – The Flushing and North Side Rail Road is incorporated in New York.

=== May events ===
- May 18 – The Denver Pacific Railway breaks ground on a railroad connection between Denver, Colorado, and Cheyenne, Wyoming.

=== June events ===
- June – The first edition of the Official Guide of the Railways (later known as the Official Railway Guide) is published in the United States.

=== July events ===
- July – Jay Gould succeeds John S. Eldridge as president of the Erie Railroad.
- July 1 – The cable-operated West Side and Yonkers Patent Railway, built on Greenwich Street (Manhattan) by Charles T. Harvey, becomes the first elevated railway in the United States.

=== August events ===
- August 20 – Abergele train disaster in North Wales: a London and North Western Railway Irish Mail passenger train on the Chester and Holyhead line collides with cargo trucks loaded with paraffin leaving 33 dead, the greatest toll up to this date in any British railway accident.
- August 31 – The Virginia Central Railroad and the Covington and Ohio Railroad are merged to form the Chesapeake and Ohio Railroad.

=== September events ===
- September 2 – William F. Nast succeeds Samuel C. Pomeroy as president of the Atchison, Topeka and Santa Fe Railway.
- September 10 – Romania's Gara de Nord station in Bucharest opens.
- September 24 – Henry C. Lord succeeds William F. Nast as president of the Atchison, Topeka and Santa Fe Railway.

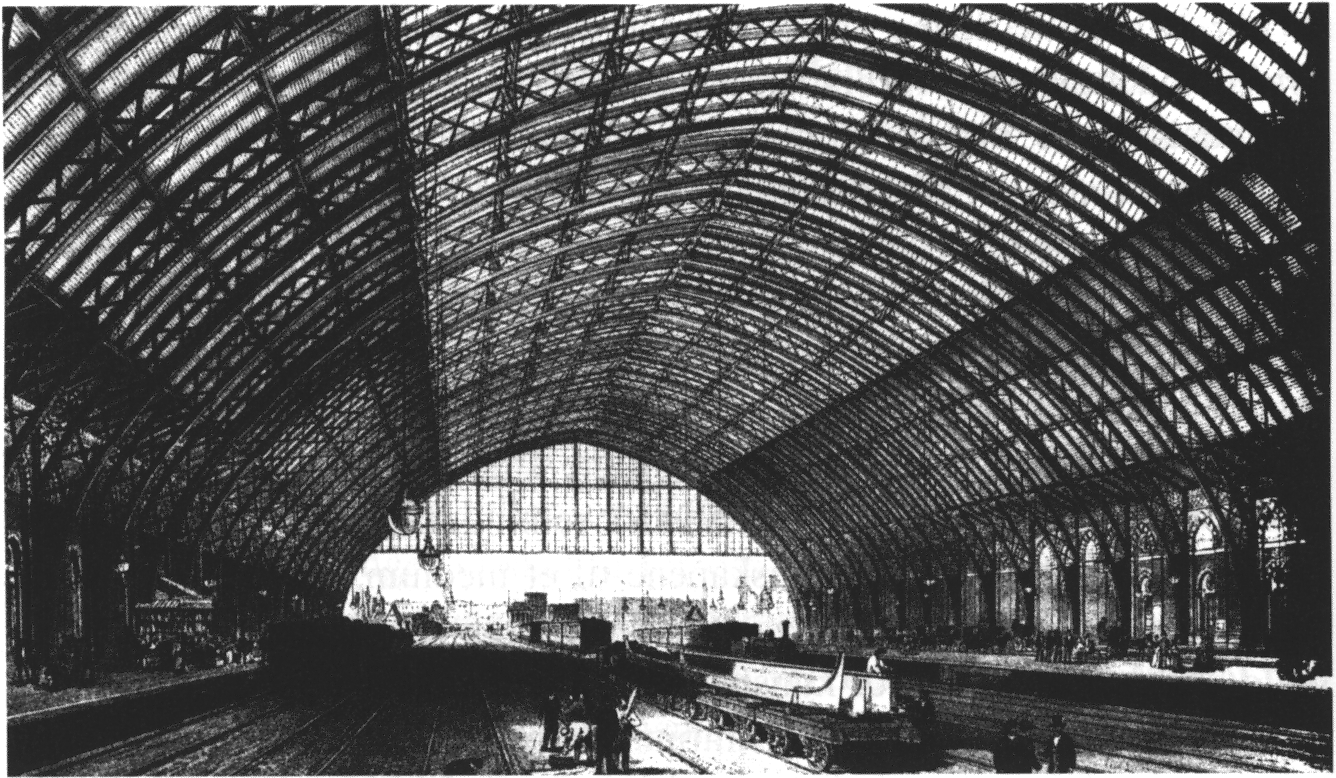
Barlow’s train shed at London St Pancras newly completed

- September 25 – The Big Four purchase the Southern Pacific Railroad.

=== October events ===
- October 1 – Opening of the Midland Railway's St Pancras station in London, England.
- October 12 – Hønefoss Station in Norway opens.
- October 26 – The Flint and Pere Marquette Railroad opens between Midland and Averill, Michigan.
- October 30 – Ground is broken in Topeka, Kansas, on the Atchison, Topeka and Santa Fe Railroad.

=== November events ===
- November 1 – Staatsspoorwegen opens Bad Nieuweschans railway station, now the easternmost station in the Netherlands, with the first train services there.

=== Unknown date events ===
- Leland Stanford succeeds Timothy Guy Phelps as President of the Southern Pacific Company, parent company of the Southern Pacific Railroad.
- Calcutta & South Eastern Railway transferred to Indian Government.
- First Meyer locomotive to the patent of Jean-Jacques Meyer, L'Avenir, is built by Cail in France.

== Births ==
=== May births ===
- May 12 – Samuel T. Bledsoe, president of Atchison, Topeka and Santa Fe Railway 1933–1939 (d. 1939).
- May 26 – Richard Edward Lloyd Maunsell, Chief mechanical engineer for the Southern Railway 1923–1937 (d. 1944).
