= Bénédicte =

- Gender: Female

Origin
- Origin: French from Latin Benedictus
- Meaning: blessed

Other names
- Related names: Benoit, Benedict

Bénédicte may refer to:

- Bénédicte Augst (born 1968), French rhythmic gymnast
- Bénédicte Couvreur, French film producer
- Bénédicte Cronier (born 1961), French bridge player
- Bénédicte Dorfman-Luzuy (born 1971), French rower
- Bénédicte Duprez (born 1951), French swimmer
- Bénédicte Kurzen (born 1980), French photographer and photojournalist
- Bénédicte Liénard (born 1965), Belgian filmmaker
- Bénédicte Paviot, French television news reporter
- Bénédicte Pesle (1927–2018), French arts patron
- Bénédicte Pételle (born 1971), French politician
- Bénédicte Peyrol (born 1991), French Allier politician
- Bénédicte de Raphélis Soissan, French entrepreneur
- Bénédicte Taurine (born 1971), French La France Insoumise politician

Benedicte may also refer to:

- a Christian prayer said on Sundays, see Canonical hours

== Other versions of the name ==
- Benedictus (disambiguation)
- Benoit
- Benedict
