= Condé Nast (disambiguation) =

Condé Nast is a major American magazine publisher. Condé Nast may also refer to:

- Condé Montrose Nast (1873–1942), founder of the publisher
- Condé Nast Building, the publisher's headquarters, in Times Square
