= Condé Nast (businessman) =

American publisher (1873–1942)

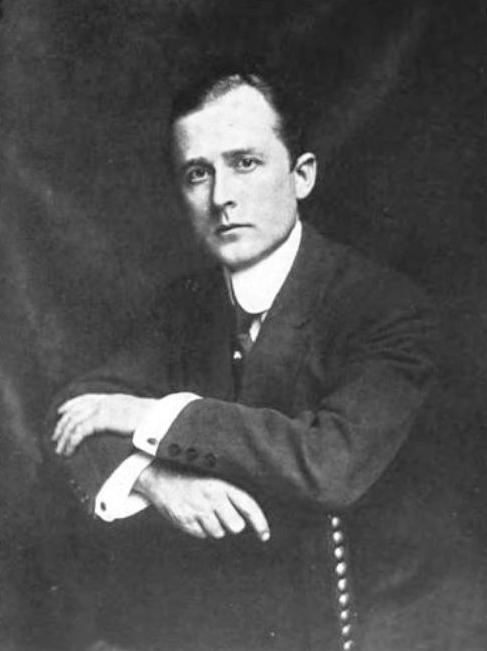
- Nast, c. 1916
- Born: Condé Montrose Nast; March 26, 1873; New York City, U.S.
- Died: September 19, 1942 (aged 69); New York City, U.S.
- Education: Georgetown University; Washington University
- Occupation: Publisher
- Spouses: Clarisse Coudert (m. 1902; div. 1925) Leslie Foster (m. 1928; div. 1932)
- Partner(s): Helen Brown Norden (1932–1936)
- Children: 3
- Parent(s): William F. Nast; Esther Benoist
- Relatives: William Nast (grandfather); Louis Auguste Benoist (grandfather); Jane Bonham Carter, Baroness Bonham-Carter of Yarnbury (granddaughter)

Condé Montrose Nast (March 26, 1873 – September 19, 1942) was an American publisher, entrepreneur and business magnate. He founded Condé Nast, a mass media company, and published titles such as Vanity Fair and Vogue.

== Early life ==
Named after his uncle Condé Benoist Pallen, Condé Montrose Nast was born in New York City to a family of Midwestern origin. His father, William F. Nast—son of the German-born Methodist leader William Nast—was an inventor who had been a U.S. attaché in Berlin. His mother, Esther A. Benoist, was a daughter of pioneering St. Louis banker Louis Auguste Benoist, a descendant of a prominent French family who emigrated to Canada, then to Missouri. He had three siblings.

Nast's aunt financed his studies at Georgetown University, from which he graduated in 1894. During his studies, he served as class president and was a member of Georgetown's debating organization, the Philodemic Society. He stayed on an extra year to receive a master's degree from Georgetown in 1895. He went on to earn a law degree from Washington University in St. Louis in 1897.

== Career ==
Nast did not take well to law and, upon graduation, took on a job working for a former Georgetown classmate, Robert Collier, as advertising manager for Collier's Weekly. Over the course of a decade, he increased the advertising revenue a hundredfold. He published books and Lippincott's Monthly Magazine with Robert M. McBride. After leaving Collier's, Nast bought Vogue, then a small New York society magazine, transforming it into one of America's premier fashion magazines.

He then changed Vanity Fair into a general-interest publication with Frank Crowninshield, who served as editor for more than 20 years. The publication featured new writers and reproductions of modern art.

Nast eventually owned a stable of magazines which included House & Garden, British, French and Argentine editions of Vogue, Le Jardin des Modes and Glamour – the last magazine added to the group while he was alive. While other publishers simply focused on increasing the number of magazines in circulation, Nast targeted groups of readers by income level or common interest. Among his staff were Edna Woolman Chase, who served as the editor-in-chief of Vogue, Dorothy Parker and Robert Benchley.

== Personal life ==
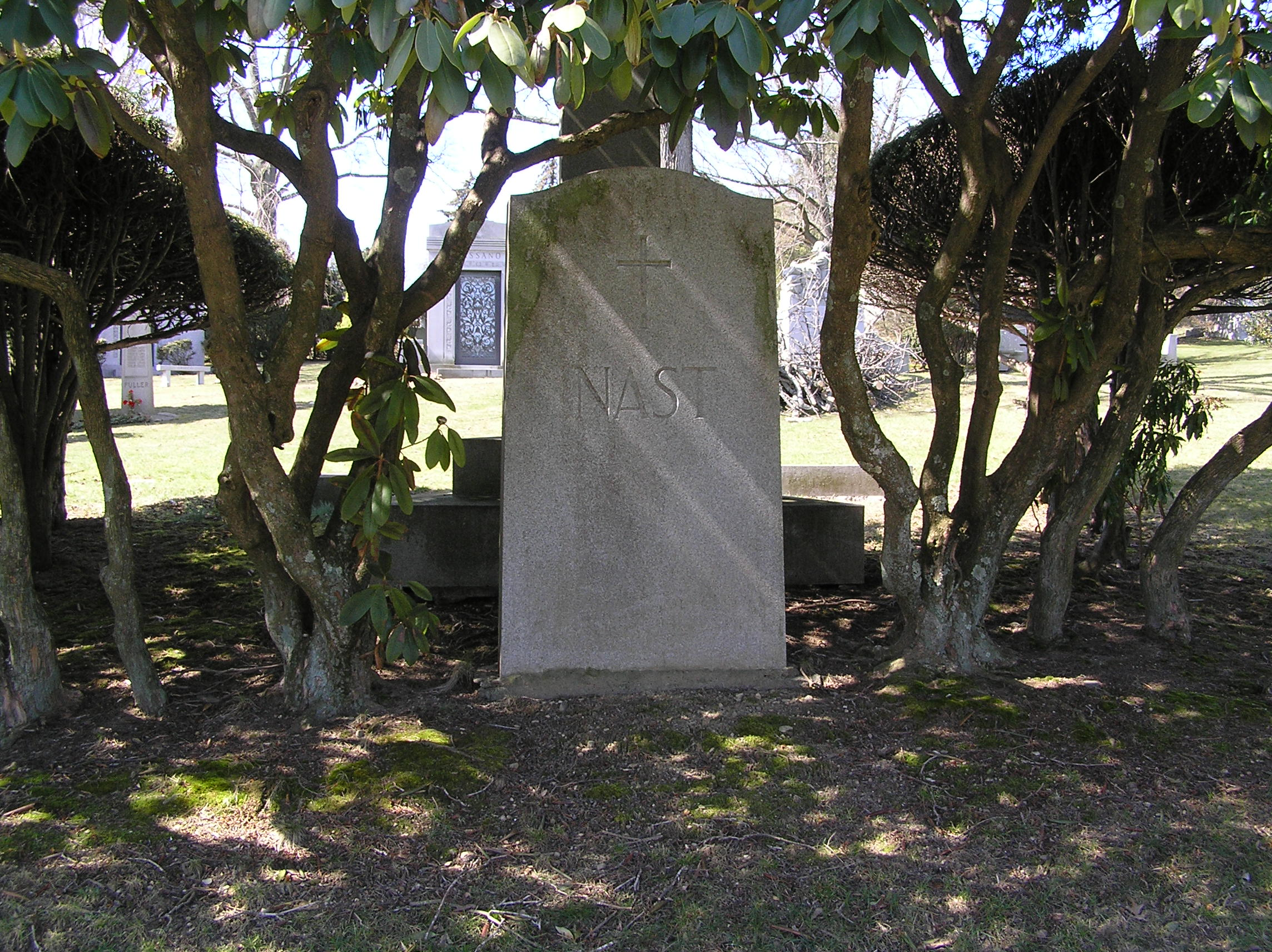
Nast's grave in Gate of Heaven Cemetery

Nast was married twice. His first wife was Clarisse Coudert, a Coudert Brothers law-firm heiress who became a set and costume designer. They married in 1902, separated in 1919 and divorced in 1925. They had two children, including Charles Coudert Nast.

His second wife was Leslie Foster, granddaughter of short-time governor of Wyoming Territory, George W. Baxter. They married in 1928 when she was 20 and he was 55 and divorced around 1932. They had one child.

Between 1932 and 1936, Nast's companion was Vanity Fair writer Helen Brown Norden.

He was nearly ruined by the Great Depression and spent his last years struggling to regain his early prosperity. Condé Nast died on September 19, 1942, and is interred at Gate of Heaven Cemetery in Hawthorne, New York. His grave is in Section 25 of the cemetery, near Babe Ruth and Billy Martin.
