= Jersey pound =

Currency of Jersey

Louis d'Jèrri (Jèrriais); Livre de Jersey (French)
Obverse of a £5 banknote
Reverse of a £5 banknote

ISO 4217
- Code: none (GBP, JEP unofficially)

Units of account
- Plural
- Symbol: £
- Subunit
- 1/100: penny
- Plural
- penny: pence
- Symbol
- penny: p

Denominations
- Banknotes
- Freq. used: £1, £5, £10, £20, £50
- Rarely used: £100
- Coins
- Freq. used: 1p, 2p, 5p, 10p, 20p, 50p, £2

Demographics
- User(s): Jersey (alongside pound sterling)

Issuance
- Treasury: Treasury and Resources Department, States of Jersey (website)

Valuation
- Inflation: 5.3%
- Source: The World Factbook, 2004
- Pegged with: pound sterling at par

The pound (French: Livre de Jersey, Jèrriais: Louis d'Jèrri; abbreviation: JEP; sign: £) is the currency of Jersey. Jersey is in currency union with the United Kingdom, and the Jersey pound is not a separate currency but is an issue of banknotes and coins by the States of Jersey denominated in sterling, in a similar way to the banknotes issued in Scotland and Northern Ireland (see Banknotes of the pound sterling). It can be exchanged at par with other sterling coinage and notes (see also sterling zone).

ISO 4217 does not include a separate currency code for the Jersey pound, the abbreviation "JEP" may be used if distinction from sterling is desired.

Both Jersey and Bank of England notes are valid and usable currency in Jersey and circulate together, alongside the Guernsey pound and Scottish banknotes. Jersey notes unlike Scottish and Northern Irish banknotes are not authorised by the British Parliament as legal currency in the United Kingdom. That said, it will often be accepted by vendors in the UK with varying degrees of difficulty.

== History ==
The livre was the currency of Jersey until 1834. It consisted of French coins which, in the early 19th century, were exchangeable for sterling at a rate of 26 livres = 1 pound. After the livre was replaced by the franc in France in 1795, the supply of coins in Jersey dwindled leading to difficulties in trade and payment. In 1834, an Order in Council adopted the pound sterling as Jersey's sole official legal tender, although French copper coins continued to circulate alongside British silver coins, with 26 sous equal to the shilling. Because the sous remained the chief small-change coins, when a new copper coinage was issued for Jersey in 1841, it was based on a penny worth 1/13 of a shilling, the equivalent of 2 sous. This system continued until 1877, when a penny of 1/12 of a shilling was introduced.

Along with the rest of the British Isles, Jersey decimalised in 1971 and began issuing a full series of circulating coins from 1/2p to 50p. £1 and £2 denominations followed later.

As of December 2005, there was £64.7m of Jersey currency in circulation. A profit of £2.8m earned on the issue of Jersey currency was received by the Treasurer of the States in 2005.

The 1981 square pound

== Coins ==
=== History ===
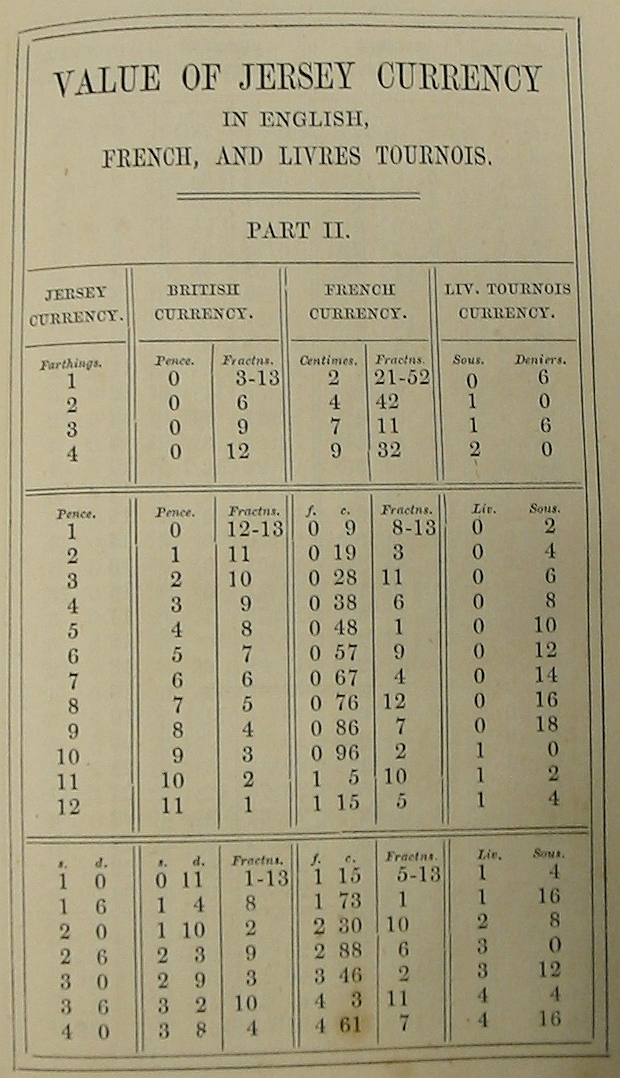
A page from a ready reckoner published in 1854 allowing at-a-glance conversion between Jersey currency and three other currencies in use at the time

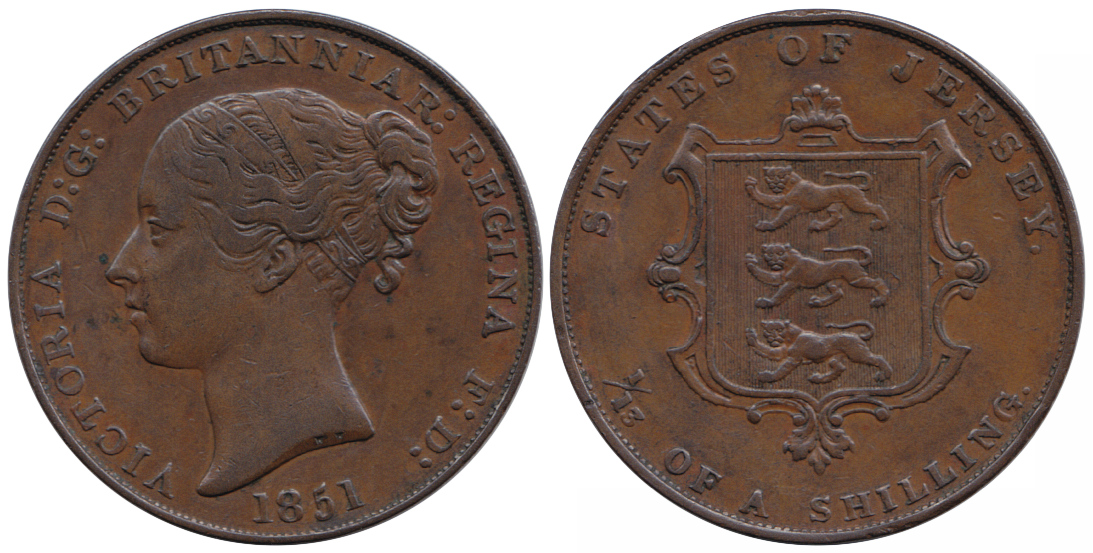
1851 States of Jersey 1/13 shilling. (KM#3, 34.10mm, Copper)

In 1834, an Order in Council adopted the pound sterling as Jersey's sole official legal tender to replace the Jersey livre, although French copper coins continued to circulate alongside British silver coins, with 26 sous equal to the shilling. Because the sous remained the chief small-change coins, when a new copper coinage was issued for Jersey in 1841, it was based on a penny worth 1/13 of a shilling, the equivalent of 2 sous. In 1841, copper 1/52, 1/26 and 1/13 shilling coins were introduced, followed by bronze 1/26 and 1/13 shilling in 1866.

In 1877 a penny of 1/12 of a shilling was introduced, and the system changed to 12 pence to the shilling. Bronze 1/48, 1/24 and 1/12 shilling were introduced. This was the only issue of the 1/48 shilling denomination. Between 1949 and 1952 the end of the German occupation of the Channel Islands was marked by one million commemorative Liberation pennies that were struck for Jersey.

In 1957, a nickel-brass 3 pence coin was introduced carrying the denomination "one fourth of a shilling". The 1957 and 1960 issues were round, with a dodecagonal version introduced in 1964.

In 1968, 5 and 10 (new) pence coins were introduced, followed by 50 pence in 1969 and 1/2p, 1p and 2 pence in 1971 when decimalisation took place. All had the same composition and size as the corresponding British coins. The reverse of the first issue of decimal coinage bore the coat of arms of Jersey as had previous coins. The 1/2 penny coin was last minted in 1981.

20 pence coins were introduced in 1982 and £2 coins in 1998.

==== £1 coin ====
A square £1 coin was issued in circulation in 1981 to mark the bicentenary of the Battle of Jersey. The square pound could not be accepted by vending machines and was not issued after 1981.

When the United Kingdom started to introduce a standardised pound coin in 1983, Jersey changed to a round coin to match. £1 coins were issued with a different design each year. Initially, each new coin featured one of the coats of arms of the 12 parishes of Jersey. These were followed by a series of coins featuring sailing ships built in the island. The motto round the milled edge of Jersey pound coins was: Caesarea Insula ("island of Jersey" in Latin).

Jersey £1 coins ceased to be legal tender in Jersey on 15 October 2017 to coincide with the withdrawal of the circular £1 coin in the UK. The UK's new 12-sided £1 coin is the only £1 coin that is legal tender in the Island.

=== Coinage ===
Designs on the reverse of Jersey coins:

- 1p Le Hocq Tower (coastal defence)
- 2p L'Hermitage, site where St. Helier lived
- 5p Seymour Tower (offshore defence)
- 10p La Pouquelaye de Faldouet (dolmen)
- 20p La Corbière Lighthouse
- 50p Grosnez Castle (ruins)

== Banknotes ==
In 1797 Hugh Godfray and Company, a wine merchant, opened Jersey's first bank (later called the Jersey Old Bank) and issued £1 notes. Due to the shortage of livre tournois coinage, individuals and companies issued a large number of low value notes until in 1813 the States laid down that notes had to have a minimum value of £1. Until 1831, a large number of bodies and individuals in Jersey issued their own banknotes. The parishes of Jersey issued notes, as did the Vingtaine de la Ville. Legislation in 1831 attempted to regulate such issues by requiring note issuers to be backed by two guarantors, but the parishes and the Vingtaine de la Ville were exempted from the regulatory provisions. Most of the notes were 1 pound denominations, although at least one 5 pound issue was made. These locally produced notes, which were often issued to fund public works, ceased to be issued after the 1890s.

During the German occupation in the Second World War, a shortage of coinage (partly caused by occupying troops taking away coins as souvenirs) led to the passing of the Currency Notes (Jersey) Law on 29 April 1941. A series of 2 shilling notes (blue lettering on orange paper) were issued. The law was amended on 29 November 1941 to provide for further issues of notes of various denominations, and a series of banknotes designed by Edmund Blampied was issued by the States of Jersey in denominations of 6 pence, 1, 2 and 10 shillings, and 1 pound. The six pence note was designed by Blampied in such a way that the wording of the word six on the reverse incorporated an outsized "X" so that when the note was folded, the result was the resistance symbol "V" for victory.

Denomination	Colour	Reverse design
6 pence	Red	wording six pence
1 shilling	Brown	silhouette of two characters in conversation
2 shillings	Blue	horse wagon
10 shillings	Green	farm girl and Jersey cattle
1 pound	Purple	vraicing scene

At Liberation in May 1945, the States stopped issuing notes.

=== 1963 issue ===
These notes were issued under the Currency Notes (Jersey) Law 1959. Designed by TDLR's John White, they feature Pietro Annigoni's portrait of Queen Elizabeth II. When the 10-pound note was issued in 1971, it featured the same image originally used on the back of the 10-shilling note of 1963, because the low-value note had been replaced by a coin.

Image	Denomination	Colour	Reverse design
	10 shillings	Brown	Saint Ouen's Manor
	1 pound	Green	Mont Orgueil
	5 pounds	Red	Saint Aubin's Fort
	10 pounds	Purple	Saint Ouen's Manor

=== 1976 issue ===
A new series of notes came into circulation on 5 August 1976. The new portrait of Queen Elizabeth II was based on a photograph by Anthony Buckley. The reverse featured historic images of Jersey, with Jersey flora forming part of the design of the obverse. The size of the notes was reduced in line with international trends. 20 pound notes were introduced in 1976.

Image	Denomination	Colour	Obverse design	Reverse design
	£1	Blue	Queen Elizabeth II; Jersey buttercup	The Death of Major Pierson, Battle of Jersey, 1781
	£5	Brown	Queen Elizabeth II; Jersey fern	Elizabeth Castle, by George Wolfe
	£10	Green	Queen Elizabeth II; wild daffodils	Victoria College, by Félix Benoist
	£20	Red	Queen Elizabeth II; burnet rose	Mont Orgueil, by Jean Le Capelain

=== 1989 issue ===
50 pound notes were introduced in 1989. The current notes depict Queen Elizabeth II on the obverse and various landmarks of Jersey or incidents in Jersey history on the reverse. The watermark is a Jersey cow. Despite the introduction of a £1 coin, the £1 note continues to circulate.

Image	Denomination	Colour	Reverse design
	1 pound	Green	St. Helier Parish Church
	5 pounds	Purple	La Corbière lighthouse
	10 pounds	Red	The Death of Major Pierson, Battle of Jersey, 1781
	20 pounds	Blue	St. Ouen's manor
	50 pounds	Brown	Government House

=== Commemorative issues ===
Jersey has issued two commemorative £1 banknotes. In 1995 a special issue commemorating the 50th anniversary of Liberation of Jersey was issued. The front side is slightly different from the standard design with the serial number starting "LJ" standing for "Liberation of Jersey" and a map of Jersey printed in optically variable ink. On the reverse is an entirely different design from the standard one pound note, featuring the one pound note issued during the Occupation of Jersey.

In 2004 a special edition £1 note was introduced in general circulation alongside the St. Helier Parish Church note; this commemorative note marks the 800th anniversary of the division of the Duchy of Normandy in 1204 and the design consequently includes Mont Orgueil castle and other historic symbols. It has serial number with prefix "J8C" which stands for "Jersey 800".

On 1 June 2012 a £100 note was issued to commemorate the Diamond Jubilee of Queen Elizabeth II. The front of the commemorative note features a portrait of The Queen based on Chris Levine's and Rob Munday's portrait of Her Majesty called "Equanimity", the engraving was created by Stephen Matthews of De La Rue. On the back of the note is the Royal Mace of Jersey and the Flag of Jersey in a vertical view.

=== 2010 issue ===
On 29 April 2010 a new set of Jersey banknotes was issued. The notes are trilingual, containing text in English, French and Jèrriais. On 1 June 2012 a £100 note was issued to commemorate the Diamond Jubilee of Queen Elizabeth II.

The obverse of the notes (£1-£50) includes a portrait of Queen Elizabeth II based on a photograph by Mark Lawrence, alongside a view of an important Jersey landmark, with text in English. On these notes the Queen is wearing the Vladimir Tiara as opposed to a crown in recognition of her title in Jersey; Duke of Normandy. The reverse of each note includes an image of one of Jersey's numerous historic coastal defence towers, built in the late 18th century, as well as a further image of cultural or landscape importance, images of the twelve parish crests, and with denomination worded in French and Jèrriais. The Jersey cow watermark is retained, and further security features include a see-through map of Jersey. On the £10, £20 and £50 a patch hologram showing a varying image of the coat of arms of Jersey and the Island of Jersey on a background pattern of La Corbière lighthouse. The new designs were publicly shown for the first time on 22 February 2010.

Denomination	Colour	Obverse design	Reverse design
1 pound	Green	Queen Elizabeth II; Liberation Sculpture in Saint Helier	Le Hocq Tower; La Hougue Bie
5 pounds	Sky blue	Queen Elizabeth II; Le Rât Cottage	Archirondel Tower; Les Augrès Manor
10 pounds	Burnt Sienna	Queen Elizabeth II; Hermitage of Saint Helier	Seymour Tower; Lalique sculpture in the Glass Church
20 pounds	Violet	Queen Elizabeth II; States Building	La Rocco Tower; States Chamber
50 pounds	Red	Queen Elizabeth II; Mont Orgueil	Tower, Ouaisné; La Marmotière, Les Écréhous
100 pounds	Purple	Queen Elizabeth II; map of Jersey and Cotentin peninsula	Royal mace of Jersey; Flag of Jersey

=== Future ===
Future Jersey banknotes may feature Charles III, who acceded to the throne following Elizabeth II's death in 2022; however, in June 2025, a decision had not yet been made on this matter, due to the existing stock of banknotes. A statement in July 2026 affirmed that there were no plans to introduce new banknotes featuring Charles III due to existing stock.

Current GBP exchange rates
From Google Finance:	AUD CAD CHF CNY EUR HKD JPY USD
From Yahoo! Finance:	AUD CAD CHF CNY EUR HKD JPY USD
From XE.com:	AUD CAD CHF CNY EUR HKD JPY USD
From OANDA:	AUD CAD CHF CNY EUR HKD JPY USD

== See also ==
- Economy of Jersey
- Sterling banknotes
- French livre
- Alderney pound
- Guernsey pound
- Manx pound
