= Benoy (disambiguation) =

Benoy is a architecture international firm.

Benoy may also refer to:

- Benoy (teip), a teip in Chechnya
- Benoy, Vedensky District, rural locality in Vedensky District, Chechnya, Russia
- Benoy, Nozhay-Yurtovsky District, Chechen Republic, rural locality and the administrative centre of Benoyskoye Rural Settlement in Nozhay-Yurtovsky District, in Chechnya, Russia

== See also ==
- Benoit (disambiguation)
