= Helen Lawrenson =

American journalist

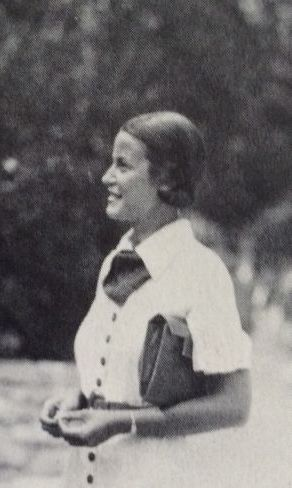
- Born: Helen Brown; October 1, 1907; La Fargeville, New York, US
- Died: April 5, 1982 (aged 74); New York City, US
- Education: Vassar College
- Occupations: Writer, editor, socialite
- Children: 2

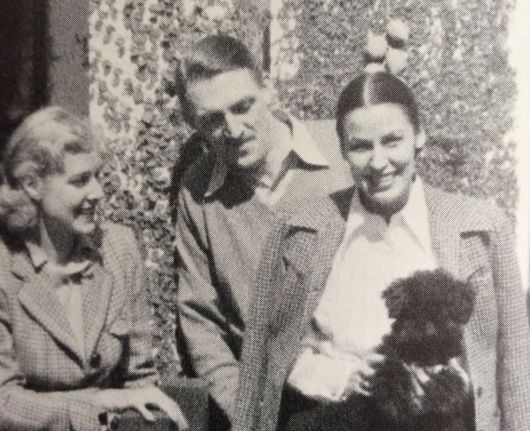
Helen and Jack Lawrenson

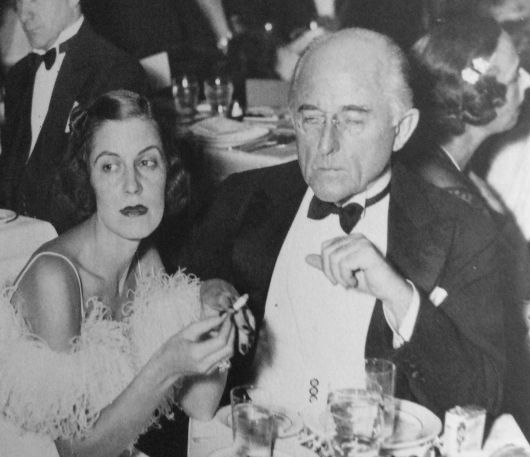
Lawrenson with Condé Nast

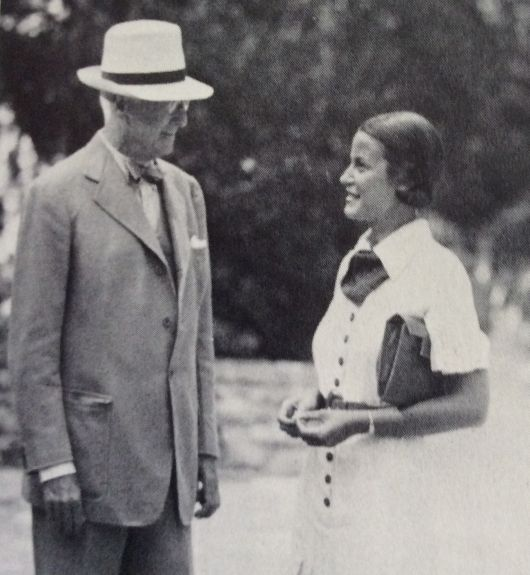
Lawrenson and Bernard Baruch

Helen Lawrenson (born Helen Strough Brown, October 1, 1907 – April 5, 1982) was an American editor, writer and socialite who gained fame in the 1930s with her acerbic descriptions of New York society. She made friends with great ease, many among the rich and famous, notably author Clare Boothe Luce and statesman Bernard Baruch.

At the height of the Great Depression, she was an editor of Vanity Fair. She later became notorious for an article called "Latins Are Lousy Lovers", published in Esquire in 1936. She also wrote profiles of Joan Crawford, Warren Beatty and Jane Fonda, among many others. She supported herself by writing articles for the rest of her life.

Lawrenson's two autobiographies, Stranger at the Party and Whistling Girl, are full of anecdotes and strong opinions – especially about New York society, politics left and right, and dense with anecdotes and vehement statements not easily corroborated.

== Early life ==
Helen was born on October 1, 1907, in La Fargeville, New York, seven miles south of the Canadian border, to Lloyd Brown and Lucy Marie Ford. She was not close to her parents. Her mother once confided to her she never wanted children, and had made several attempts to get rid of Helen as a foetus: hot mustard baths, enemas, riding horseback, and more. Helen claims to have learned to read at three; her childhood was spent in voracious reading, with few friends.

In New York City for a year at age 7, she attended the Ethical Culture school. Then she was taken under the care of her maternal grandmother, who took her to Syracuse and exposed her to much culture. She got to hear Paderewski and to see Pavlova dance and was awed, as well as various Shakespearean companies. She was largely supported by her grandmother, first at private school and then the elite Vassar College for two years.

== Career ==
Tiring of Vassar, she got jobs as a newspaper reporter in Syracuse, New York — two years on the Journal, then two years when lured away to the Herald, a Hearst paper. Lawrenson enjoyed the work greatly, and learned the trick of acting casual: "It was a matter of pride with us never to appear to be working." She interviewed, among others, Lindbergh, Admiral Byrd, Red Grange, Eleanor Roosevelt, Clarence Darrow, Al Jolson (whom she idolized). She also loved reviewing burlesque shows in New York City. "The life I managed to lead was an entertainingly dissipated caper", she once stated, adding that this included heavy drinking in speakeasies during Prohibition.

She joined Vanity Fair in the 1920s as an editor and film critic. In 1932, at the depth of the Depression, she ascended to heights of comfort and prestige in the media circles. Then, Vanity Fair maintained a frolicsome attitude as if the Depression did not exist. She described the atmosphere at the magazine as a happy one, largely because of editor Frank Crowninshield. Once a week, they were treated to a fancy lunch from the Savarin restaurant.

Lawrenson was a senior editor and film critic at Vanity Fair from 1932 to 1935 and also wrote for Vogue, Harper's Bazaar, Look, Esquire and Town & Country. Lawrenson was the first woman to write for men's magazine Esquire. There, her first article, "Latins Are Lousy Lovers" (1936), initially published anonymously, in which she ridiculed machismo as "quantity rather than quality", caused a sensation and was considered probably the "most notorious piece" in an Esquire collection from 1973. While married to her first husband, she published under the name Helen Brown Norden.

She attended lavish parties and dinners, in a high society of the rich, titled and entitled. According to Jane Fonda, once Roger Vadim asked Lawrenson "Do I look like Abraham Lincoln?" to which she replied, "All I see is a guy with big ears and a hangdog face." According to Lawrenson, Jackie Kennedy was very aware of her husband's "hundreds of women". Lawrenson wrote an uncustomarily negative article about Julie Andrews, calling her background not "compatible with reticence and timidity".

She continued to support herself precariously by writing articles the rest of her life.

=== Communist spy ===
She was recruited as a spy once, which took her into danger in South America.

At Communist party headquarters on East 13th street, in 1938, she was given a spying assignment by a Venezuelan she knew only as "Ricky". Ricky told her to find out about canals in Chile, which had been used by the Germans in World War I. The trip was well publicized (her cover story was to write travel articles), but her experience was harrowing because of her own initiatives. Some of these initiatives nearly got her killed. In every city she tried to meet left-wing politicians. She was more than once fired upon in crowds, closely escaping death at least once. Her comments on American ambassadors in South America are scathing.

== Personal life and death ==
Lawrenson did not shy away from seedier places. During Prohibition she found that when the speakeasies were closed, whorehouses kept serving liquor. She was associated with men such as Bernard Baruch, Rabbi Wise, and Condé Nast.

She married three times. The third marriage resulted in a son, Kevin, and a daughter, Johanna. A long-time social movement organizer, Johanna Lawrenson lived on the run from the FBI with her partner, activist Abbie Hoffman. Her husbands were author and activist Heinz Norden (m. 1931, div. 1932), Venezuelan diplomat Louis López-Méndez (m. 1935, div. 1935) and finally union organizer Jack Lawrenson (co-founder of the National Maritime Union), her true love (m. 1940 until his death in November 1957). She had met Lawrenson in 1938. Their life was fraught with danger: "On one of our first dates he took me to a waterfront saloon that was the hangout of the shipowners' agents who had been offered money to kill or maim him. Several of the goons were there and the atmosphere was electric with tension and menace. Blissfully unaware of the cause, I had a wonderful time. I suppose the only reason we emerged unscathed was because Joe Kay, a seaman friend who accompanied us, although admittedly frightened, had the wit to tell the bartender that I was a member of District Attorney Dewey's staff, and the word was passed around."

According to Lawrenson, her husband was written out of the histories of the union by Joseph Curran, the "vicious and undeserving winner" "who corrupted the union Jack built", and repeatedly tried to kill him. (Both Lawrenson and Curran had earlier been members of the Communist party, but Curran pretended not to have been.)

In her later life, she lived modestly, having to keep writing to support herself. She had repeatedly turned down marriage offers from Condé Nast, who remained an ally and friend until the end of his life.

Lawrenson, 74, died on April 5, 1982, apparently following a heart-attack, after failing to show up for lunch with longtime agent Roz Cole and representatives of the Simon & Schuster publishing house. At the time, she was finishing up her first novel, Dance of Scorpions, which was published posthumously later that year.

== Bibliography ==
=== Novels ===
- Lawrenson, Helen (1982). Dance of scorpions.

=== Memoirs ===
- Lawrenson, Helen. Stranger at the party.
- —. Whistling girl.

=== Essays and reporting ===
- Lawrenson, Helen (1936). "Latins are lousy lovers". Esquire.
- — (1953). "What has become of the old-fashioned man?". In Birmingham, Frederic A. (ed.). The girls from Esquire. London: Arthur Barker. pp. 154–160.
- Lawrenson, Helen (1968). Latins Are Still Lousy Lovers. New York: Hawthorn Books.
