= Foreign Press Association =

Organization for foreign journalists in London

- Formation: 1888
- Headquarters: 8 St James's Square London SW1Y 4JU
- Members: c.500
- Director: Deborah Bonetti
- President: Vasil Hristov
- Website: https://www.fpalondon.org/

The Foreign Press Association (FPA) is a not-for-profit Friendly Society established in 1888. It organises press briefings and events for international journalists based in the United Kingdom.

Members also have access to networking events, briefings on the Royal Family and can apply to attend the parliament press gallery.

== History ==
The FPA was founded in 1888 and is the oldest and biggest association of foreign correspondents in the world. It was originally founded by international journalists who came to London to cover the Jack the Ripper case.

The organization has around 500 full members, representing around 300 media outlets from roughly 60 countries around the world.

== Membership ==
=== Eligibility ===
Members can either be full members or associate members. Full members must derive 75% of their income from journalism and must demonstrably work for international media, while associate members can be non-journalists. The latter option is intended for PR professionals and press attaches. Membership is £250 for either class of membership.

=== Press cards ===
The FPA is recognised as a press card gatekeeper by the official UK Press Card authority. Press cards in the UK grant the holder access to certain events and locations, including courtrooms and police press conferences. Around 1500 journalists are accredited by the FPA every year.

== Leadership ==
=== Director ===
- 2007–2017: Christopher Wyld
- 2018–present: Deborah Bonetti

=== President ===
- 1888–1892: T. Johnson, France
- 1893–1896: Heinrich Pollak, Austria
- 1896–1911: Gabriel de Wesselitsky, Russia, Novoye Vremya
- 1911–1919:Joseph Louis Condurier de Chassaigne, France, Le Figaro
- 1919–1921: Charles Sauerwein, France
- 1921–1924: Jacques de Marsillac, France
- 1924–1927: J.C. Van Der Veer, Netherlands
- 1927–1934: Eric Sweden, Sweden
- 1934–1936: Jean Massip, France
- 1936–1938: Stefan Litauer, Poland
- 1938–1940: Adalbert de Segonzac
- 1941–1943: Gottfried Keller, Switzerland
- 1943–1945: Andrew Rothstein, Russia
- 1945–1947: Dr Hans W. Egli, Switzerland
- 1947–1952: Gottfried Keller, Switzerland
- 1952–1954: Dr Hans W Egli, Switzerland
- 1954–1955: Adalbert de Segonzac, France
- 1955–1956: Hedvig Thorburn-MacFarlane, Sweden (the first woman President of the FPA)
- 1956–1958: Richard Jokel, Netherlands
- 1958–1959: Eric Mettler, Switzerland
- 1959–1961: Claude Veillet-Lavallee, France, France-Soir
- 1961–1962: C.J. Van Sluys, Netherlands
- 1962–1964: Nasim Ahmed, Pakistan, Al-Jamhour Al-Jadid
- 1964–1966: Hans Benirschke, Germany
- 1966–1967: Paul Möller, Denmark
- 1967–1969: Basile Tesselin, France
- 1969–1971: Henry Gustav Alexander, Germany
- 1971–1973: Henri A. Van Der Zee, Netherlands
- 1973–1974: Sam Plattner, Switzerland
- 1974–1976: W. Kornacki, Poland
- 1976–1977: Francis Devred, France
- 1977–1979: Fritz Beer, Germany
- 1979–1980: Erik Arni, Finland
- 1980–1982: Claus Toksvig, Denmark
- 1982–1984: Syed M. Mustafa, Pakistan
- 1984–1985: Robert Darroch, Australia
- 1985–1987: Roland Hill (journalist) Germany
- 1987–1989: Ali Bahaijoub, Morocco
- 1989–1991: Reiner Gatermann, Germany
- 1991–1993: Patricia L. Layman, USA
- 1993–1995: Mustapha Karkouti, Syria
- 1995–1997: Barbara Kollmeyer, Germany
- 1999–2000: Tomohiko Taniguchi, Japan
- 2000–2002: Tine Van Houts, Netherlands
- 2002–2003: Philippe Le Corre, France
- 2003–2005: Catherine Mayer, USA
- 2005–2007 Annalisa Piras, Italy
- 2007–2009: Nazenin Ansari, UK-Iran
- 2009–2011: Hosny Emam, Egypt
- 2011–2013: Jurgen Kronig, Germany
- 2014–2016: Paola Totaro, Australia
- 2016–2018: Deborah Bonetti, Italy
- 2018–2020: Bénédicte Paviot
- 2020–2022: Kate McCure, Australian Media
- 2022–2023: Daniel Faitaua, New Zealand
- 2023–2025: Dagmar Seeland, Stern Magazine, Germany
- 2025–present: Vasil Hristov, Bulgaria

== The Foreign Press Association Media Awards ==
The FPA also hosts an annual award ceremony to celebrate global excellence in journalism. Entries are accepted from both United Kingdom and international media outlets. The official site bills the awards as the "Oscars of Journalism."

Categories include:

- TV News Story of the Year
- Print & Web Story of the Year
- Environment & Science Story of the Year
- Arts & Culture Story of the Year
- Radio & Podcast Story of the Year

There are also two categories reserved for FPA members for stories about the United Kingdom in print and web, and in TV and radio respectively.

Past keynote speakers at the ceremony have included:

- Queen Camilla
- Queen Rania of Jordan
- Chief Minister of Gibraltar, Fabian Picardo
- Senator Mario Monti, former prime minister of Italy
- King Felipe VI (then Prince of Asturias)
- King Charles III (then Prince of Wales)

== See also ==
- Hollywood Foreign Press Association
