= Helier =

6th-century ascetic hermit

Saint Helier
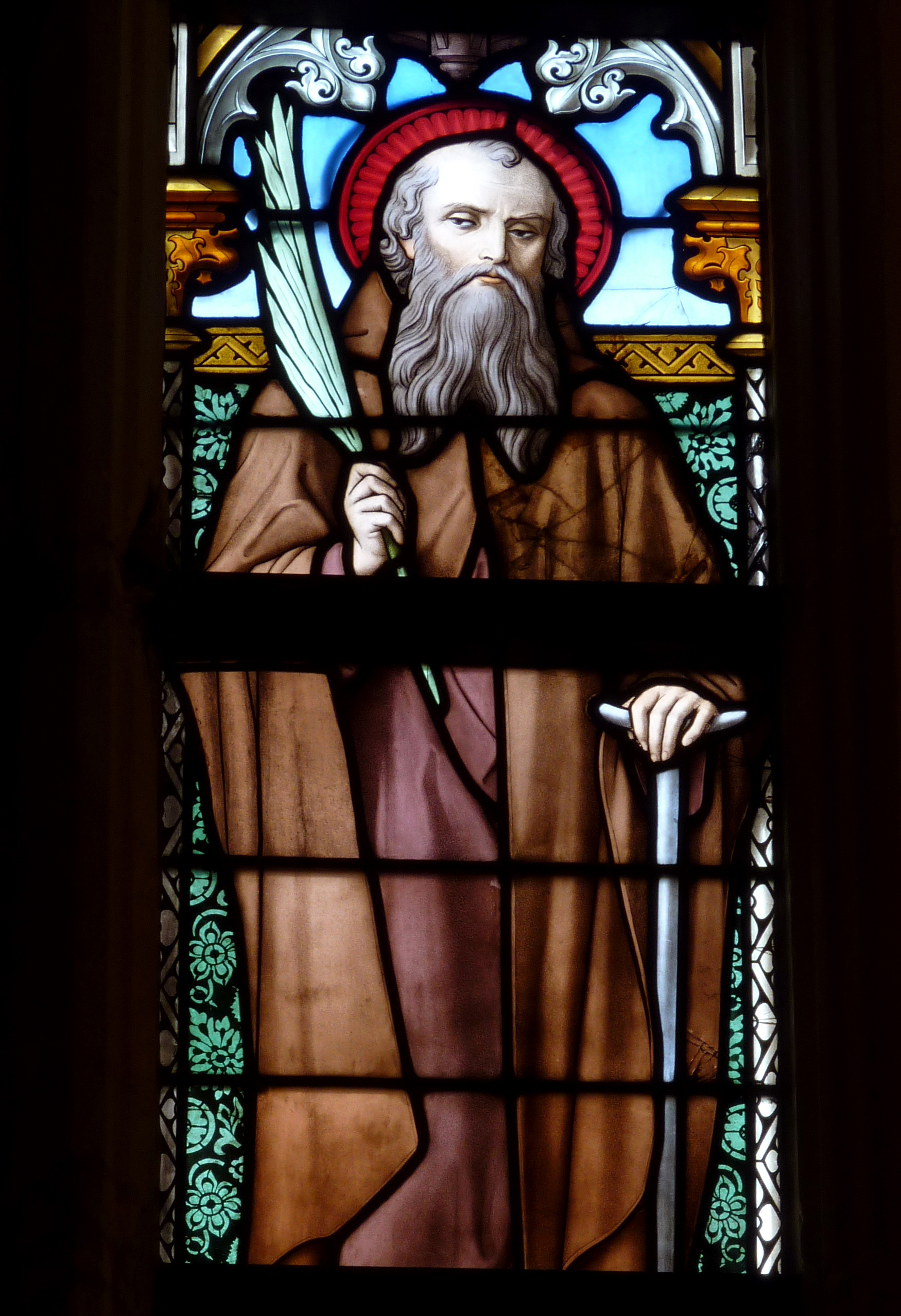
- Stained glass icon of Saint Helier in the Basilica of Our Lady, Tongeren
- Born: date unknown Tongeren (now in Belgium)
- Died: 555
- Venerated in: Eastern Orthodox Church; Roman Catholic Church; Anglican Church
- Feast: 16 July

Helier (died 555) was a 6th-century ascetic hermit. He is the patron saint of Jersey in the Channel Islands, and in particular of the town and parish of Saint Helier, the island's capital. He is also invoked as a healing saint for diseases of the skin and eyes.

== Legend ==
=== Early years ===
Hellerius or Helier was born to pagan parents in Tongeren (now in Belgium). His father was Sigebert, a nobleman from Tongeren and his mother was Lusigard. Having had difficulties conceiving a child, they turned to a Christian teacher named Cunibert, who advised them to pray to God and that when they had a child they must hand him over to God, and that he, Cunibert, would bring him up in the Christian faith. Their prayers having been answered, Helier was born, but Helier's father, the Frankish governor of that place, eventually grew angry at the influence Cunibert exerted over his precocious son, who was already causing consternation with his youthful miracles. Helier's father had Cunibert killed, whereupon Helier fled.

Helier's wanderings led him to the Cotentin where he sought retreat from the distractions of the world in the monastic community of Marculf at Nantus (Nanteuil, now St.-Marcouf-de-l'Isle in Manche).

=== Jersey ===
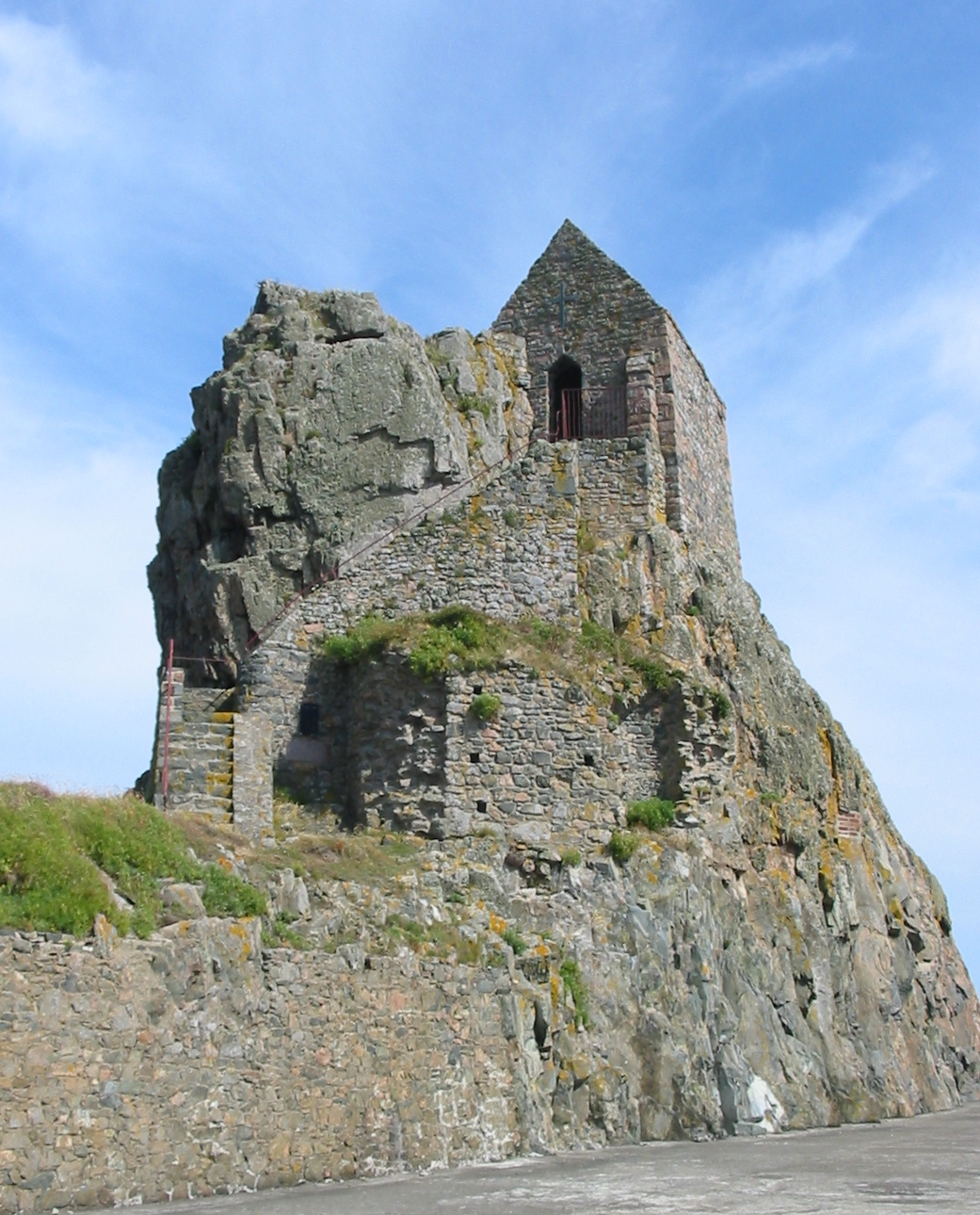
A medieval chapel was constructed over "St. Helier's Bed", the hollow in the rock where Helier sheltered. The Hermitage rock is the focus of the annual pilgrimage

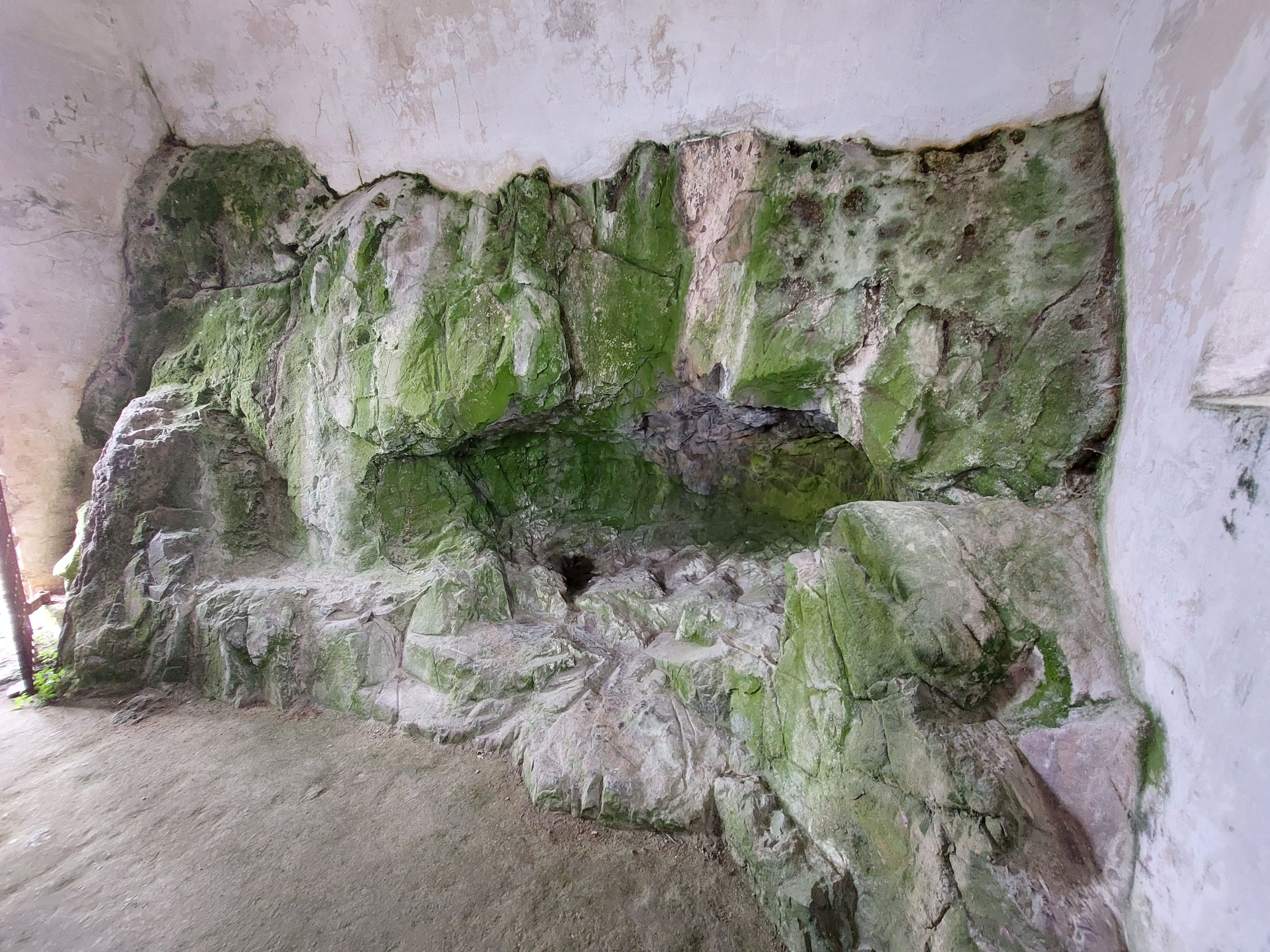
St. Helier's Bed inside the chapel

Helier, however, found the monastic community did not provide the quiet he required to devote himself fully to a life of contemplation. Marculf had received pleas from the few inhabitants of the island called Gersut, or Agna, now called Jersey, which was all but depopulated due to repeated attacks by pirates. The inhabitants requested someone to help them, and bring the gospel to them as they had no shepherd to guide them.

Marculf sent Helier and a companion, Romard, to Jersey where he found a small community of fishermen on the sand dunes where the modern town of St Helier was to develop. Helier settled on a tidal islet, nowadays known as the Hermitage Rock, next to L'Islet, the tidal island now occupied by the 16th century Elizabeth Castle. Romard would travel back and forth between the hermitage on this rock and the fishing village.

From his vantage point on his rock, Helier could see the sails of approaching attackers and would signal to the shore, whereupon the inhabitants would scatter into the surrounding marshes, thereby frustrating the attackers' bloodlust. Small dark clouds on the horizon are still known in Jèrriais as les vailes dé St. Hélyi (the sails of St. Helier).

Helier remained at his hermitage in fasting and prayer for about fifteen years. The story is that around 555 he was martyred by marauding pirates who beheaded him with an axe – hence the crossed axes on the parish crest.

=== Miracles ===
Helier is recorded as performing one healing miracle in Jersey, curing a lame man named Anquetil.

Once while Marculf was visiting, a band of raiders arrived. They prayed and made the sign of the cross and a great storm arose that destroyed the raiders ships.

Though Helier starved himself to ascetic weakness, legend holds that he had the strength, when he was beheaded by attackers, to pick up his head and walk to shore. According to the hagiography, Romard discovered Helier's body on the beach still clutching his head in his hands, placed it in a boat and set off for the mainland. The boat, guided by the hand of God, arrived at Bréville-sur-Mer where a reputedly miraculous healing spring arose on the spot where Helier's body rested overnight. A church was founded next to the spring, which is now topped by a statue and still attracts those seeking a cure.

== Veneration ==
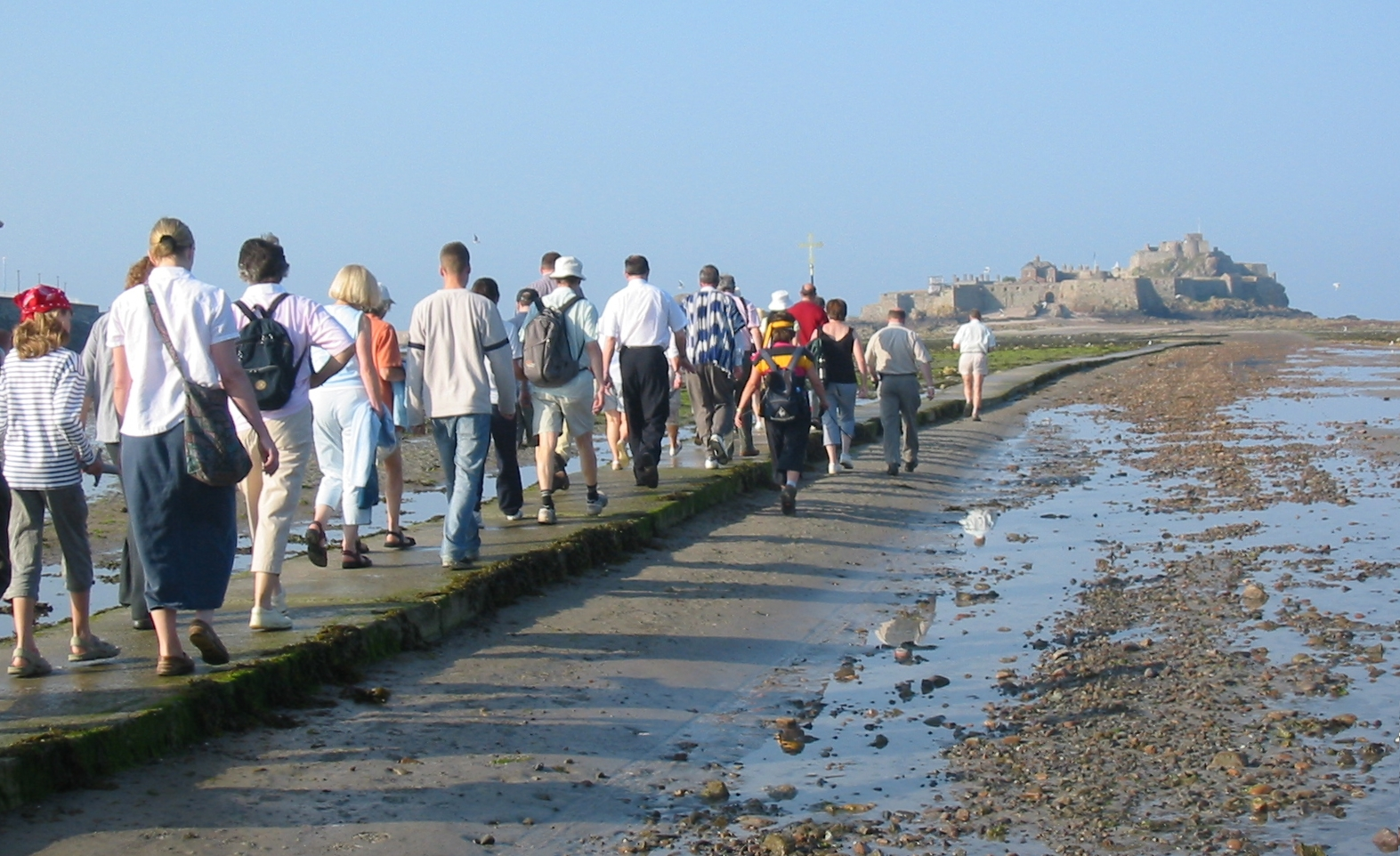
In 2005, the tides necessitated an early morning start to the pilgrimage.

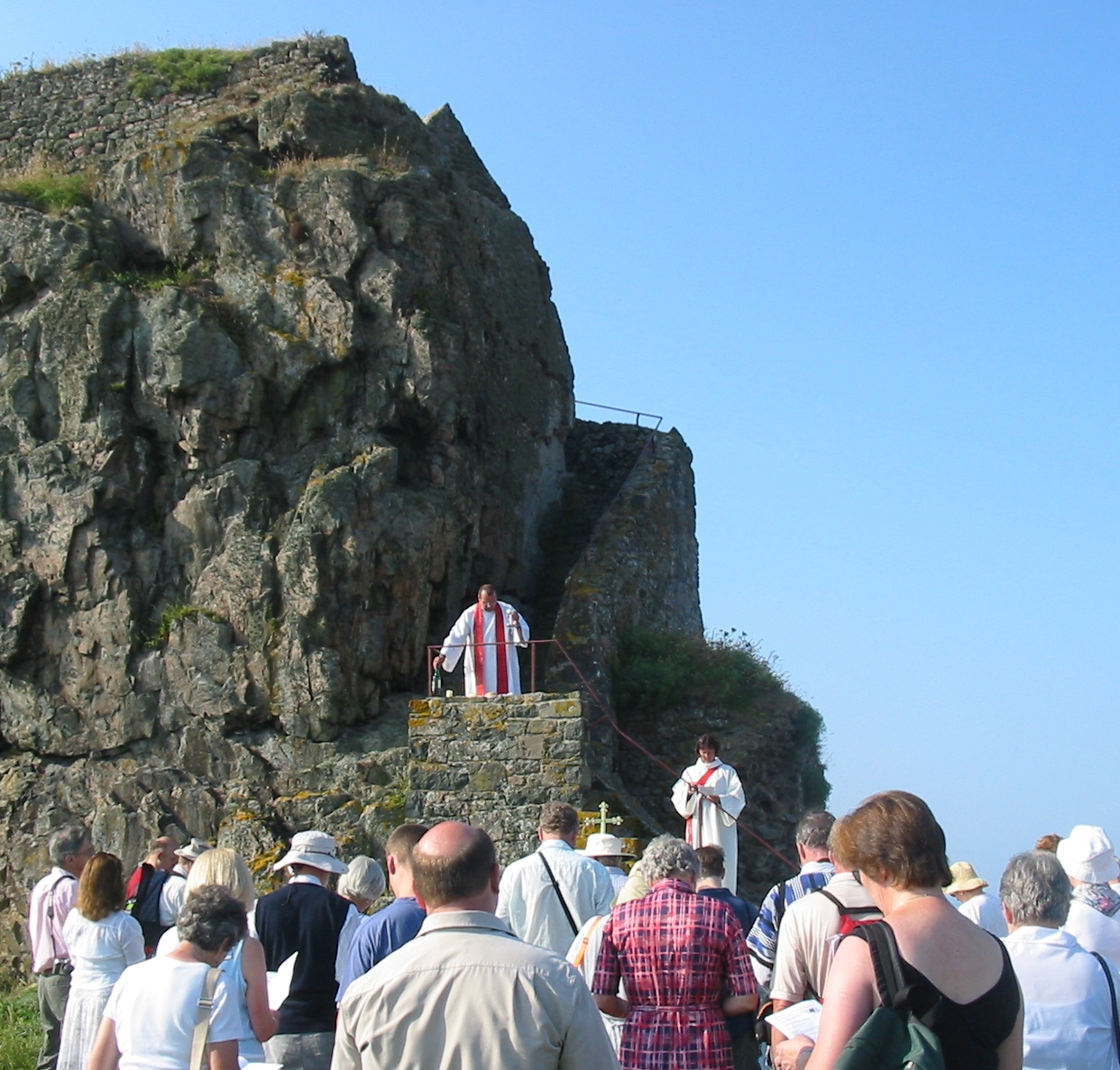
Helier pilgrimage eucharist 2005

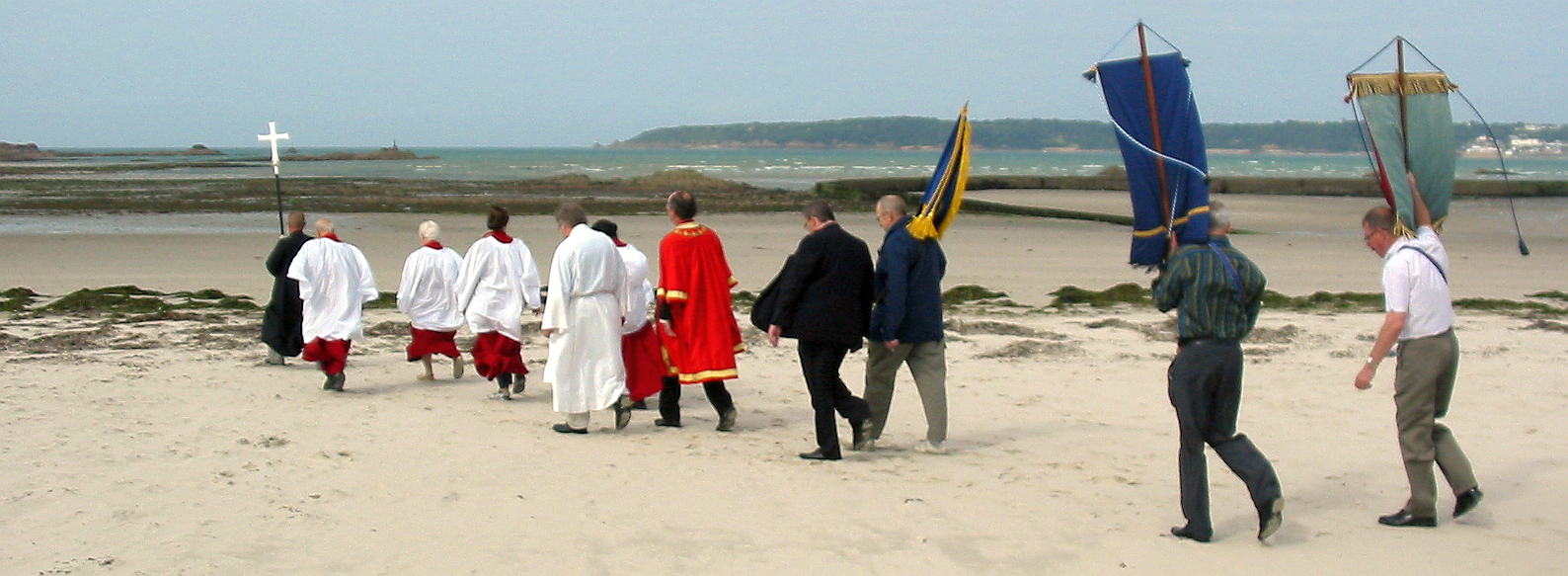
Pilgrimage in 2009.

Marculf founded an abbey on L'Islet not far from Helier's hermitage and named it for his pupil. It was later visited by Samson of Dol.

Churches dedicated to Helier can be found in Rennes, St. Helier, Beuzeville (Eure), Amécourt (Eure), Barentin (Seine-Maritime), Monhoudou (Sarthe). Evidence of veneration of the saint can be found in La Hague in the Cotentin at Querqueville and also at Omonville-la-Rogue where a 13th-century mural in the church of St. John the Baptist links Helier with Thomas Becket.

Helier is remembered in Jersey for having brought Christianity to the island, but is better known in Normandy and Brittany as a healing saint. Besides the healing springs at St. Hellier and Bréville, there is also a healing spring at Saint-Jouan-des-Guérets (Ille-et-Vilaine), where Helier's name has been deformed by folk etymology to St. Délier (délier meaning to untie in French, which may refer to the power to loosen the bonds of illness). There is also a chapel of St. Helier in the cathedral of Trenton, New Jersey.

The traditional year of his martyrdom is AD 555. His feast day, marked in Jersey by an annual municipal and ecumenical pilgrimage to the Hermitage, is on July 16. The Hermitage is depicted on the Jersey 2 pence coin and on the 2010 issue Jersey £10 note.

In 1870 Hermitage Rock was joined to L'Islet (Elizabeth Castle) by a breakwater.

=== Relics ===
Helier's relics were sent to the abbey of Bellus-Beccus at Beaubec-la-Rosière (Seine-Maritime)) where they remained until the destruction of the abbey during the French Revolution.

== Commentary ==
The Life of Saint Helier was written in, or after the 10th century.

G.R. Balleine was critical of the Passion of St. Helier, noting that "its chronology is absurd. St. Helier was born, we are told, 'after the death of wicked Queen Brunehild, when Childebert governed the Francs'. This must be Childebert III, who came to the throne in 693. But Helier became a disciple of St. Marculf, who died in 558; and 'according to one account he was buried by the famous eighth century Bishop Willebrod.' In other words he was baptised 150 years before he was born, and buried, while still a young man, two hundred years later."

Charles Grosset notes that the Passion of St. Helier, written in the 10th or 11th century, draws upon two very much earlier lives of Marculf (A and B), and amends them to suit the narrative. Grosset's conclusion is that the life of Helier is extremely poorly documented, and like Balleine, he considers it largely fictional. He sees the writer as having "been given the task of writing a life of the hermit Helier, who lived in Jersey and has a few bare facts known about him: the cave where he lived, healing of the sick, and death at the hands of pirates. He discovered a similar sounding name to Helier in the district of Tongres, and also a hermit called Eletus in the Life of St. Marcouf. He did not hesitate to identify Helier with the near namesake in Tongres, or to make an identification with Eletus, taking the story of a miracle set on an island whose place-name was not to be found on the map."

According to A.M. Bellows, the oldest Life of St. Marculf mentions an island called Agna with only thirty inhabitants and a hermit called Eletus. This has been identified with Jersey and Helier, but this is largely a reading back into the story the identifications made in the Passion of St. Helier, a much later work. In Bellows's opinion that Jersey could have so few inhabitants (thirty) at the time compared to Guernsey, in the much better documented visits of Sampson, stretches credulity too far. If a Channel Island is chosen, one the size of Herm would be more suitable.

That there was a town given the name "St. Helier" is not by itself proof that Helier existed, or, if he did exist, visited Jersey. The original attribution might have been to Hilary of Poitiers, and became corrupted over time, particularly during the Dark Ages, when the Diocese of Dol was laid waste by invasions of pagans. However, the hermitage rock and linked Priory on the Islet of Elizabeth Castle have a long history. There would certainly seem to be enough evidence to support the idea of a hermit, and later, an eremitic community which gradually evolved.

Further, the Passion of St. Helier was written at a much later date, when the original attributions had been masked by time; it is clearly a work which draws upon any available sources of other saints for stories, and it is this Life that makes the identification of Marculf's Eletus with Helier.

== Sources ==
- A Biographical Dictionary of Jersey, G. R. Balleine
- A Theory on the Evangelisation of the Cotentin (Normandy Peninsula): St Marculf, M. Charles Grosset
- Elizabeth Castle by Major N. V. L. Rybot
