= Benoit (disambiguation) =

Benoît is a French surname and given name. Benoit may also refer to:

== Places in the United States ==
- Benoit, Alabama, an unincorporated community
- Benoit, Minnesota, an unincorporated community
- Benoit, Mississippi, a town
- Benoit, Texas, an unincorporated community
- Benoit, Wisconsin, an unincorporated community

== Other uses ==
- Benoit (book), 2007 book about professional wrestler Chris Benoit

== See also ==
- Bénédicte (disambiguation)
- Benoy (disambiguation)
