= Jersey livre =

Obsolete currency of the island of Jersey

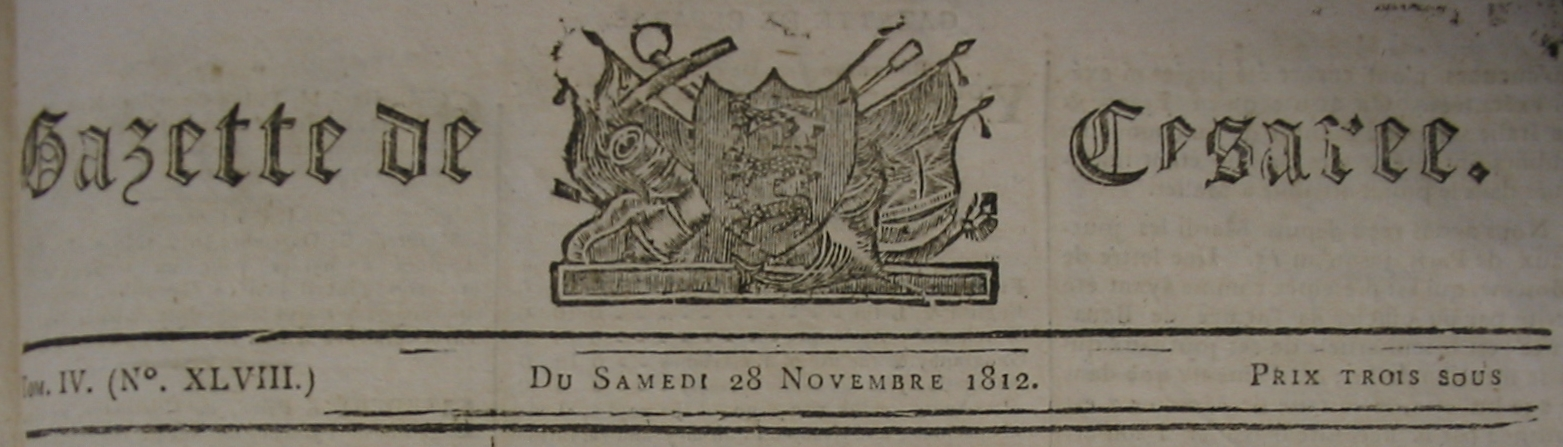
The Jersey newspaper Gazette de Césarée was priced at 3 sous in 1812

The livre was currency of Jersey until 1834. It consisted entirely of French coins.

Until the 1720s, the currency used was the French livre, subdivided into 20 sous, each of 12 deniers. The commonest coin in circulation was the liard (3 deniers or ¼ of a sou). However, the copper coinage had devalued against silver and by the 1720s liards were being exchanged in St Malo at a rate of 6 to the sou. The consequent cross-border financial speculation caused by the discrepancy in coinage values was threatening economic stability. The States of Jersey therefore resolved to devalue the liard to 6 to the sou. The legislation to that effect implemented in 1729 caused popular riots that shook the establishment. The devaluation was therefore cancelled and the liard remained officially at 4 to the sou until 1834 (and liard remains the Jèrriais word for a farthing).

The Code des Lois of 1771 codified the value of the livre against sterling in order to regulate the exchange of sterling paid to the British garrison and the currency used by the population. The exchange rate was set at 24 livres = 1 pound, making the 2 sous coin equal to a British penny. However, in the early 19th century, an exchange rate of 26 livres = 1 pound was established.

In the French Revolutionary period, the livre was replaced by the franc. The last coins and notes of the livre currency system were issued in France in the Year II of the Republic (1794).

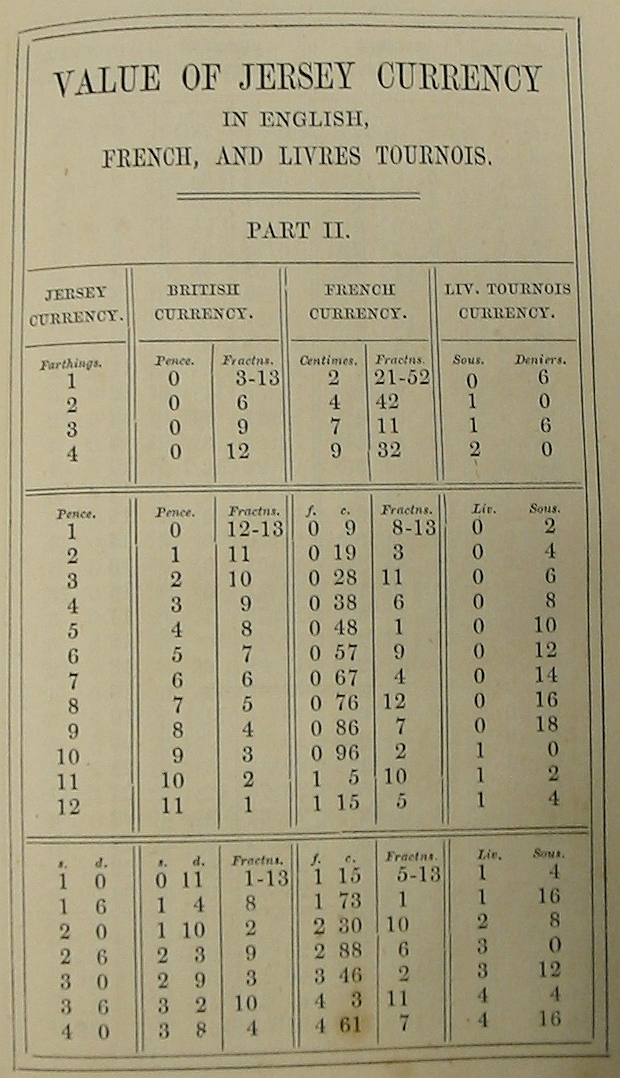
A page from a ready reckoner published in 1854 shows that conversions between Jersey currency, sterling and livres were still being carried out at that time

By the 1830s, the surviving livre coinage was in very short supply in Jersey and so worn as to be unusable. The States passed a law on 18 September 1834 that sterling would be sole legal tender as from 1 October 1834 (this law was confirmed by Order in Council on 24 June 1835). However, although sterling was henceforth the sole legal tender, French coinage continued to circulate in Jersey. In 1840, a new copper coinage was introduced for Jersey, based on a penny worth 1/13 of a shilling in sterling coin, the equivalent of 2 sous.

Nonetheless, some French coins continued to circulate (increasingly French francs). On 7 February 1923 the States passed a law to ban the import of foreign copper coinage in sums exceeding 20 sous. This law was confirmed by Order in Council on 12 March 1923 and registered in the Royal Court on 7 April 1923. The States then proceeded to take steps to remove French copper coinage from circulation.

On 2 August 1923 the States authorised the Finance Committee to acquire Jersey copper coins from their owners in exchange for French copper coins. Between 27 August and 8 September the Treasury carried out at their office the exchange of 1 and 2 sous French coins for Jersey coins and placed advertisements in the press to that effect, with an additional reminder that French coinage was still not legal tender.

== See also ==
- Economy of Jersey
- Jersey pound
- French livre
