= Beaubec-la-Rosière =

- Commune
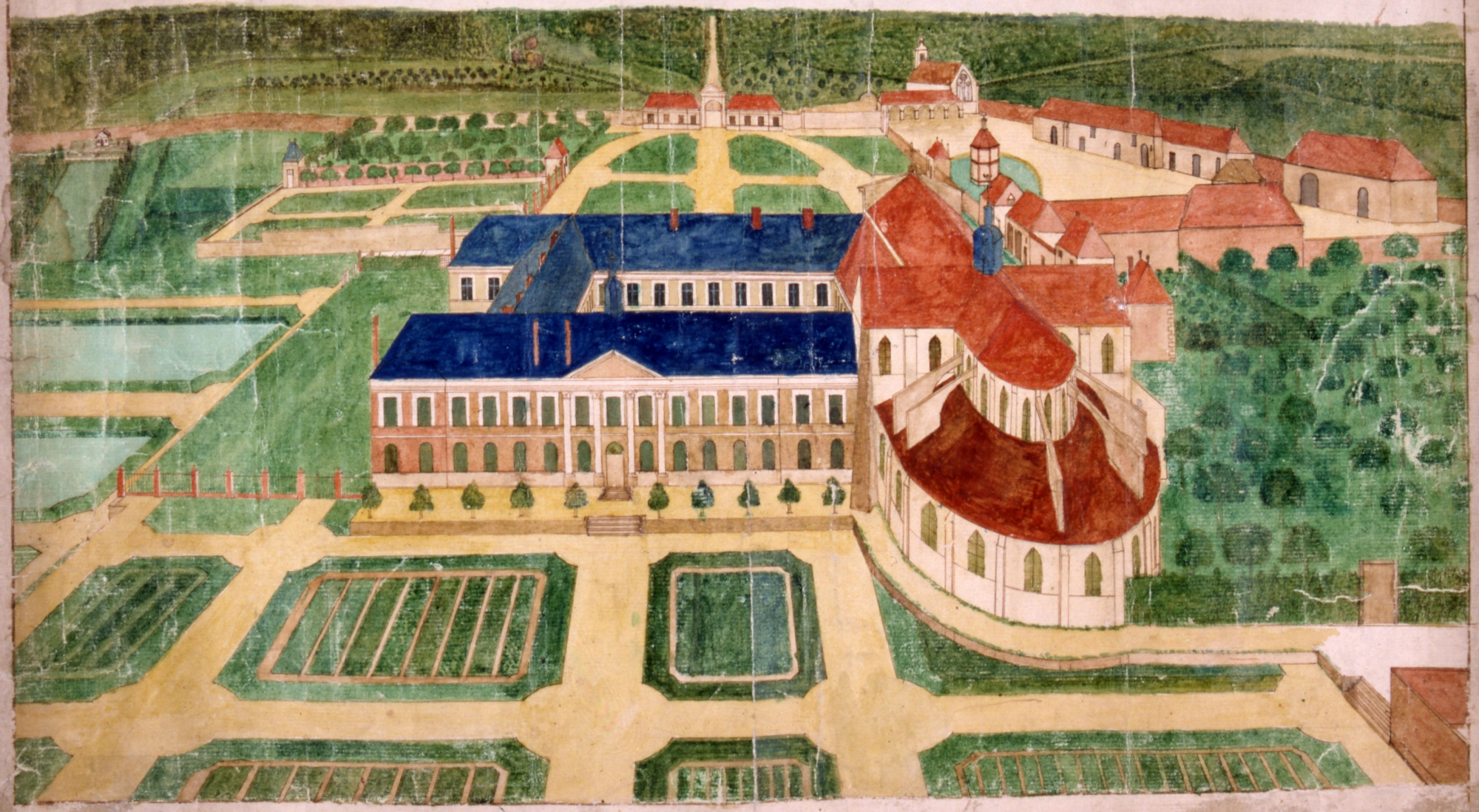
- A view of the Abbey of Beaubec-la-Rosière, around 1750

- Coat of arms
- Location of Beaubec-la-Rosière
- Location within France Location within Normandy
- Coordinates: 49°38′47″N 1°31′52″E
- Country: France
- Region: Normandy
- Department: Seine-Maritime
- Arrondissement: Dieppe
- Canton: Gournay-en-Bray
- Intercommunality: CC 4 rivières

Government
  - Mayor (2020–2026): Roger Décarnelle
- Area^{1}: 12.97 km^{2} (5.01 sq mi)
- Elevation: 158 m (518 ft)
- Highest elevation: 201 m (659 ft)
- Lowest elevation: 108 m (354 ft)
- Population (2023): 457
  - Density: 35.2/km^{2} (91.3/sq mi)
- Time zone: UTC+01:00 (CET)
  - Summer (DST): UTC+02:00 (CEST)
- INSEE/Postal code: 76060 /76440
- ^{1} French Land Register data, which excludes lakes, ponds, glaciers > 1 km^{2} (0.386 sq mi or 247 acres) and river estuaries.

Beaubec-la-Rosière (French pronunciation: [bobɛk la ʁozjɛʁ]) is a commune in the Seine-Maritime department in the Normandy region in northern France.

== Geography ==
A forestry and farming village in the Pays de Bray, situated some 35 miles (56 km) southeast of Dieppe, at the junction of the D35 and D1314 roads.

== History ==
Formed by the merger in 1825 of Beaubec-la-Ville, whose original Scandinavian name means ‘’beautiful stream’’ and La Rosière which owes its name to the many reeds of the wetlands. The rivers Epte and Andelle have their source nearby. Founded in 1127 by Hughes de Gournay, the abbey of Bellus-Beccus housed the relics of St Helier, martyred in Jersey in the 6th century. The abbey was destroyed by fire in 1383 and partially rebuilt in the 15th and 18th century. The abbey was looted, sold and demolished during the French Revolution. All that remains are the chapel of St. Ursula and a few traces of the infirmary, the farm and dependencies.

== Population ==
Historical population
Year	Pop.	±% p.a.
1968	466	—
1975	361	−3.58%
1982	328	−1.36%
1990	312	−0.62%
1999	394	+2.63%
2007	454	+1.79%
2012	485	+1.33%
2017	498	+0.53%
2023	457	−1.42%
Source: INSEE

== Places of interest ==
- Traces of a motte at Mont Grippon.
- The ruins of the ancient abbey.
- A thirteenth-century stone cross, 5m in height.
- The church of the Holy Trinity, dating from the nineteenth century.
- A thirteenth-century chapel.
- The church of La Rosière, dating from the thirteenth century.

== See also ==
- Communes of the Seine-Maritime department
