= Pierre Benoit =

Pierre Benoit may refer to:

- Pierre Benoît (architect) (1794–1852), French scientist and architect who relocated to Argentina
- Pierre Benoit (novelist) (1886–1962), novelist and member of the Académie française
- Pierre-Basile Benoit (1837–1910), member of the Canadian House of Commons
- Pierre Benoit (MLA) (1824–1870), member of the Legislative Assembly of Quebec
- Pierre Benoit (theologian) (1906–1987), Dominican priest, theologian and archaeologist in Jerusalem
- Pierre Benoit (Ontario politician) (born 1939), former mayor of Ottawa
- Pierre Benoit (Malecite) (died 1786), Malecite Indian who was murdered by settlers in York County, New Brunswick
- Pierre L. G. Benoit (1920–1995), Belgian arachnologist and entomologist.
