= French livre =

French currency from 781 to 1794

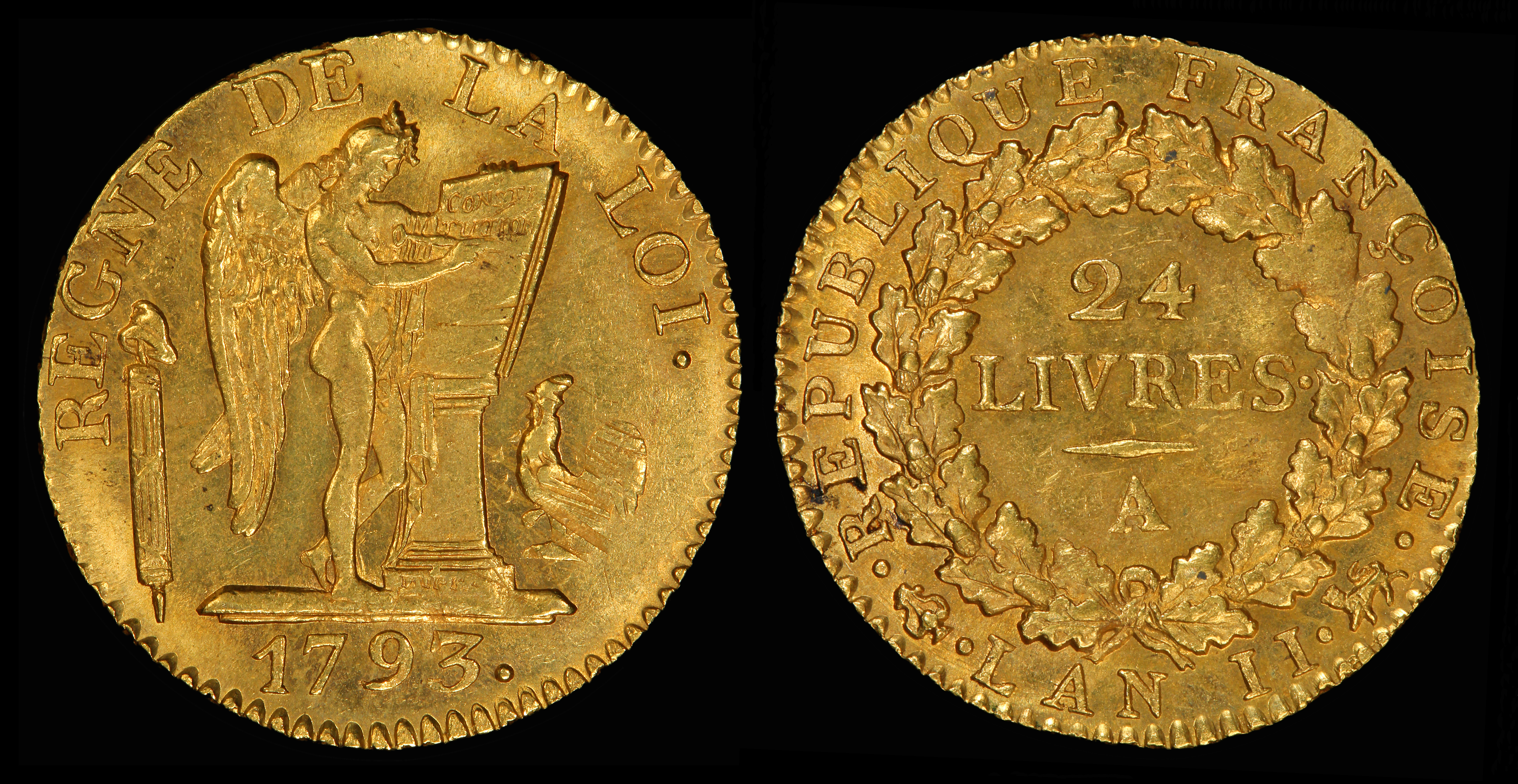
French 1793 24₶. gold coin of 7.64 grams

The livre (abbreviation: £ or ₶., French for libra (pound)) was the currency of Kingdom of France and its predecessor states of Francia and West Francia from 781 to 1794. Several different livres existed, some concurrently. The livre was the name of coins and of units of account.

== History ==
=== Origin and etymology ===
The livre was established by Charlemagne as a unit of account equal to one pound of silver. It was subdivided into 20 sous (also sols), each sou equalling 12 deniers. The word livre came from the Latin word libra, a Roman unit of weight and still the name of a pound in modern French, and the denier comes from the Roman denarius. This system and the denier itself served as the model for many of Europe's currencies, including the British pound, Italian lira, Spanish dinero and the Portuguese dinheiro.

This first livre is known as the livre carolingienne. Only deniers were initially minted, but debasement led to larger denominations being issued. Different mints in different regions used different weights for the denier, leading to several distinct livres of different values.

"Livre" is homophonous to the French word for "book" (from the Latin word liber), the distinction being that the two have different genders. The monetary and weight unit is feminine, la/une livre, while "book" is masculine, le/un livre.

=== Late medieval and early modern period ===
₶o

Livre tournois
- In Unicode: U+20B6 ₶ LIVRE TOURNOIS SIGN

For much of the Middle Ages, different duchies of France were semi-autonomous if not practically independent from the weak Capetian kings, and thus each minted its own currency. Charters would need to specify which region or mint was being used: "money of Paris" or "money of Troyes". The first steps towards standardization came under the first strong Capetian monarch, Philip II Augustus (1165–1223). Philip II conquered much of the continental Angevin Empire from King John of England, including Normandy, Anjou, and Touraine.

The currency minted at the city of Tours in Touraine was considered very stable, and Philip II decided to adopt the livre tournois as the standard currency of his lands, gradually replacing even the livre of Paris, and ultimately the currencies of all French-speaking areas he controlled. This was a slow process lasting many decades and not completed within Philip II's lifetime.

The result was that from 1200 onwards, following the beginning of King Philip II's campaigns against King John, the currency used within French speaking lands was in a state of flux, as the livre tournois was gradually introduced into other areas.

Until the thirteenth century and onwards, only deniers were actually minted as coin money. Both livres and sous did not actually exist as coins but were used only for accounting purposes.

Upon his return from the crusades in the 1250s, Louis IX instigated a royal monopoly on the minting of coinage in France and minted the first gold écu d'or and silver gros d'argent, whose weights (and thus monetary divisions) were roughly equivalent to the livre tournois and the denier.

Between 1360 and 1641, coins worth 1₶. were minted known as francs. This name persisted in common parlance for 1₶. but was not used on coins or paper money.

The official use of the livre tournois accounting unit in all contracts in France was legislated in 1549. However, in 1577, the livre tournois accounting unit was officially abolished and replaced by the écu, which was at that time the major French gold coin in actual circulation. In 1602, the livre tournois accounting unit was brought back.

=== Seventeenth century ===
Louis XIII stopped minting the franc in 1641, replacing it with coins based on the silver écu and gold Louis d'or. The écu and louis d'or fluctuated in value, with the écu varying between three and six livres tournois until 1726 when it was fixed at 6₶. The louis was initially (1640) worth 10₶., and fluctuated too, until its value was fixed at 24₶. in 1726.

In 1667, the livre parisis was officially abolished. However, the sole remaining livre was still frequently referred to as the livre tournois until its demise.

=== Eighteenth century ===
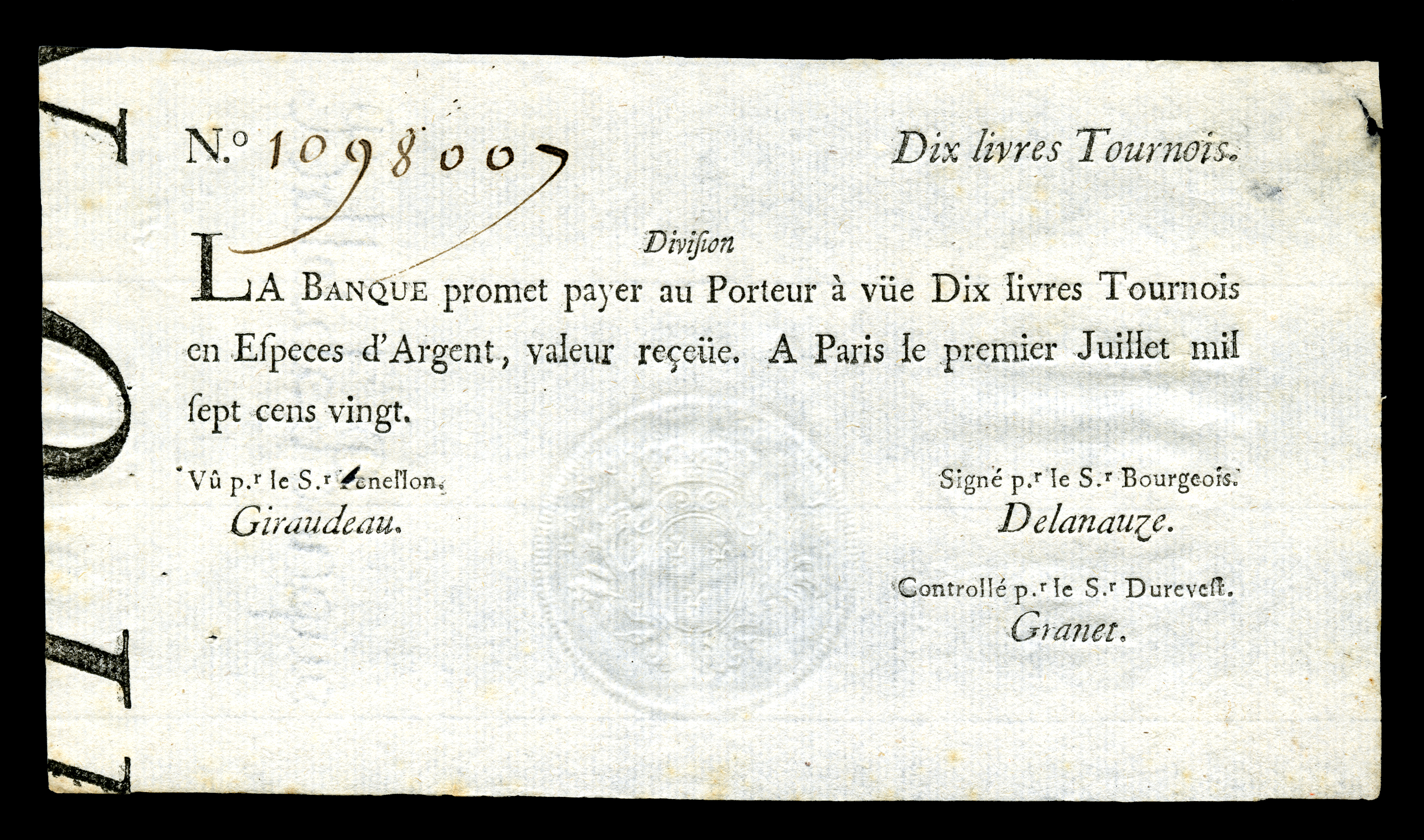
10₶. note issued by La Banque Royale (1720)

The first French paper money was issued in 1701 and was denominated in livres tournois. However, the notes did not hold their value relative to silver due to massive over–production. The Banque Royale (the last issuer of these early notes) crashed in 1720, rendering the banknotes worthless (see John Law for more on this system).

In 1726, under Louis XV's minister Cardinal Fleury, a system of monetary stability was put in place. Eight Troy ounces (a mark, or about 250 grams) of gold was worth 740₶.9s. (so, one Troy ounce of gold was worth approximately 4 Louis or 93₶.); 8 Troy ounces of silver was worth 51₶.2s.3d. This led to a strict conversion rate between gold and silver (14.4867 to 1) and established the values of the coins in circulation in France at:

- the double Louis d'or (gold coin) of 48₶.
- the Louis d'or (gold coin) of 24₶.
- the demi-Louis d'or or half-Louis (gold coin) of 12₶.
- the écu (silver coin) of 6₶. or 120 sous, along with 1/2, 1/4 and 1/8 écu denominations valued at 60, 30 and 15 sous
- the sou (copper coin) denominated in 1 and 2 sou units valued at 1/20₶. (or 12 deniers) per sou
- the denier (copper coin) denominated in 3 and 6 denier units valued at 1/4 and 1/2 sou respectively (the three denier coin was also called a liard).

However a coin of 1₶. was not minted. Yet in 1720 a special coin minted in pure silver was produced and assigned a token value of 1₶. Additionally, France took Navarrese 20-sou coins minted in 1719 and 1720, re-struck them as 1/6 écu (between the years of 1720 and 1723) essentially creating a coin worth 1 livre. These re-struck coins, however, eventually were assigned the value of 18 sous.

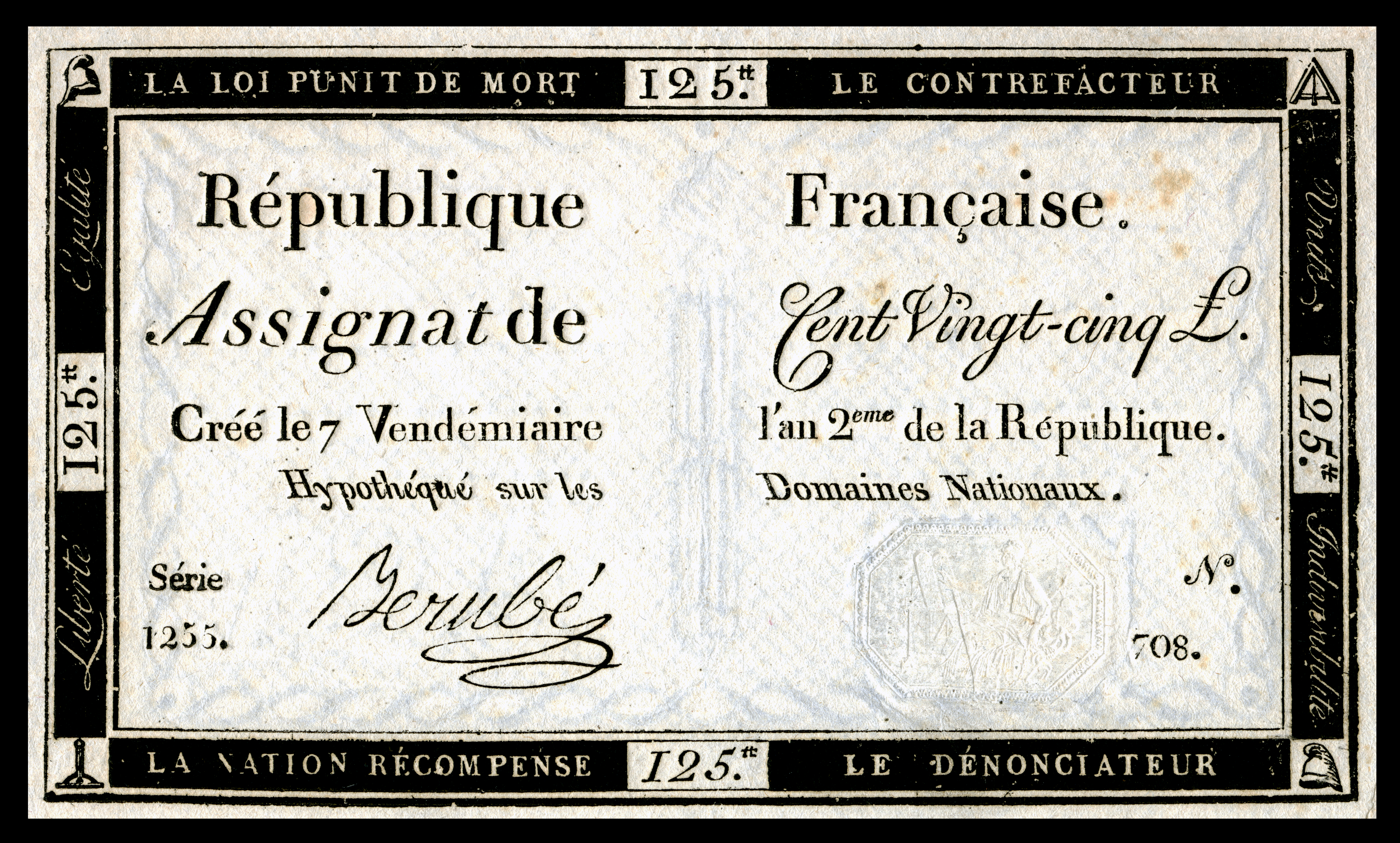
Assignat for 125₶. (1793)

A kind of paper money was reintroduced by the Caisse d'Escompte in 1776 as actions au porteur, denominated in livres. These were issued until 1793, alongside assignats from 1789. Assignats were backed (in theory) by government-held land. Like the issues of the Banque Royale, their value plummeted.

The last coins and notes of the livre currency system were issued in Year II of the Republic (1794). In 1795, the franc was introduced, worth 1₶.3d. (1 1/80₶), and the first one-franc coin was struck in 1803. Still the word livre survived; until the middle of the 19th century it was indifferently used alongside the word franc, especially to express large amounts and transactions linked with property (real estate, property incomes or "rentes", cattle, etc...).

=== Later history ===
The livre had also been used as the legal currency of the Channel Islands. The Jersey livre remained legal currency in Jersey until 1834 when dwindling supplies of no-longer minted coins obliged the adoption of the pound as legal tender.

Today and after two centuries of using the franc, France uses the euro as its currency.
