= Benoist (tea) =

British-style tea marketed in Japan

- Headquarters: Tokyo, Japan
- Website: benoist.co.jp

Benoist is a type of British-style tea marketed in Japan. The brand was greatly popularised by the Japanese book (largely a compilation of the original 2channel threads in which the eponymous poster presented his situation) and subsequent movie Densha Otoko, where sales reportedly tripled as a result of being featured in the movie. The drama (presenting information from a 2channel posting included in the book) claimed that Benoist is the only tea company to hold a set of three Royal Warrants, specifically by the Queen, the Prince of Wales, and the Queen Mother. However, there is no evidence to support this claim, and a search of the Royal Warrant Holders Association website reveals this to actually be true of R. Twining & Co.
