= Kelly Benoit-Bird =

Marine scientist

Kelly J. Benoit-Bird
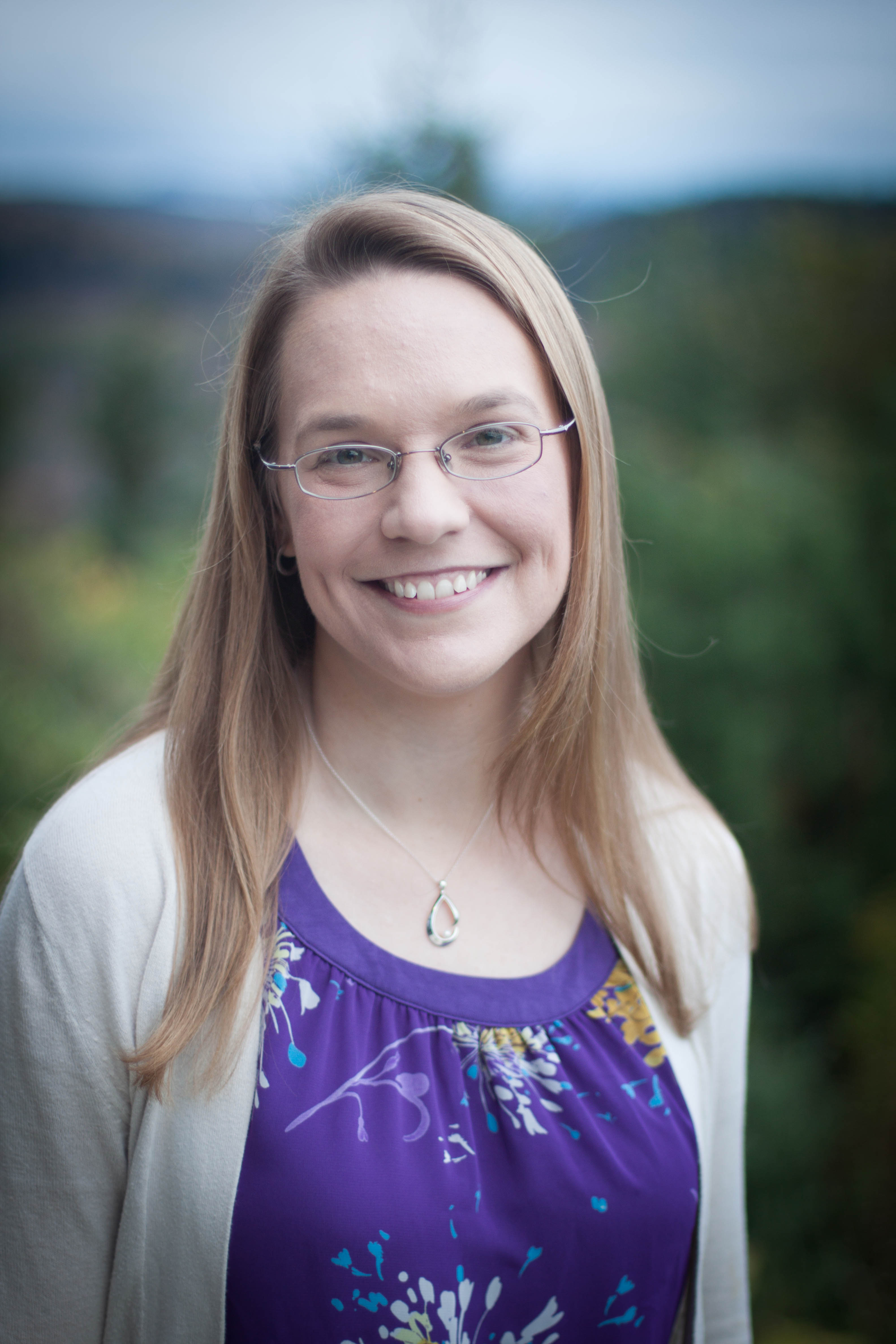
- Born: 1976 (age 49–50)
- Education: Brown University (BS); University of Hawaii at Manoa (PhD)
- Awards: 2010 MacArthur Fellowship
- Scientific career
- Thesis: Dynamics of the Hawai'ian mesopelagic boundary community and their effects on predator foraging behavior (2003)
- Website: www.mbari.org/benoit-bird-kelly//

Kelly Benoit-Bird (born 1976) is a marine scientist and senior scientist at the Monterey Bay Aquarium Research Institute. Benoit-Bird uses acoustics to study marine organisms and was named a MacArthur Fellow in 2010.

== Work and discoveries ==
Benoit-Bird has been fascinated by the ocean since fourth grade, and is the first in her family to attend college. She earned her B.S. from Brown University and her Ph.D. from the University of Hawai‘i, later completing a postdoctoral fellowship at the Hawai‘i Institute of Marine Biology, where she advanced the use of active acoustics (sonar) to study animal behavior and spatial patterns in marine ecosystems.

Benoit-Bird's research uses acoustical tools to study the interactions between predators and their prey in marine environments. Key linkages characterized in the lab's research include simultaneous tracking of predator-prey pairs such as northern fur seals and their prey juvenile pollock, spinner dolphins and micronekton, fish and zooplankton in thin layers in Monterey Bay, and beaked whales and squid. Benoit-Bird's research has also used acoustic measurements to examine how changes in the phase of the moon impact the migration of small marine organisms and the ability of predators such as spinner and dusky dolphins to find their prey. In research conducted off California, Brandon Southall and Benoit-Bird determined that beaked whales prefer to forage within a Navy test range due to the high density of prey available to the peaked whales in that region. In a study co-published in 2025, she proposed reasons for the drastic decrease of observed whale singing, associating it with the decrease in population of krill caused by extreme heat. Benoit-Bird has also developed instrumentation to make acoustic measurements with submersibles and autonomous vehicles.

=== Awards ===
- 2025: ASLO 2025 Sustaining Fellow, Monterey Bay Aquarium Research Institute
- 2020: Medwin Prize in Acoustical Oceanography, Acoustical Society of America (ASA)
- 2017: Fellow, Acoustical Society of America
- 2007, 2013: Kavli Frontiers Fellowship, United States National Academy of Sciences
- 2010: MacArthur Genius Award.
- 2009: R. Bruce Lindsay Award, for contributions in marine ecological acoustics, Acoustical Society of America
- 2008: Ocean Sciences Early Career Award, American Geophysical Union
- 2005: Presidential Early Career Award for Scientists and Engineers
