= Henry C. Lord =

American railroad executive (1824 – 1884)

- Born: October 2, 1824
- Died: March 23, 1884 (aged 59); Riverside, Ohio
- Occupation: railroad executive
- Spouse: Eliza Burret Wright
- Parent: Nathan Lord

Henry Clark Lord (October 2, 1824 – March 23, 1884) was the fourth president of the Atchison, Topeka and Santa Fe Railway. He was born in Amherst, Massachusetts, the son of Dartmouth College president Nathan Lord.

In 1837, Henry enrolled at Dartmouth. He graduated in 1843 and began working as a tutor in Virginia. After studying law, he was admitted to the Suffolk Bar in Boston.

He married Eliza Burret Wright of Cincinnati, and he moved there in the 1850s. In Ohio, Lord developed a reputation as a rehabilitator of railroad lines. In the 1850s, he served as president of the Indianapolis and Cincinnati Railroad. He succeeded William F. Nast as president of the Atchison, Topeka and Santa Fe Railway on September 24, 1868.

In August 1873, Henry Lord became the founding president of the Belt Railroad of Indianapolis.

Although he was not a member, Henry Lord was a strong supporter of the Brotherhood of Locomotive Engineers and a frequent contributor to the labor union's monthly journal. In November 1883, he developed throat cancer. Henry Lord died at his home in Riverside, Ohio, on March 23, 1884.

Business positions
Preceded by William F. Nast	President of the Atchison, Topeka and Santa Fe Railway; 1868 – 1869	Succeeded by Henry Keyes
