= Jacques Benoit (biologist) =

French biologist (1896–1982)

- Born: 26 February 1896; Nancy, France
- Died: 1 December 1982 (aged 86); Neuilly-sur-Seine, France
- Known for: Fundamental physiological mechanisms in reproductive biology, photobiology and neuroendocrinology
- Scientific career
- Fields: Medicine, biology, neuroendocrinology
- Workplaces: Collège de France

Jacques Marie Benoit (February 26, 1896 - December 1, 1982) was a French physician, biologist and neuroendocrinologist. He was a professor at the Collège de France and is considered one of the pioneers of neuroendocrinology and photobiology.

== Biography ==
Jacques Benoit was born on February 26, 1896, in Nancy. He was the grandson of Charles Benoit (1815–1898), Dean of the Faculty of Literature in Nancy.

Robert Courrier was a fellow student while studying medicine. In 1925 he became a doctor of medicine He received his doctorate in science in 1929.

He died on December 1, 1982, in Neuilly-sur-Seine.

== Research ==
His research led him to the discovery of fundamental physiological mechanisms in reproductive biology, photobiology and neuroendocrinology:

== Publications (selection) ==
- Sur les cellules interstitielles du testicule du coq domestique : évolution et structure, Paris, Masson, 1922.
- Transformation expérimentale du sexe par ovariotomie précoce chez la poule domestique J Benoit - CR Acad. Sci, 1923
- L'inversion expérimentale du sexe chez la poule déterminée par l'ablation de l'ovaire gauche, In: Archives de zoologie expérimentale et générale, 1932, 73, S. 1–112,
- Démonstration de l'inversion expérimentale du sexe chez la poule, In: Revue suisse de zoologie, 1932.
- L'Ovaire, organe élaborateur des hormones sexuelles femelles. Les hormones sexuelles chez les intersexués, Paris, Hermann, 1935.
- Le testicule, organe élaborateur de l'hormone sexuelle mâle, Paris, Hermann, 1935.
- Activation par l'éclairements artificiel des glandes génitales des deux sexes chez le canard domestique au repos sexuel, Lille, impr. Douriez-Bataille, 1936.
- Thyroïde et croissance testiculaire chez le canard domestique, In: Comptes rendus de la Société de biologie, 1937.
- Titres et travaux scientifiques, Haguenau, Imprimerie E. Dietz, 1938, Online.
- with L. Ott: External and internal factors in sexual activity : effect of irradiation with different wave-lengths on the mechanisms of photostimulation of the hypophyisis and on testicular growth in the immature duck. In: Yale Journal of Biology and Medicine 1944. PMID 21434198
- Glandes endocrines in Traité de zoologie with Pierre-Paul Grassé and Max Aron, 1950 (1. Edition).
- Mesure photoélectrique de la pénétration transorbitaire des radiations visibles jusqu'au cerveau, chez le canard domestique, in collaboration with Ivan Assenmacher and Ladislav Tauc, Paris, Gauthier-Villars, 1954.
- Radiations lumineuses et activité sexuelle du canard. Histoire d'une recherche, In: Revue suisse de zoologie, 64, 1957, S. 577–587.
- The structural components of the hypothalamo-hypophyseal pathway, with particular reference to photostimulation of the gonads in birds. Annals of the New York Academy of Sciences. 117: 23–32. 1964 PMID 14196645
- Leroy P, Benoit J, Vendrely R, Vendrely C. Effects of injections of guinea fowl erythrocytic nuclear substances to genetically known Rhode Island red subjects. Comptes Rendus Hebdomadaires des Séances de l'Académie. 258: 1905–1907.1964 PMID 14139435
- Podliachouk L, Boesiger E, Benoit J. On the blood groups of domestic ducks. | Sur les groupes sanguins de canards domestiques. Comptes Rendus Hebdomadaires des Séances de l'Académie. 258: 2435–2437. 1964 PMID 14138912
- Rôle de l’œil dans la gonadostimulation par la lumière chez les oiseaux, in: Année biologique, 1973.
