= Bénédicte Paviot =

Bénédicte Paviot is an Anglo-French television news reporter, and the UK correspondent of France 24. She lives in London. She was the president of The Foreign Press Association London until 14 January 2020.

== Early life ==
Paviot was born in Paris. She had a British mother (a journalist) and a French father. She went to the Lycée Français Charles de Gaulle in London, a school owned by the French government. She attended the Paris-Sorbonne University (Université Paris-Sorbonne), where she studied languages, law and economics.

== Career ==
She worked for six years in the USA.

=== BBC ===
From 1989 to 2000 she worked as a reporter for BBC News. Between 1998 and 2000 she presented the programme Global on BBC Radio 5 Live.

=== France 24 ===
Since February 2007 she has been the UK correspondent for France 24. France 24 is headquartered at Issy-les-Moulineaux in Paris. Since 2009 she has been on the committee of The Foreign Press Association London. She has also been the London correspondent for BFM TV and BFM Business. She appeared on Any Questions? on 30 May 2014 in West Sussex.
