= Clinton Benoit =

Haitian musician

- Born: Clinton Benoit-Jean; July 20, 1973 (age 52); Jacmel, Haiti
- Genres: Compas, alternative
- Occupation(s): Musician and singer-songwriter
- Instrument(s): Bass, piano
- Labels: Exit Level Records
- Formerly of: Dola Mizik

Clinton Benoit (born Clinton Benoit-Jean on July 20, 1973) is a Haitian musician and singer-songwriter. He has been associated with prominent Haitian kompa musical bands, including Tabou Combo and Magnum Band, based in the United States.

== Early life and education ==
Benoit was born in Jacmel, Haiti. He graduated with a master's degree in Social work and Criminal Justice from Temple University in Philadelphia, Pennsylvania. He also graduated from two law enforcement agencies in the United States. He is currently working on a Ph.D. in behavioral health.

== Career ==
After a short musical career in Haiti, Benoit moved to the United States in 2000. He has performed with many of the top Haitian bands in the United States, such as Tabou Combo, Magnum Band, Mizik-Mizik, Phantom's, D'Zine, Dola-Mizik, Funky Konpa, and Kreyol Alternative. He has also created the first Haitian live salsa.

While in graduate school, Benoit released the album Funky Konpa in 2010. In 2014, Benoit started playing with Dola Mizik and became their lead singer. In 2017, Yves Joseph, a notable singer, composer, and manager of Tabou Combo, contacted Benoit to tour with Tabou Combo.
