= William F. Nast =

American diplomat and entrepreneur

- Born: William Frederick Nast; June 14, 1840; Cincinnati, Ohio, US
- Died: 1893
- Occupations: Diplomat, railroad executive and inventor
- Spouse: Esther A. Benoist
- Children: 4, including Condé
- Parent: William Nast

William Frederick Nast (1840–1893) was an American diplomat and entrepreneur. He was the third president of the Atchison, Topeka and Santa Fe Railway.

Nast was born in Cincinnati, Ohio, on June 14, 1840, the son of Methodist religious leader William Nast. From 1861 to 1865 he served at the American Consulate in Stuttgart, Germany. Upon his return to the US, Nast entered the brokerage business in New York City.

On September 2, 1868, Nast became president of the Atchison, Topeka and Santa Fe Railway, a position he held for less than a month, ending on September 24, 1868.

Also in 1868, he married Esther A. Benoist, a daughter of pioneer St. Louis banker Louis Auguste Benoist. They had four children: Louis, Condé, Ethel, and Estelle.

While living in Europe, William Nast filed for several invention patents, including one for "improvements in the treatment of stable manure, and in the manufacture of paper" on July 6, 1876, awarded February 22, 1878, and one for "improvements in the manufacture of dextrine, sugar and the like, from cellulose and ligneous materials" on November 4, 1880, and US 374618 "Obtaining ammonia from manure", awarded on December 13, 1887.

He died in 1893, and was buried at Calvary Cemetery in St. Louis.

== Footnotes ==
Business positions
Preceded by Samuel C. Pomeroy	President of the Atchison, Topeka and Santa Fe Railway; 1868	Succeeded by Henry C. Lord
