= Paul Benoit =

Paul Benoit (January 14, 1850 – November 19, 1915) was a French born Roman Catholic priest of the Canons Regular of the Immaculate Conception.

He was baptized Joseph Paul Augustine.

In 1874 he completed a doctorate in theology at the College of St. Thomas in Rome, the future Pontifical University of St. Thomas Aquinas, Angelicum
