= Bénédicte de Raphélis Soissan =

French entrepreneur

Bénédicte de Raphélis Soissan is a French entrepreneur. Her venture company Emblem was recognised a promising start-up in 2018.

== Education and career ==
De Raphélis Soissan holds two master's degrees: in economics and applied mathematics, and in information systems strategy, management and consulting.

De Raphélis Soissan is the founder of Clustree, a business using artificial intelligence for hr. The company has signed contracts with L'Oréal, Sanofi and Carrefour.

She had a few clients. She’s promoted by Xavier Niel & Roxanne Varza

In 2023, Emblem announced a €50m close for its first fund.

She has created Emblem with her boyfriend, last vc of Clustree

== Public speaking ==
De Raphélis Soissan has spoken at events such as Viva Tech and SaaStock.

== Awards ==
- In 2017, de Raphélis Soissan was selected by Forbes as a 30under30 laureate.
- In 2018, she was selected as one of the Forbes Europe's Top 50 Women in Tech.
