= Luc Benoist =

French essayist and art historian

- Born: 1893; Paris, France
- Died: 1980 (aged 86–87); Mauves-sur-Loire, France
- Occupations: Art historian, essayist

Luc Benoist born Luc Didier Marie Benoist-Lucy (1893–1980) was a French essayist and art historian. He published many books about art history. His interests were centered on spirituality and symbolism.

== Biography ==
He became assistant curator of the Palace of Versailles, curator of the Musées de France and of the Fine Arts Museum of Nantes (French: Musée des beaux-arts de Nantes) (1947–1959).

== Publications ==
- The romantic Sculpture, Paris, La Renaissance du Livre, 1928
- Versailles and the monarchy, Paris, Editions of Cluny, 1947
- "Michel-Ange", Lausanne, La Guilde du Livre, 1943
- "Georges de La Tour et les caravagesques au Musée des Beaux-Arts de Nantes", La Revue française, 1961
- "L'ésotérisme", Paris, PUF, Collection "Que sais-je", 1963
