= William Nast (Methodist) =

German-born American Methodist clergyman (1807–1899)

Wilhelm (William) Nast
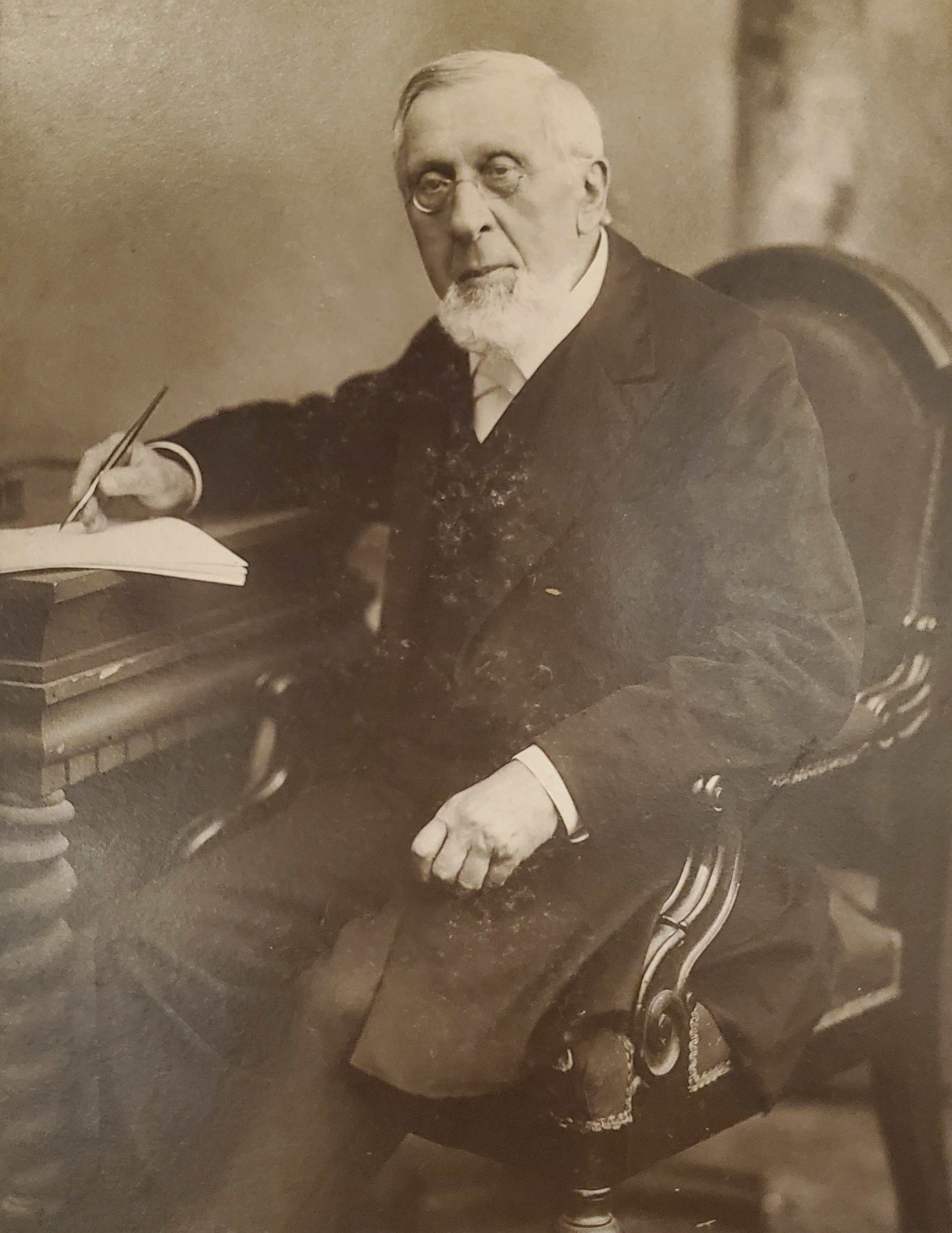
- Wilhelm Nast

Personal details
- Born: 15 June 1807 Stuttgart, Kingdom of Württemberg
- Died: 16 May 1899 (aged 91) Cincinnati, Ohio, United States
- Children: William F. Nast
- Education: University of Tübingen
- Occupation: Clergyman, editor

Wilhelm (William) Nast (15 June 1807– 16 May 1899) was a German-born religious leader and editor. He founded the German Methodist Church of the United States. In addition, he was the grandfather of Condé Montrose Nast.

== Biography ==
Nast was born on 15 June 1807 in Stuttgart, capital of the German Kingdom of Württemberg, with the original forename Wilhelm. He was educated at the University of Tübingen with a view to entering the ministry, but preferred literary pursuits, and after his graduation was connected with the press. Nast emigrated to the United States in 1828, taught at the United States Military Academy, and subsequently became a professor in Kenyon College, Ohio. He united with the Methodist Episcopal Church in 1835, was licensed to preach, and at the conference of that body in 1837 was appointed to establish a German mission in Cincinnati, Ohio. He proved so successful in that enterprise that in the course of twenty years German Methodist churches were established in almost every state in the Union, and in various parts of Germany, Norway, and Sweden. Beyond this Nast served as the first President of German Wallace College which eventually became Baldwin Wallace University He died in Cincinnati on 16 May 1899.

== Publications ==
After 1859 he edited the German publications of the Methodist church, and after 1840 was in charge of the Christian Apologist, the organ of his branch. He translated a large number of religious works into German, and was the author of Christological Meditations (Cincinnati, Ohio, 1858); a commentary on the New Testament in German (1860); the Gospel Records (1866); Christologische Betrachtungen (1866); and Das Christenthum und seine Gegensätze (1883).
