= Pierre Benoit (Malecite) =

Pierre Benoît (died 20 May 1786) was an indigenous person in the Malecite nation who was murdered by settlers in York County, New Brunswick.

He is important to the early history of Canada, and more particularly New Brunswick in that the trial of the two accused following his death was swift and set a standard of justice that was inclusive of First Nations people.
