= Christine Benoit =

Seychellois priest

- Occupation: Anglican priest

Christine Benoit (born 13 August 1972) is the first woman in the Seychelles to be ordained as an Anglican priest.

== Early life ==
Christine Benoit was born on 13 August 1972.

== Education ==
She earned a Diploma in Business Studies and Accounting from Seychelles Polytechnic in 1993.

In 2002, she earned a Diploma in Theology and Diplomas in Ministry with distinction, from the College of the Transfiguration in Grahamstown, South Africa.

== Career ==
From April 1993 to January 2000, she worked in the Internal Audit Division of the Seychelles' Ministry of Finance.

In 2004, Benoit became the first woman to be ordained as an Anglican deacon in the Diocese of Seychelles.

On 26 November 2006, Benoit became the first woman to be ordained as an Anglican priest in the Diocese of Seychelles, during a consecration service that took place at St. Paul's Cathedral in Victoria, Seychelles, in a service led by Bishop Santosh Marray.

In March 2017, she was named one of "14 inspiring women of Seychelles".

In July 2017, she was appointed a member of the National AIDS Council of Seychelles.

As of 2017, Benoit is the "only female Reverend in the Indian Ocean" and is based at Holy Saviour's Church at Anse Royale, Seychelles.
