= Jean Benoist =

Canadian-French doctor and anthropologist (1929–2025)

- Born: 24 November 1929
- Died: 11 November 2025 (aged 95); Aix-en-Provence, France
- Occupation(s): Doctor, anthropologist

Jean Benoist (24 November 1929 – 11 November 2025) was a Canadian-French doctor and anthropologist.

Benoist was best known for his studies on Creole cultures of the Caribbean and the impacts of the plantation economies in former French colonies. He worked most of his career as a professor at the Université de Montréal and the Aix-Marseille University Faculty of Sciences.

Benoist died in Aix-en-Provence on 11 November 2025, at the age of 95.
