= Félix Benoist =

French painter and lithographer

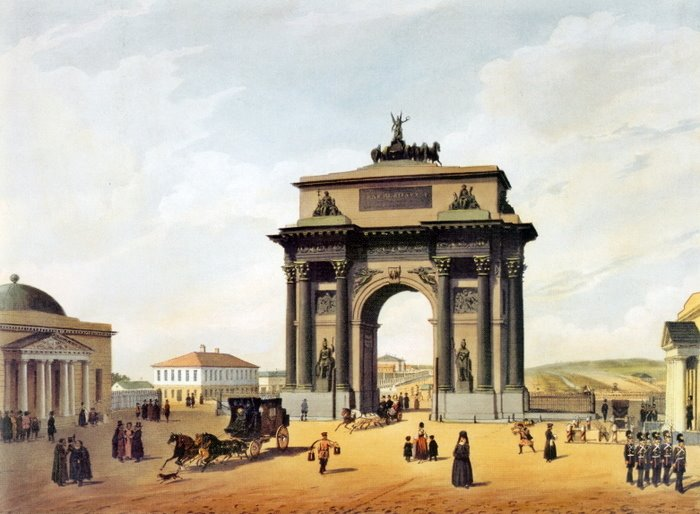
Benoist's Triumphal Gate at Tverskaya Zastava in Moscow, 1848

Félix Benoist (15 April 1818 in Saumur – 1896 in Nantes) was a French painter and lithographer. Some of his works are in the Pushkin Museum in Moscow.
