= Louis Auguste Benoist =

American banker (1803–1867)

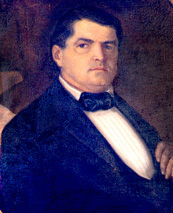
1848 portrait of Benoist

Louis Auguste Benoist (July 12, 1803 – January 17, 1867) was an American banker and financier. He was born in St. Louis, Missouri, then a French settlement in Louisiana, and soon to become a possession of the United States under the Louisiana Purchase. His father, François Marie Benoist, and his mother's father, Charles Sanguinet, came from prominent families and were instrumental in laying the foundations for St. Louis.

== Education ==
After devoting two years to the study of medicine under one of the medical doctors of the city, Benoist undertook the study of law in the office of Horatio Cozzens and became licensed to practice in the legal profession. Thereafter, he entered into practice in partnership with well-known attorney and conveyancer, Pierre Provenchere.

== Early career ==
Once, returning from an extended trip to France to settle his grandfather's estate, Benoist's ship was wrecked in the Bay of Biscay, north of Spain, an area noted for its storms. He narrowly escaped death and months would pass before he was able to obtain passage on another vessel bound for America.

== Banking ==
After his return home, Benoist developed an interest in financial affairs and he abandoned his legal practice in favor of brokerage and real estate. He soon built a thriving business and by 1838 his financial operations had grown to such an extent that he established a branch banking house in New Orleans under the name of Benoist & Hackney, and later under the name of Benoist, Shaw & Co. Both the parent house and the New Orleans branch were regarded as leading financial institutions of the Southwest and did a large business until 1842. Around this time, financial panic Panic of 1837 gripped the country and the St. Louis house was compelled to temporarily suspend operations. Very soon, however, Benoist's financial expertise enabled him to overcome his challenges and he opened the doors of his bank. His depositors were paid what was due them at ten percent interest for the time their funds had been tied up. He is quoted with his characteristic brevity in a story about him in the St. Louis Star and Times, dated May 30, 1933: "Louis A. Benoist & Company will pay on demand." Due to his integrity, he resumed his banking operations with a stronger hold than ever upon public confidence and esteem. The Encyclopedic History of St. Louis wrote of him: "It may truly be said of him that he was not only one of the great Western financiers of his day and generation, but was a remarkably progressive man in every respect. During the financial panic of 1857, when banking-houses were failing all over the United States, his bank weathered the storm, its resources unquestioned, his honor and fidelity to the trust reposed in him being regarded by the public as a guarantee of the stability of the institution of which he was the head."

== Personal life ==
Benoist married three times. He married Sarah Elisabeth Wilson, daughter of Peter Henry Wilson and Gennetta Johnston, in 1849. Between 1850 and 1867 he acquired 476.43 acres of land that had previously been owned by Kenneth McKenzie in what is now the Affton area of unincorporated St. Louis County. In 1853, he hired George Ingham Barnett to build a summer home for his family on the highest point of this property. Benoist's friend Henry Shaw directed the landscaping and gardens.

Benoist died of cholera on January 17, 1867 while visiting Havana, and was buried at Calvary Cemetery in St. Louis. He left an estate valued at more than five million dollars. Benoist's home, The Oakland House, is today a historical site owned and operated by The Affton Historical Society.

His grandson was Condé Benoist Pallen.
