= Condé Benoist Pallen =

American poet

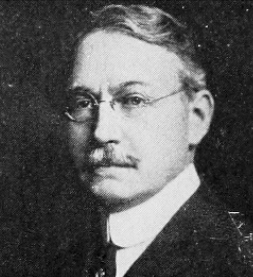
- Born: December 5, 1858; St. Louis, Missouri
- Died: May 26, 1929 (aged 70); New York, New York
- Education: Georgetown University; Saint Louis University
- Occupation: Writer

Condé Benoist Pallen (December 5, 1858 – May 26, 1929) was an American Catholic editor and author. He was editor of Church Progress and the Catholic World from 1887 to 1897. He was managing editor of the Catholic Encyclopedia from 1904 to 1920. He wrote essays, poetry, and novels.

== Early life and education ==
Pallen was born in St. Louis, Missouri in 1858. His father, Dr Montrose Anderson Pallen, was a physician who was a native of Mississippi. His mother, Anne Elizabeth "Eliza" Pallen née Benoist, was a daughter of pioneering St. Louis banker Louis Auguste Benoist, a descendant of a prominent French family who emigrated to Canada, then to Missouri. His nephew and namesake was Condé Nast.

He graduated from Georgetown University in 1880 and received a master's degree from Georgetown in 1883 and a Ph.D. from Saint Louis University in 1885. In 1896, Georgetown awarded him an honorary degree, the LL.D.

== Death ==
Pallen died in New York City on May 26, 1929, after suffering from arteriosclerosis. His remains were buried in a family plot at a cemetery in St. Louis.

== Works ==
- The Philosophy of Literature, (1897)
- Epochs of Literature, (1898)
- What is Liberalism?, (1889)
- New Rubáiyat (1889), poems
- The Feast of Thalarchus: A Dramatic Poem, (1901)
- The Death of Sir Lancelot, and Other Poems, (1902)
- The Meaning of the Idylls of the King, (1904)
- Collected Poems, (1915)
- The Education of Boys, (1916)
- Crucible Island, (1919)

=== Selected articles ===
- "Scepticism and its Relations to Modern Thought," The Catholic World (1883)
- "A Meaning of Idyls of the King," The Catholic World (1885)
- "A Chat by the Way," The Catholic World (1885)
- "Practical People," The Catholic World (1886)
