= Barrak =

Barrak (Arabic: برّاك) or Al-Barrak (Arabic: البرّاك) is a surname. Notable people with the surname include:

- Abdul-Rahman al-Barrak (born c. 1933), senior Saudi cleric
- Abdulrahman bin Abdullah Al Barrak (born 1956), Saudi academic
- Musallam Al-Barrak, member of the Kuwaiti National Assembly
- Nagib Barrak (born 1940), Lebanese alpine skier
- Rony Barrak, Lebanese musician and darbouka player and composer
- Saad Al Barrak, Kuwaiti businessman and investor

== See also ==
- Barack (disambiguation)
  - Barack Obama, U.S. president
- Barak (disambiguation)
- Baraq (disambiguation)
- Barrack (disambiguation)
- Barracks
- B-R-K
