= Barak (name) =

Barak (Hebrew: בָּרָק Bārāq, "lightning") is a masculine name of Hebrew origin. It appears in the biblical Book of Judges as the name of the Israelite general Barak, who alongside Deborah led an attack against the forces of King Jabin of Hazor.

== Etymology ==
The Semitic root B-R-Q has the meaning "to shine"; "lightning". The biblical name ברק Bārāq is given after Barak, a military commander who appears in the Book of Judges.

The Arabic cognate is بَرق barq (not to be confused with بَارَك bārak, which is cognate with Hebrew בָּרוּךְ bārûch). The epithet Barca of the Carthaginian general Hamilcar Barca is derived from the same root, as is the name of the Buraq, the miraculous steed of Muslim Mi'raj tradition.

Although the given name is mostly Jewish and found predominantly in Israel, it has occasionally been used by White Anglo-Saxon Protestants in the early modern period, when given names from the Hebrew Bible were in fashion, as in the name of Barak Longmate, an 18th-century English genealogist.

== Given name ==
- Barak Baba (1257–1307), Anatolian Turkoman dervish
- Barak Norman (c.1670–c.1740), English musical instrument maker
- Barak Longmate (1738–1793), English genealogist and engraver
- Barak Lufan (1987–2022), Israeli kayaker
- Barak Sopé (born 1955), Vanuatu politician
- Barak Badash (born 1982), Israeli football player
- Barak Yitzhaki (born 1984), Israeli football player
- Barak Bakhar (born 1979), Israeli football player
- Barak Eilam, Israeli businessman
- Barak Moshe (born 1991), Israeli football player
- Barak Sultan (1731–1750), member of the Kazakh Khanate dynasty

== Surname ==
- Aharon Barak (born 1936), Israeli former President of the Supreme Court of Israel
- Boaz Barak (born 1974), Israeli-American computer scientist
- Daphne Barak-Erez (born 1965), Israeli jurist serving as a justice of the Supreme Court of Israel
- Dudu Barak (born 1948), Israeli poet, songwriter, and radio presenter
- Ehud Barak (born 1942), Israeli former prime minister
- Elisheva Barak-Ussoskin (1936–2024), Israeli judge
- Keren Barak (born 1972), Israeli lobbyist and politician
- Valia Barak (born 1969), Peruvian journalist and television presenter
- Esenyel Ada Barak (1977-) Turkish Lawyer

== See also ==
- Barack (disambiguation)
- Barak (surname)
- Barak (disambiguation)
- Burak (disambiguation)
- Barakah
- Baraka (disambiguation)
- Baruch (given name)
- Barcas
- Mubarak (name)
