= Barak (surname) =

Barak or Barák is a surname. Notable people with the surname include:

- Antonín Barák (born 1956), Czech former rower
- Antonín Barák (born 1994), Czech international football player
- Aharon Barak (born 1936), former President of the Supreme Court of Israel
- Boaz Barak (born 1974), Israeli-American computer scientist
- Ehud Barak (born 1942), Israeli former Prime Minister and Minister of Defense
- Josef Barák (1833–1883), Czech politician, journalist, and poet
- Jindřich Barák (born 1991), Czech ice hockey player
- Ronald Barak (born 1943), American Olympic gymnast
- Valia Barak (born 1969), Peruvian journalist
- William Barak (1824–1903), last traditional elder of the Wurundjeri-willam clan in Australia
- Ze'ev Barak, a pen name of Wolf Blitzer (born 1948), a German-American writer and TV news anchor
- Dror Barak (1974–2012), Israeli model and pornographic actor

== See also ==
- Barac (disambiguation)
- Barack (disambiguation)
- B-R-K
- B-R-Q
