= Burak, Iran =

Burak (Persian: بورك) in Iran may refer to the following places:

- Burak, Kermanshah
- Burak-e Olya, Kohgiluyeh and Boyer-Ahmad Province
- Burak-e Sofla, Kohgiluyeh and Boyer-Ahmad Province
- Burak, Sistan and Baluchestan
