= Barak (disambiguation) =

Barak was a military general in the Book of Judges in the Bible.

Barak may also refer to:

== People ==
- Barak (given name)
- Barak (surname)
  - Ehud Barak (born 1942), Israeli politician
- Barak (Guantanamo captive 856), an Afghan detainee at Guantanamo Bay
- Barak (tribe), a tribe of Turkomans mainly inhabiting south-central Turkey

== Places ==
- Barak, Iran (disambiguation)
- Barak, Israel
- Barak, Kyrgyzstan
- Barak, Lublin Voivodeship, Poland
- Barak, Masovian Voivodeship, Poland
- Barak River or Ovurei River, in India and Bangladesh
  - Barak Valley, Assam, India
- Barak, Bayat

== Military and weapons ==
- Barak Armored Brigade, an Israeli brigade
- Operation Barak, a 1948 Haganah military operation north of Gaza
- Barak 1, an Israeli naval point-defense missile system
- Barak 8, an Indian-Israeli surface-to-air missile
- Barak MX, an Israeli modular surface-to-air missile system
- SP-21 Barak, a pistol made by Israel Weapons Industries

== Other uses ==
- Barak hound or Bosnian Broken-haired Hound, a dog breed
- Barak, a character in The Belgariad by David Eddings
- Barak Khan (died 1429), Khan of the Golden Horde from 1423 to 1429

== See also ==
- Barack (disambiguation)
- Mubarak (disambiguation), an Arabic variation of the name "Barak"
- Barakah, Arabic for "blessing"
- Barakat (disambiguation)
- Barac (disambiguation)
- Barag (disambiguation)
- Baraq (disambiguation)
- Barrack (disambiguation)
- Baruch (given name), a given name
- Buraq (disambiguation)
- Baraka (disambiguation)
- Baraki Barak, home of the Baraki/Ormuri of Kurdish descent in Afghanistan's Logar Province
- Zadik–Barak–Levin syndrome, a human congenital disorder
- Barakzai, a number of different tribes in Afghanistan and western Pakistan
- Nawa, Afghanistan or Barak Khel, a village in Afghanistan
