= Buraq (disambiguation) =

Buraq is a heavenly hybrid creature in Islamic mythology.

Buraq or Boraq may also refer to:

== Places ==
- Buraq, Iran, a village
- Borun, Iran, also known as Borāq, a village
- Burraq, Syria
- Al-Buraq, Syria

== Other uses ==
- Buraq Air, a Libyan Airline
- Buraq Hajib, 13th century leader of the Qara Khitay people
- Buraq Express, a passenger train in Pakistan
- Radio Buraq, an FM radio station in Pakistan
- Buraq Wall, another name for the Western Wall in Jerusalem
  - Al-Buraq Mosque
- Al Boraq, or Casablanca–Tangier high-speed rail line, in Morocco
- Buraq Ansari, antagonist of the 2019 Indian film Commando 3, played by Gulshan Devaiah

== Weapons ==
=== Drones ===
- NESCOM Burraq, a Pakistani Unmanned combat aerial vehicle

== See also ==
- Barack (disambiguation)
- Barak (disambiguation)
- Baraq (disambiguation)
- 1929 Palestine riots, or the Buraq Uprising
- Boragh, an Iranian armoured personnel carrier
- Bouraq Indonesia Airlines the former company (closed in 2005).
- Burak (name)
- NESCOM Burraq, a Pakistani unmanned combat aerial vehicle
- Western Wall (disambiguation)
