= Ber (name) =

Ber is both a given name and a surname. It is sometimes paired with Dov (דב or דוב), a Hebrew male given name meaning "bear", from which the Yiddish name "Ber" (בער) was derived (cognate with "bear"). Notable people with the name include:

== Given name ==
- Avrom Ber Gotlober (1811–1899), Jewish writer, poet, playwright, historian, journalist and educator
- Ber Borochov (1881–1917), Marxist Zionist
- Ber Groosjohan (1897–1971), Dutch footballer
- Boruch Ber Leibowitz (1870–1940), Haredi rabbi
- José Ber Gelbard (1917–1977), Argentine activist and politician
- Yisroel Ber Odesser (1888–1994), controversial figure in the Breslov movement

== Surname ==
- Josef Ber, Australian actor
- Kalman Ber (born 1957), Ashkenazi Chief Rabbi of Israel

== See also ==
- Dov-Ber, Jewish tautological name
- Berek (disambiguation), diminutive, later separate name
- Baruch (given name)
