= Scott Russell (executive) =

Australian business executive (born 1973)

- Born: Scott Russell; 1973 (age 52–53); Ballarat, Victoria, Australia
- Education: Deakin University
- Occupation: Chief Executive Officer
- Years active: 1990s-present
- Employer: NICE

Scott Russell (born 1973) is an Australian business executive and the CEO of NiCE. He has served as the company CEO since January 2025, overseeing the increasing demand in the customer experience market to increase artificial intelligence use.

Russell worked in executive roles at IBM Consulting and SAP, prior to joining NiCE.

== Early life ==
Russell was born in 1973 and was raised in Ballarat, Victoria, Australia. He studied at Federation University, where he earned a Bachelor's degree in Business, followed by further studies at Deakin University.

== Career ==
Russell worked at PwC in the 1990s. In 2001, IBM announced that it would acquire PwC Consulting, and it was rebranded as IBM Consulting in 2002. Following the acquisition and rebrand, Russell relocated to Singapore with IBM in a new position.

After a decade at IBM, Russell joined SAP in 2010, initially focused on the Asian market, but working across several global markets. In 2014, Russell became the Chief Operating Officer for the Asia Pacific Japan region.

Russell joined SAP's Executive Board in 2021, when he became the corporation's Chief Revenue Officer.

In the summer of 2024, it was announced that Barak Eilam would step down as the CEO of NiCE after over a decade in the role. SAP announced on July 30, 2024, that Russell would be leaving his role on its board, due to "restructuring". On August 15, 2024, NiCE announced Russell as its next CEO. Eilam remained CEO until the end of 2024, with Russell taking over in January 2025.

Following his appointment, Russell outlined plans to expand NiCE's use of artificial intelligence and pursue further growth in the customer experience software market. This expansion included establishing partnerships with other technology companies. NiCE throughout 2025 announced major partnerships with Amazon Web Services, ServiceNow, Salesforce and Snowflake.

In July 2025, NiCE announced its first major acquisition under Russell, acquiring German artificial intelligence company Cognigy for approximately $955 million. The acquisition expanded NiCE's capabilities in conversational and agentic AI, with Cognigy's technology intended to complement its existing CXone platform. During 2026, NiCE continued to increase its focus on artificial intelligence and customer experience software under Russell's leadership. This was coupled with a reported increase in AI-focused revenue, which saw share price increase 10% following the publication of 2025 sales figures. The company's strategic direction reflected a growing emphasis on AI-driven customer service technology, particularly following its acquisition of Cognigy in 2025.
