= Baruch (given name) =

Baruch (Hebrew: בָּרוּךְ, Modern: Barūḵ, Tiberian: Bārūḵ, "Blessed", Polish: Berek) is a masculine name among Jews used from Biblical times to the present, which is sometimes used as surname. It is also found, though more rarely, among Christians—particularly among Protestants who use Old Testament names.

Except for its use as a name, this is also related to berakhah or bracha (Hebrew: ברכה; plural ברכות, berakhot), which is a Jewish blessing. See also: Baraka and Barakah.

The root B-R-K meaning "blessing" is also present in other Semitic languages. The most common Arabic form is the passive form Mubarak, but the form Barak (Barack) is also used. In Polish it is Berek.

Benedictus is a Latin name with similar meaning; cf. Baruch Spinoza or Benedictus de Spinoza.

== People with the given name Baruch ==
=== Bible ===
- Baruch ben Neriah, aide to the prophet Jeremiah
- Baruch, son of Zabbai; one of Nehemiah's helpers in repairing the walls of Jerusalem
- Baruch, son of Col-Hozeh; a member of the Tribe of Judah who settled in Jerusalem

=== Later times ===
- Baruch Agadati (1895–1976), Israeli painter, dancer, and film director
- Baruch Ben Haim (1921–2005), assistant chief rabbi of the Syrian Jewish community in Brooklyn, New York
- Baruch Blumberg (1925–2011), American Nobel Prize-winning physician, developed Hepatitis B vaccine
- Baruch Feinberg (1933–2007), Israeli Olympic javelin thrower
- Baruch Goldstein (1956–1994), American-Israeli settler physician who murdered 29 Muslim worshipers in 1994
- Baruch Hirson (1921-1999), South African Trotskyist activist, political prisoner and academic. Author of Year of Fire, Year of Ash: the Soweto revolt, roots of a revolution.
- Baruch Kurzweil (1907–1972), Israeli literary critic
- Baruch Levine (born 1977), American Orthodox Jewish singer-composer
- Baruch Ostrovsky (1890–1960), first mayor of Ra'anana, Israel
- Baruch Shemtov (born 1987), American journalist, television host, fashion designer, and entrepreneur
- Baruch Shmailov (born 1994), Israeli Olympic judoka
- Baruch Spinoza (1632–1677), Dutch rationalist philosopher
- Baruch Schleisinger Weil (1802–1893) American businessman and politician
- Baruch Steinberg (1897–1940), chief Rabbi of the Polish Army, victim of the Katyn massacre
- Baruch Tenembaum (1933–2025), Argentine interfaith activist
- Baruch Zuckerman (1887–1970), American-Israeli and leading proponent of Yad Vashem

=== Fictional characters ===
- The Baruch of Baghdad, the king of the Saracens in Wolfram von Eschenbach's Parzival
- Baruch, a fictional angel in the His Dark Materials series
- The real name of Billy Joe Cobra, of the television show Dude, That's My Ghost

== See also ==
- Katarina Barruk
