= Burak =

Burak may refer to:

- Burak (name), given name and those who bear it
- Al-Buraq, Syria, village in Syria
- Burak, Iran (disambiguation), places in Iran
- Burak (cosmetic), a facial cosmetic paste used by the Sama-Bajau people of Southeast Asia
- Burak language, an Adamawa language of Nigeria
