= Mubarak (name) =

Mubarak (Arabic: مبارك, romanized: mubārak) is an Arabic given name. A variant form is Baraka or Barack (Arabic: بارك, romanized: bārak), analogous to the Hebrew verb "barakh" בָרַךּ, meaning "to kneel, bless", and derived from the concept of kneeling in prayer. The Arabic prefix m- is a passive participle prefix, meaning "who or which is blessed" (baraka). Mubarak is thus the Arabic equivalent of the Latinate name "Benedict" (from Benedictus "blessed" or, literally, "well-spoken").

Etymologically, the name is from the Semitic consonantal root BRK, derivatives of which occur in numerous formulas of politeness in Arabic. The feminine noun barakah (بركة) means "blessing". In Islam, and specifically within the Sufi tradition, it has a meaning similar to "charisma". The Hebrew cognate is berakhah. In the Quran, the olive tree and the 27th of Ramadan are mubǎrak.

The Biblical name Baruch is the Hebrew cognate of Barack. There is no specific cognate for Mubarak, which includes the Arabic participle prefix mu-.

The name is sometimes written differently; for example, the last name of singer Shakira (a Lebanese-Colombian) is Mebarak.

== Given name ==
- Mubarak Al-Beloushi (born 1986), Qatari footballer
- Mubarak Al-Sabah (1837–1915), ruler of Kuwait
- Mubarak Ali Gilani (1936–2021), Pakistani Sufi
- Mubarak Awad (born 1943), Palestinian-American psychologist
- Mubarak Begum (1936–2016), Indian film singer
- Mubarak bin Mohammed Al Nahyan (1935–2010), Emirati royal and politician
- Mubarak Hassan Shami (born 1980), Kenyan-born Qatari long-distance runner
- Mubarak Khan (1299–1321), regent of Khilji Dynasty
- Mubarak Mohammed Muntaka (born 1971), Ghanaian politician
- Mubarak Shaddad (1915–1980s), Sudanese politician
- Mubarak Shah (Chagatai Khan) (died 1266), Chagatai Khan
- Mubarak Wakaso (born 1990), Ghanaian footballer
- Mubarak Zarouk (1916–1965), Sudanese statesman

== Surname ==
- Hosni Mubarak (1928–2020), President of Egypt 1981-2011. His family includes the following:
  - Suzanne Mubarak (born 1941), First Lady of Egypt 1981-2011; wife of Hosni
  - Alaa Mubarak (born 1960), Egyptian businessman; elder son of Hosni and Suzanne
  - Gamal Mubarak (born 1963), Egyptian politician; younger son of Hosni and Suzanne
- Ahmad Awad Bin Mubarak (born 1968), Yemeni politician
- Ali Pasha Mubarak (1823–1893), Egyptian public works and education minister
- Jehan Mubarak (born 1981), American-born Sri Lankan cricketer
- Majid Fandi Al-Mubaraki, Iraqi-Australian writer and researcher
- Saba Mubarak (born 1976), Jordanian actress and producer
- Shakira Mebarak, known as Shakira (born 1977), Colombian pop-star of Lebanese origin

== See also ==
- Barak (disambiguation)
- Baraka (disambiguation)
- Barakah
