= Barák =

Barák (feminine: Baráková) is a Czech surname. Notable people with the surname include:

- Antonín Barák (born 1994), Czech footballer
- Antonín Barák (rowing) (born 1956), Czech rower
- Josef Barák (1833–1883), Czech politician, journalist and poet
- Jindřich Barák (born 1991), Czech ice hockey player
- Václav Barák (born 1990), Czech athlete
