= Barach =

Barach is an eastern Ashkenazic surname and is derived from the acronym ב-ר-ח of the Hebrew patronymic phrase בן רבי חיים, Ben Rav Haim, meaning 'son of Rav Haim'. Another spelling of the Jewish surname is Brach. It may also be an Americanization of Slavic surnames Barac, Barać, Barač, or Barącz. Notable people with the surname include:

- Alvan Barach (1895–1977), American physician
- Derek Barach (1995), American ice hockey player
- Jim Barach (1956), American politician and former weather broadcaster

== See aso ==
- Barak
- Brach (disambiguation)
