= Shelly Yachimovich =

Israeli politician

- שלי יחימוביץ׳
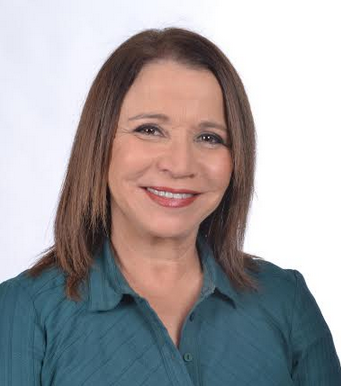
- Yachimovich in 2019

Leader of the Opposition
- In office 1 January 2019 – 30 April 2019
- Prime Minister: Benjamin Netanyahu
- Preceded by: Tzipi Livni
- Succeeded by: Benny Gantz (de facto)
- In office 5 February 2013 – 25 November 2013
- Prime Minister: Benjamin Netanyahu
- Preceded by: Shaul Mofaz
- Succeeded by: Isaac Herzog
- In office 9 May 2012 – 23 July 2012
- Prime Minister: Benjamin Netanyahu
- Preceded by: Shaul Mofaz
- Succeeded by: Shaul Mofaz

Faction represented in the Knesset
- 2006–2015: Labor
- 2015–2019: Zionist Union
- 2019: Labor

Personal details
- Born: 28 March 1960 (age 66) Kfar Saba, Israel
- Education: Ben Gurion University of the Negev

Shelly Rachel Yachimovich (Hebrew: שלי רחל יחימוביץ׳; born 28 March 1960) is an Israeli politician, who served three terms as the official Leader of the Opposition, a member of the Knesset, and a member of the Foreign Affairs and Defense Committee. She served as leader of the Israeli Labor Party between 2011 and 2013. Before entering politics, she was a journalist, an author, and a television and radio commentator.

== Early life ==
Yachimovich was born in Kfar Saba. Her father, Moshe, was a construction worker and her mother, Hanna, a teacher. Both parents were Holocaust survivors who immigrated to Israel from Poland. She became politically engaged at an early age, and was expelled from Ostrovsky high school in Ra'anana at age 15 for hanging up posters denouncing the principal's style of leadership. She was conscripted in 1978, and in 1985, Yachimovich graduated from Ben-Gurion University of the Negev with a degree in behavioural science.

== Journalism and media career ==
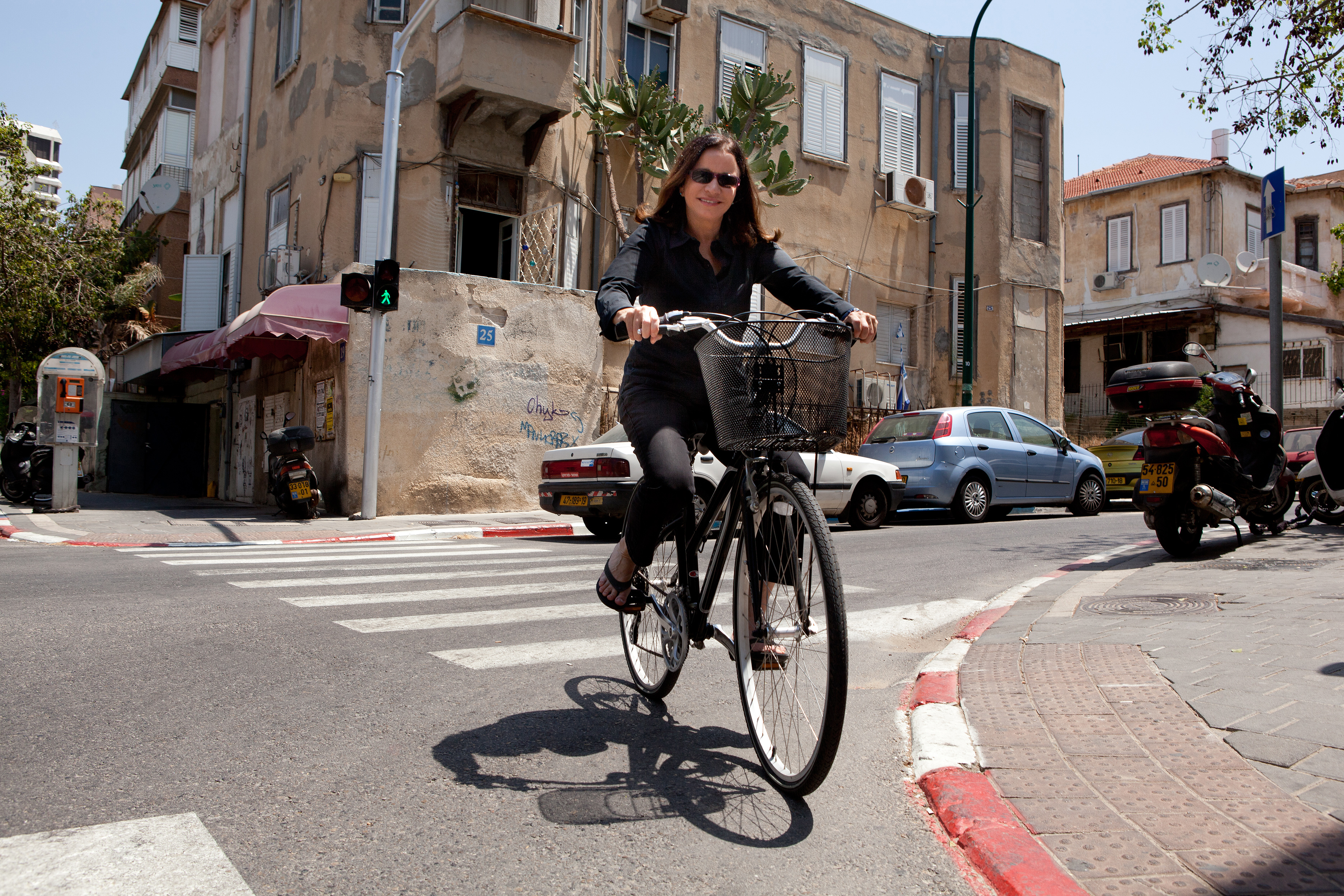
Yachimovich on a bicycle in the streets of Tel Aviv, 2011

While studying in Beersheba, she worked as a correspondent for the Al HaMishmar newspaper. She went on to become an anchor for the Israel Broadcasting Authority's radio station Reshet Bet, earning a reputation as opinionated and critical of conventional wisdom and the establishment. As a journalist, she covered women's and social welfare issues. In October 2000, following a work dispute, she left her radio job and joined Channel 2 TV, where she hosted a political talk show and served as a news commentator. She also did a weekly program for Israel Army Radio (Galei Tzahal).

=== Southern Lebanon conflict ===
As a journalist, Yachimovich was credited in giving prominent stage on national radio for activists of the "Four Mothers" advocacy group who campaigned for Israel's withdrawal from Southern Lebanon.

The group was established in February 1997 by four mothers who have lost their sons in the Israeli helicopter disaster. The founders formed a pressure group advocating a withdrawal, pointing out the excessive cost in human lives of a continuing Israeli presence in Southern Lebanon. Yachimovich and military affairs journalist Carmela Menashe were the first to give stage to the group's agenda, helping the grass-roots movement strike at the heart of Israeli public debate.

The growing discussion over Israel's role in Southern Lebanon eventually led prime minister Ehud Barak to announce a withdrawal plan in 2000, amid vocal criticism over Yachimovich's agenda from military officials. Four Mothers' group leaders later noted that Menashe's and Yachimovich's support was crucial in promoting their goal.

=== Bank Hapoalim layoffs ===
Bank Hapoalim, one of Israel's largest financial institutions, had announced in late 2002 that it was about to cut 10% of its workforce of about 900 employees, many of whom were tenured under the bank's employment contract. Criticism of the plan came from the Histadrut labor union, which questioned the necessity of such a massive layoff amidst ILS 1 billion in profits for the bank that year. First filing legal action against the bank via the Tel Aviv District Labor Court, the Histadrut union also went on to embark on a massive public relations campaign against the bank's management.

The bank's main shareholder, American-Israeli businesswoman Shari Arison, one of Israel's wealthiest women, led a press conference to defend the layoffs, on advice from her public relations consultant Rani Rahav. Arison expressed regret for the layoffs, characterizing management's decision as an example of national responsibility. Critics rejected her argument as being poorly constructed, claiming that her remarks only seemed to demonstrate that for the country's wealthiest, national responsibility means profit maximization.

Histadrut labor union chairman Amir Peretz, who was facing upcoming Histadrut leadership elections, then led a campaign personally attacking Arison, publishing billboards with the slogan 'Shari Arison laughs, 900 families cry'. Agitated about the slogan, Arison threatened Poster Media, the company that put up the billboards and which was partly owned by Arison, with a $10 million libel suit, successfully halting the campaign.

Yachimovich entered the discussion by airing a critical review of Shari Arison's conduct, on her editorial segment in Channel 2 news. She warned that the threats of a lawsuit provided an example of how the rich and successful are able to arrange things to their liking, in this case by firing such a large number of employees and then silencing public criticism of the move.

The next day, Arison's consultant Rani Rahav published an assertive open letter attacking Yachimovich, faxing it to 500 of Israel's top CEO's and media personalities. The letter, containing the phrase 'Bad, bad Shelly' multiple times, was described by press as childish.

In the letter, Rahav asked Yachimovich to depart Israel, claiming she should be grateful that wealthy people choose to live in Israel, invest in its economy and donate to charitable causes within it. Later that year, when Arison relocated her residence to the United States, Rahav published yet a second open letter titled 'You won, Shelly', blaming Yachimovich in Arison's relocation.

== Entry to political life ==
On 29 November 2005, two weeks after Amir Peretz was interviewed by Yachimovich on "Meet the Press" for the occasion of his election as leader of the Labor Party, Yachimovich announced she was leaving journalism and entering politics. She ran in the Labor primaries and achieved the ninth place on the party's list for the 2006 elections, in which she was elected to the Knesset.

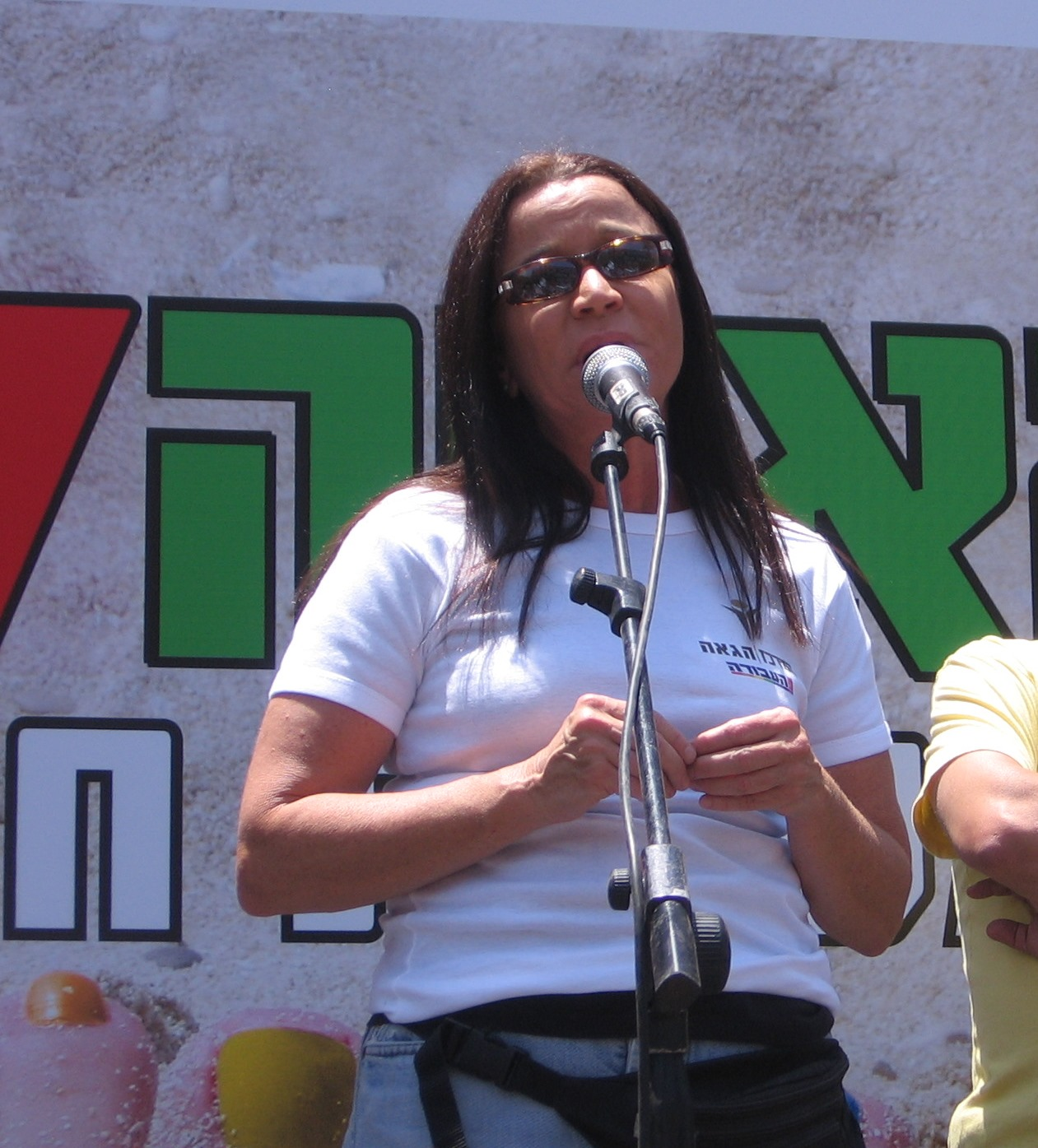
Shelly Yachimovich at Gay Pride Tel Aviv 2007

Yachimovich was criticized on her sharp move from journalism to politics. Critics noted that it was inappropriate for a watchdog journalist to become a member of the system she was supposed to be guarding. Others alleged that the interview she had with Peretz shortly before joining politics must have lacked professional impartiality, according to journalism ethics. Following criticisms, a cooling-off period of three months was imposed on journalists by Israeli broadcast regulator The Second Authority in late 2005. Yachimovich later claimed on her behalf that she didn't have the slightest idea of joining politics on her mind during that interview. She also declared that she opposes any cooling-off periods on joining politics, arguing that these should instead be imposed on parliamentarians and civil servants who upon leaving the public sphere immediately join high-profile positions in the private sector, exploiting their influence to make private profits.

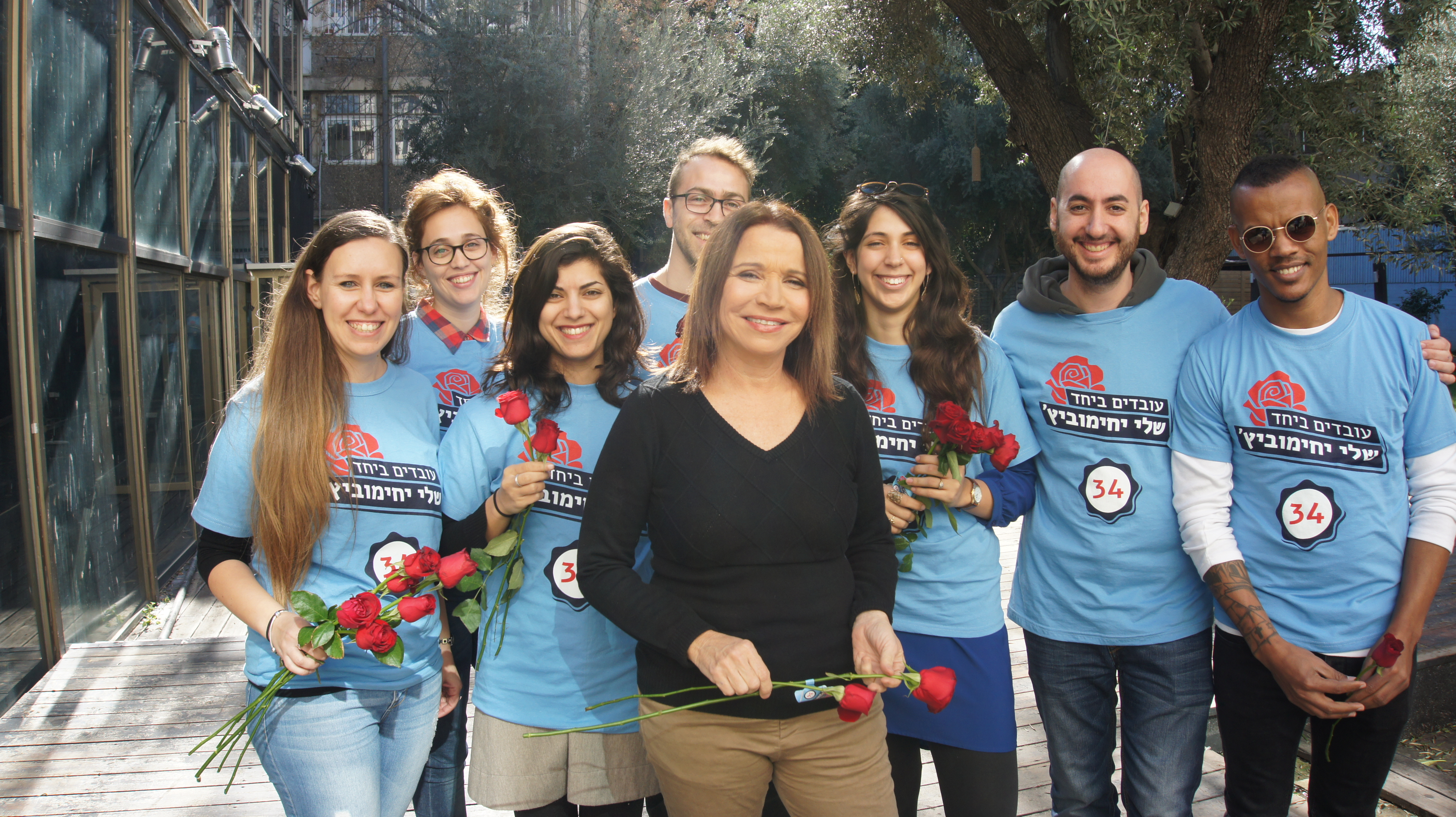
Shelly Yachimovich with activists in 2015

Despite criticisms, her entry to political life was preceded and followed by numerous other Israeli journalists who ran for a Knesset seat, including Nitzan Horowitz, Yair Lapid, Nachman Shai, Uri Orbach, Ofer Shelach and Merav Michaeli. Public debate has continued to question this practice, leading to a failed Knesset bill to be debated in 2010 and again in 2012, proposing a cooling-off period of 6 months for journalists before entering politics.

== 17th Knesset ==
The 17th Knesset, which span from April 2006 to February 2009, saw the Labor party joining the Kadima-led coalition under prime-minister Ehud Olmert in the thirty-first government of Israel. Yachimovich was quickly growing critical of Labor's role in the government, as she believed the party was not executing its social-democratic mandate. She also became frustrated of then party leader Peretz, citing his choice to become Minister of Defense over an economically related minister, as a choice that created a personal, ideological and political drift between them. She consequently started to divert from voting along party lines and opposed the 2006 State Budget bill. Responding to criticisms, she justified her stance by claiming that most Knesset members and ministers who voted for the State Budget bill had not actually read it, and had not debated its long term consequences, which she deemed irrational. In the February 2007 party leadership primaries, she endorsed Ehud Barak over Ami Ayalon, pointing out that while she couldn't see the difference between them as both were not representing social-democratic values, Barak still had a better shot at leading the party to electoral victories.

She received The Knight of Quality Government award from the Movement for Quality Government in Israel in 2008. The selection committee commemorated her as being one of the very few elected officials who attacks Crony capitalism practices; who consistently supports the Supreme Court and State Comptroller legitimacy and standing; and who voices out for the issues of the less-privileged classes of society.

In 2009, Yachimovich leaked an undisclosed version of the forthcoming State Budget bill's Arrangements Act, the traditional addendum to the yearly budget, on her website and invited ordinary citizens to provide comments on its contents. She also released a detailed criticism of many of the State Budget's proposals, mainly in regard to proposed cutbacks to governmental services. The publication of the complete document, which under normal circumstances is being kept under the strictest secrecy in the Ministry of Finance and only distributed in small portions to selected officials, has been described as explosive, and an unprecedented event in the bill's history. As a result of the leak, the Bill came under public scrutiny and was susceptible to a wide debate in the Knesset and over the media, eventually causing the Ministry of Finance to withdraw some of its proposals for budget cutbacks. Furthermore, the case brought into question the Arrangements Act's objectives, with critics noting it bypasses the Knesset by essentially cancelling out previous legislation in a swipe of hand.

=== Legislation ===
Yachimovich legislated and participated in legislating 17 laws during term. Among the more prominent ones are:

- The Wages Protection law (24th amendment): Payslips.

The amendment was put in force to make it easier for employees to detect ill labour practices. It made it illegal for employers not to provide a monthly payslip detailing the data on which employees' salary was based. The amendment required employers to keep a detailed track of employees' work and make it transparent to the latter. Payslips should state data such as employees' base salary, social benefits, overtime hours, vacation days, sick days, and the eventual hourly wage. The amendment also required employers to keep track of employees attendance for the first time, targeting the protection of employees working long hours in Law, Audit and Hi-tech firms. Following the legislation, many employers from those sectors feared their employees would notice that they aren't making the national minimum hourly wage, when taking into account their fixed salaries versus the excessively long work hours common in those industries.

- The Right to Sit While Working law.

The law aimed at stopping a common practice in many grocery stores and drug stores where cashiers were asked to work the tills while standing for the entire shift, although there was no practical reason for them not to sit. Labor rights organizations backed the law by claiming that the practice was insulting and disrespectful, while large chain-store retailer Super-Pharm fiercely lobbied against the law, arguing it should reserve the right to serve customers the way it sees fit. The law recognized the right to sit while working, and forced employers to provide chairs for the cashiers, salespersons and service workers unless employers could prove that the job at hand could not have been carried out from a sitting position.

- The Knesset law (25th amendment): Regulating Lobbyists' Activity.

The amendment enforced the first ever regulation over lobbyists' activity in the Knesset, aiming at better transparency and accountability over the legislative process. It required lobbyists traipsing through the Knesset to wear orange ribbons identifying them as such. As press alleged that there hardly exists any legislative process in which lobbyists don't get involved in some way, the amendment aimed at identifying the varying interests and funding behind Lobby activity. The amendment gained public attention shortly afterwards, when journalist Ilana Dayan revealed on her investigative show Uvda ("Fact") a candid camera footage, showing employees of Gilad Government Relations lobbying firm brag about influencing legislation to promote business interests. The amendment allowed Speaker of the Knesset Ruby Rivlin to identify the lobbying firm's employees and bar them from further entering the Knesset.

=== Committees ===
- Member, Subcommittee for the Problem of Pension Payments
- Member, Subcommittee on Public Corruption
- Member, Subcommittee for Religious Services
- Chairperson, Committee on the Rights of the Child
- Member, House Committee
- Member, Finance Committee
- Member, State Control Committee
- Member, Parliamentary Inquiry Committee on the Integration of Arab Employees in the Public Sector

== 18th Knesset ==
She retained her seat in the 2009 elections, in fifth place on the Labor list. Shortly afterwards, she came out vocally against party leader Ehud Barak for negotiating a place for Labor in the Likud-led coalition of the thirty-second government of Israel. Believing that Labor would act as a dead weight on Benjamin Netanyahu's right-wing government, she opposed joining the coalition and warned that Labor would serve as a fig leaf for right-winged governmental agenda. The debate escalated to Yachimovich and six other Labor MK's being named as 'Labor rebels', who formed an anti-Barak alliance and restrained from voting along party lines, although officially being part Netanyahu's government. Trying to appease her, Barak offered Yachimovich an appointment as the Minister of Industry, Trade and Labor in the upcoming government. She refused the offer despite admitting it was a post she was aiming at, and continued opposing Labor's part in the government, up until early 2011 when Barak diverted from the party and the remaining MK's agreed on leaving the government.

During the 18th Knesset, Yachimovich continued to lead Knesset in passing legislation, and was referred to as a diligent parliamentarian. She has been described as a staunch social-democrat, highly critical and belligerent, who does not hesitate to take on fat cats and the lobbyists who represent them. She has been described as using unorthodox politics, with critics noting she managed to aggravate both economic right and dovish left with her stances.

After Ehud Barak left the Labor Party to form Independence in January 2011, a poll found that Yachimovich was the most popular of the likely candidates for leadership of the Labor Party. On 3 March 2011 Yachimovich declared her candidacy for party leadership and sought to sign up new members for the party. By the time the membership drive ended on 6 June, Yachimovich, according to estimates, had signed up more than 17,300 new members.

A month prior to primary elections, an interview Yachimovich gave for a Haaretz feature article drew fierce critique from both wings of the political spectrum, and became one of her most highly referred to interviews. She stated that she does "not see the settlement project as a sin and a crime", since it was originally based on a widespread consensus that included the Labor Party. She argued that the Israeli Left is locked in a false paradigm that is portraying the Settlement project as responsible for the erosion of the welfare state, while actually the shortage of resources to relieve social injustices was a direct result of Benjamin Netanyahu's economic agenda. She concluded that Labor should first and foremost represent a social-democratic agenda, ahead of a Dovish agenda, and maintained that poverty, ignorance and broad social disparities should be tackled first since they tend to formulate a common ethos towards war.

Left wing commentators slashed her the following days as being a representative of the 'fake Left', as well as using populist stances to approach a more centrally and Hawkish leaning audience. Others argued that her order of priorities was flawed, noting that social justice within Israel can't be achieved without peace with its neighbors. The issue became pivotal to the upcoming primary elections, with fractions of the party forming to attack or defend her over those remarks. Despite criticism, she reiterated her opinion on the matter in several following instances, arguing that her only sin is that she does not adhere to the 'Post-Zionist order'.

In the leadership primary elections, held on 12 September Yachimovich came in first among the four contenders, defeating Peretz by a slim margin of 32% to 31%. Since the Labor party constitution requires a minimum of 40% of the votes for a first-round decision, a run-off was held on 21 September resulting in a 54% to 46% victory (a margin of slightly more than 3,500 votes) over Peretz. In the early hours of 22 September, Yachimovich was officially declared leader of the Labor Party at party headquarters, the second woman to hold that position after Golda Meir.

Following the announcement on the formation of a unity government on 8 May 2012 and Kadima's departure from the opposition, the Labor Party became the largest party in the opposition. As such, Yachimovich was nominated unopposed as Leader of the Opposition. She held this post for 70 days, until Kadima left the government and became the largest opposition party once again.

=== Legislation ===
Yachimovich legislated and participated in legislating 28 laws during term. Among the more prominent ones are:

- Layoffs Severance Package Law (25th amendment): Recurring Layoffs Prevention

The amendment established that any interruption of employer-worker relations of less than three months does not terminate seniority rights. The amendment shut a loop-hole in the employment law of low wage labor in cleaning, security and catering services, as well as other low paid professions commonly outsourced to sub-contractor umbrella companies, in which employees had been fired and immediately re-hired once a year to exempt employers from providing seniority rights. This common practice created many low wage employees who, despite working for the same employer for years, were restricted from seniority benefits such as expanded pension provisions as entitled by Israeli labor laws. Responding to national and international criticism of Israel's excessively prevalent Working Poor class, and to the 2011 social protests, the amendment empowered Israel's major labor union, the Histadrut, to take action to improve labor conditions for those employees.

- Work and Leisure Hours Law (13th amendment): The Right to Take a Break For Using the Toilets, Employer's Responsibility Not to Deduct the Break From Salary, And Its Responsibility to Construct Decent Lavatory Facilities.

The 'toilets law' came to force after cashiers of some retail chain-stores complained that they were implicitly restricted from leaving tills to use the toilets throughout their shifts, lasting up to nine consecutive hours. This has resulted in employees refraining from consuming fluids and exposure to related health risks. Legislators harshly criticized the practice and noted that "the existence of such a situation in the State of Israel in 2008 is unthinkable, and workplaces must not be allowed to revoke employees' basic rights as human beings".

- Prohibition of Discrimination in Products, Services and Entry into Places of Entertainment and Public Places Law (2nd amendment): Prohibition of Discrimination, Selection and Infinite Delay at Entrance to Public Places.

The amendment was suggested after an instance of documented discrimination against a dark-skinned youth received wide media attention in 2010. A dark-skinned Golani Brigade soldier was denied entry to a night club due to an undisclosed selection policy, while his white-skinned friends were let in without hassles. The case brought into question the selection practices of some entertainment venues in Israel, which were claimed to include de facto discrimination against minorities while circumventing anti-discrimination laws. As the amendment was designed to specifically tackle such practices, legal sources expressed their view that it will strengthen anti-discriminatory norms and will make it easier to prosecute club-owners who violate the law.

=== Committees ===
- Member, Labor, Welfare and Health Committee
- Member, Subcommittee for Confidential Matters
- Member, Subcommittee for Pensions in the Evolving Kibbutz
- Member, Joint Committee for the budget of the Company for Restitution of Holocaust Victims Assets
- Member, Finance Committee
- Chairperson, Ethics Committee
- Alternate Member, Finance Committee
- Member, Joint Committee for the Defense Budget

== 19th-20th Knessets ==
Though the Labor Party gained seven seats in the January 2013 elections, Yachimovich was defeated in the party leadership election held 22 November 2013 in which Isaac Herzog was elected leader of the Labor Party, defeating Yachimovich by 58.5% to 41.5%. In doing so, he became Leader of the Opposition.

In July 2019, Yachimovich announced her retirement from politics.

== Bibliography ==
Yachimovich has authored three books. The first two are novels and the third is a non-fiction critical review of Israeli society which according to critics challenges the neoliberal discourse in Israel.

- Eshet Ish (Devoted Wife). Keshet: Israel, 2001.
- Miskhakei Zuggot (Couples' Games). Keshet: Israel, 2003.
- Anakhnu: Al Kalkala, Hevra, Musar Uleumiyut Beyisrael (We: On Economy, Society, Morality and Nationality in Israel). Am Oved: Israel, 2011.

== Family and personal life ==
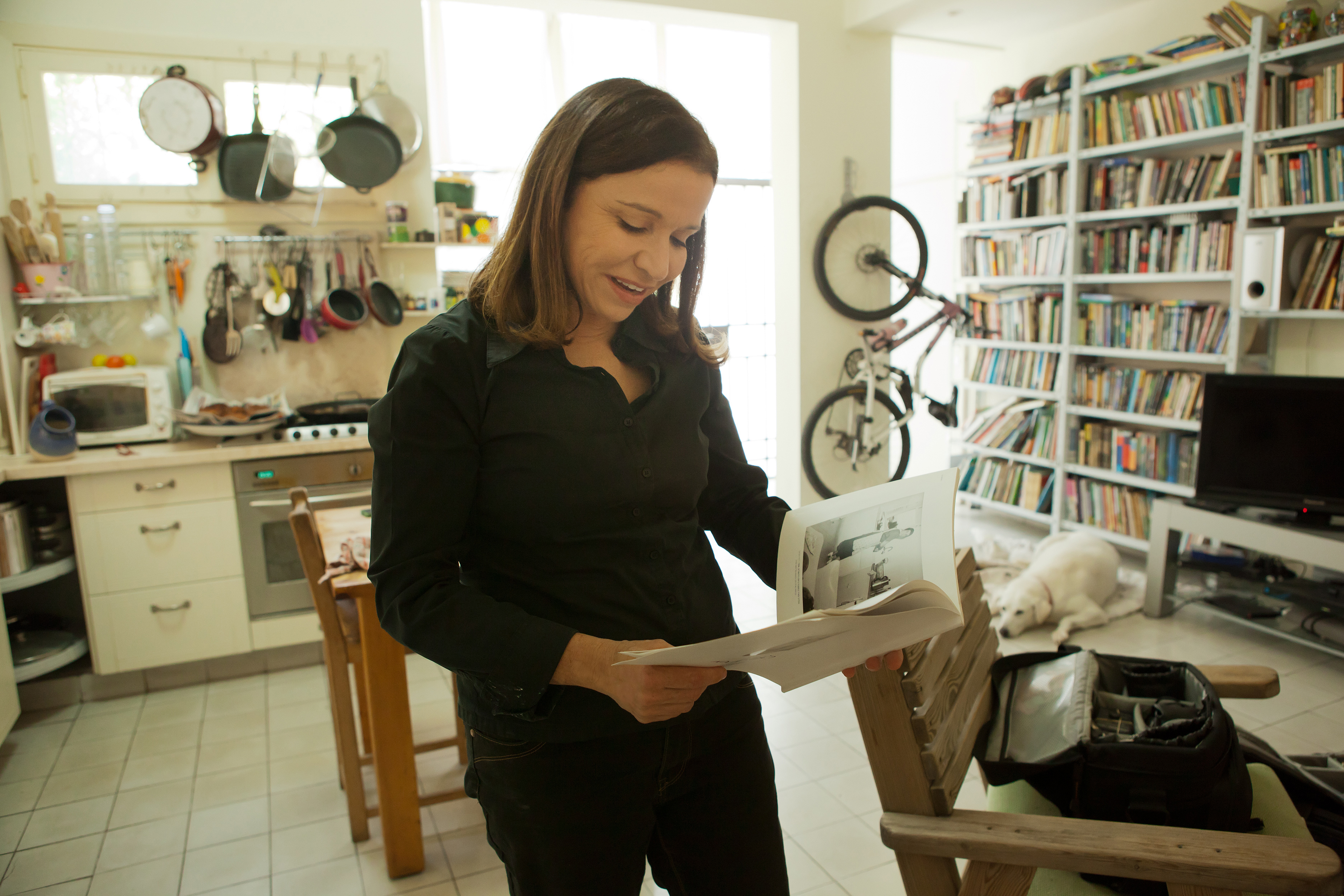
Yachimovich at her apartment in Tel Aviv, 2011

She lives in Kerem HaTeimanim neighborhood in central Tel Aviv with her two children, Gal and Rama, in a 78 square meters apartment. A feminist, Yachimovich reportedly refused to marry under the rabbinate religious authority. After getting divorced, she maintains good relations with her ex-husband, Noam Ziv, to whom she dedicated her last book.

She published her apartment's worth, her mortgage loan worth and previous income figures, in order to promote increased transparency of elected officials' interests. Claiming she has nothing to hide, Yachimovich challenged all Members of Knesset to publish their own financial standing.

Besides her native language, Hebrew, she speaks English and Polish.

Yachimovich is an atheist. On Judaism, she says "My Judaism is one of identity: I am part of a family and part of a people with a shared fate, history, culture and customs. My extended (ultra-Orthodox) family was destroyed in the Holocaust and my parents who survived were angry at God and felt betrayed. Paradoxically, even though I have a much more conciliatory attitude and harbor no resentment toward religion, and feel connected to the sources on the social level – their anger contained much greater faith. To be totally honest, I turn to God in times of trouble, just in case. He helps, and then like an ingrate, I return to my secularism."

== See also ==
- List of Israeli politicians

Political offices
Preceded by Shaul Mofaz	Leader of the Opposition; 2012	Succeeded by Shaul Mofaz
Preceded by Shaul Mofaz	Leader of the Opposition; 2013	Succeeded by Isaac Herzog
Preceded by Tzipi Livni	Leader of the Opposition; 2019	Succeeded by Benny Gantz (de facto)
Party political offices
Preceded by Ehud Barak	Leader of the Israeli Labor Party; 2011–13	Succeeded by Isaac Herzog
