= Barack (name) =

Barack, also spelled Barak or Baraq, is a given name of Arabic origin. From the Semitic root B-R-K, it means "blessed" and is most commonly used in its feminine form Baraka(h).

The Semitic root is derived from B-R-Q (Hebrew: ב־ר־ק; Arabic: ب-ر-ق), meaning "lightning". Some identify similarities to other Hebrew root words. However, given the specific pronunciation of the name "Barrack" and the extensive history of Masoretic linguistics, reference to other roots inevitably result in distinctly different names.

In Islamic mysticism, Barakah (Arabic: بركة) is a concept of spiritual presence or revelation.

The Arabic masculine given name Mubarak is the Arabic stem III passive participle, mubārak (مبارك), meaning "blessed (one)".

The name is cognate with the Amharic given name ብሩክ ("Biruk").

== People with the given name ==
- Barack Adama (born 1985), a French rapper
- Barack Obama (born 1961), former US president
- Barack Obama Sr. (1936–1982), father of Barack Obama and Kenyan economist

== People with the surname ==
- Ghiyas-ud-din Baraq (1266–1271), a Khan of the Chagatai Khanate
- Moisés Barack (1943–2024), a Peruvian footballer

== Fictional characters ==
- The protagonist of Barack the Barbarian, a comic book series

== See also ==
- Arabic name
- Barrack (disambiguation) § People
- Barak (given name)
- Barak (surname)
- Burak (name)
- Burack
- Baraka (disambiguation) § People
- Mubarak (name)
