= Brach (surname) =

Brach is a surname of multiple origins.

- Brad Brach (born 1986), American baseball player
- Emil J. Brach (1859–1947) American businessman
- François-Louis de Brach (1668–1739), French Navy officer
- Gérard Brach (1927–2006), French screenwriter
- Helen Brach (1911–1977)
- Jean François Louis de Brach (1668–1739), French naval officer
- Julius Brach (1881–1938), Czech chess master
- Paul Brach, (1924–2007), American abstract painter
- Philippe Brach, stage name of Philippe Bouchard (born 1989), Canadian singer-songwriter
- Tara Brach (born 1953), American psychologist and author

== See also ==
- Barach
- Broch
