= NiCE =

CX company in Hoboken, NJ

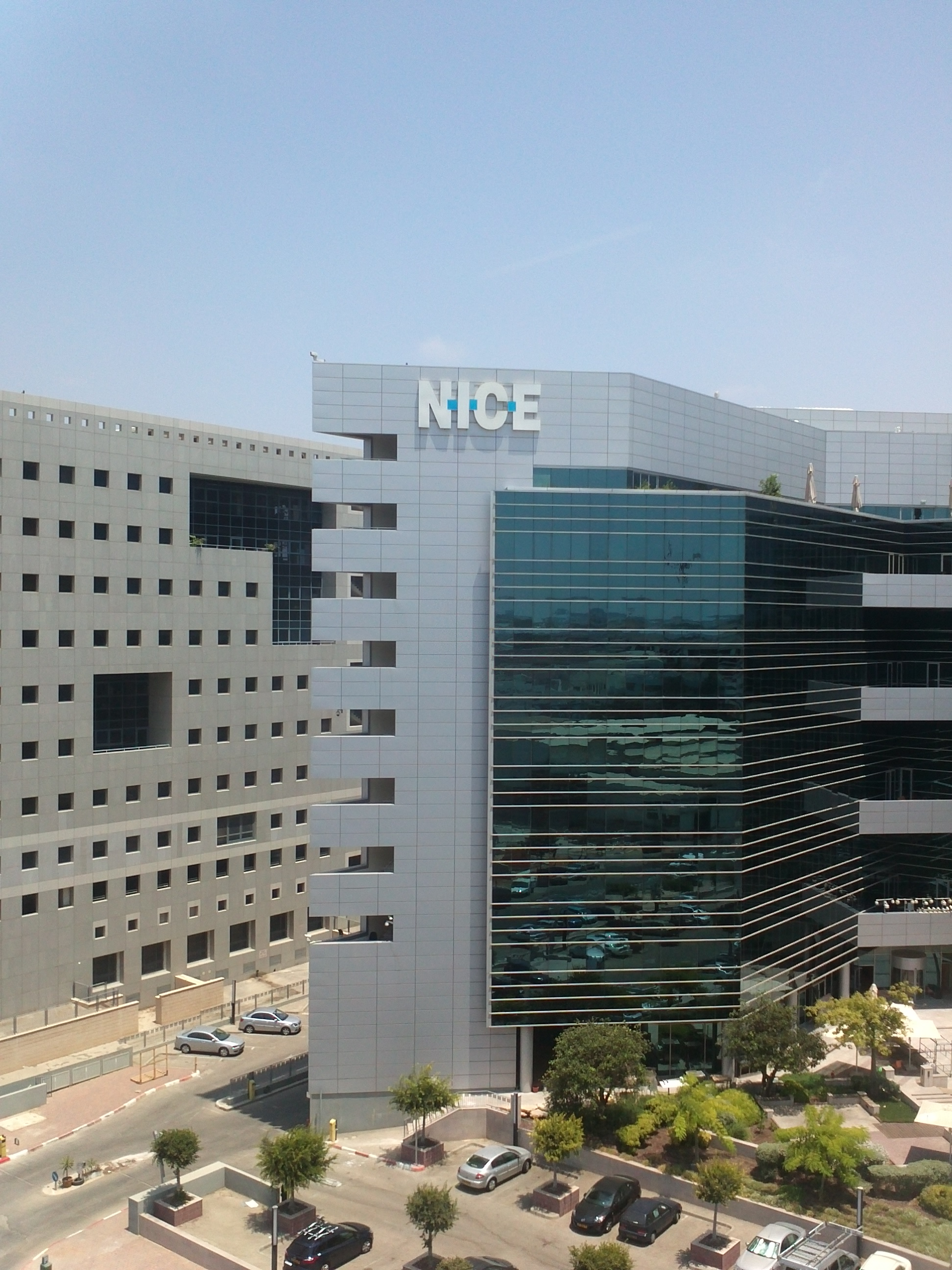
- NiCE headquarters, Ra'anana, Israel
- Type: Public
- Traded as: Nasdaq: NICE; TASE: NICE
- Industry: Software
- Founded: 1986; 40 years ago
- Headquarters: Hoboken, New Jersey, United States
- Key people: David Kostman (chairman); Scott Russell (CEO)
- Products: NiCE CXone, NiCE Actimize, CXone Mpower, Cognigy
- Services: Customer experience software, contact-center software, workforce engagement management, anti-money laundering software
- Revenue: ▲$2.8 billion (2024)
- Operating income: ▲$290 million (2022)
- Net income: ▲$225 million (2022)
- Number of employees: 8,400 (2024)
- Subsidiaries: NiCE Systems Ltd. NiCE Systems Inc. Nexidia; NiCE Actimize Ltd. NiCE Vision; NiCE CXone
- Website: nice.com

NiCE is an American technology company specializing in customer relations management software (NiCE CXone), artificial intelligence, and digital and workforce engagement management.

The company was first listed on the NASDAQ stock exchange in 1996.

== History ==
NiCE was founded in 1986 as Neptune Intelligence Computer Engineering (NICE) in Israel; later, on October 14, 1991, the Company was renamed NICE Systems Ltd with the acronym no longer in active use.

Much of the early technology developed by NiCE was for contact centers, financial services and business intelligence markets. The computer engineers that founded NiCE created a telephony voice recording system in the early 90s, followed by ATM software under the subsidiary NICECom. The ATM vendor quickly grew its operations in the 90s and NiCE sold its subsidiary to 3Com in 1994 for $54 million. In 2007, NiCE acquired Actimize for $280 million. The company developed risk management software for various markets.

In 2011, NiCE acquired UK-based Fizzback with the value of the deal said to be $80 million. The UK company specialized in customer feedback, collecting real-time customer experience information. At the time of acquisition, Fizzback processed 150 million individual feedback reports; many of these reports were taken from social media platforms. During the same year, NiCE announced the acquisition of analytics firm, Merced Systems for $150 million. Merced was a provider of performance management services, offered predominantly as software as a service with additional analytics and workforce optimization.

In 2014, Zeevi Bregman left his role as CEO, to be replaced by Barak Eilam who previously served as President, a role he had held for 18 months before becoming CEO.

NiCE relocated its headquarters to a new 60,000 square foot office building on the Hudson River waterfront in 2015.

The physical security business unit (NICE Security) was sold to private equity firm Battery Ventures in September 2015 and changed its name to Qognify. Qognify has since been acquired by Hexagon AB in 2023.

On June 6, 2016, the company was renamed NiCE Ltd and acquired inContact for a reported $960 million. Paul Jarman of inContact would continue as CEO to lead the inContact division once integrated into NiCE.

In 2018, NiCE acquired The Mattersight Corporation that was founded as a behavioral analytics software company in 1994, before expanding into cloud analytics and its SaaS offering. The agreed deal was $90 million, which made the total acquisition price 25% above share value. Mattersight's service offering was integrated into NiCE.

In May 2019, NiCE acquired Brand Embassy.

In April 2021, it was announced that NiCE would be acquiring MindTouch, a San Diego–based knowledge management company founded in 2005. NICE rebranded the platform as CXone Expert. In 2021, growth in numerous tech sectors led to NiCE receiving a valuation of $17 billion, making it the most valuable company in Israel. During the same period, the company partnered with Google Cloud.

In June 2023, NiCE was recognized by Frost & Sullivan with its 2023 Best Practices Company of the Year Award for Conversational AI.

In June 2024, it was announced that its CEO Barak Eilam would be stepping down from his role as chief executive officer at the end of 2024. Eilam would continue to be involved with NiCE during the first half of 2025, serving in a strategic consulting role for the software company. Just over a month after the announcement of Eilam's departure, former SAP executive Scott Russell was announced as his replacement. Russell would begin is role as CEO effective January 1, 2025. In Q3, NiCE announced a 13% year-on-year growth cloud service revenue.

NiCE updated CXone in late 2024, after which the company was described to be "well positioned" for growth in the CCaaS market. This included analysts at Cantor Fitzgerald, who had NiCE as one of their picks to benefit from the rise of AI use by corporations. The company completed the year by reporting strong financial results, with $2.7 billion total revenue from the Q4 2024 earnings.

In January 2025, NiCE announced plans to expand its anti–money laundering (AML) strategy globally, while market capitalization for the software firm had reached $10.49 billion. NiCE was in the media again later that month when its CXone platform helped Great Southern Bank dramatically cut waiting times. In early 2025, NiCE experienced a 6.16% single day rise in its share price. After starting his role as CEO, Scott Russell spoke about his plans and future expectations for NiCE. He stated in his first official interview as CEO with CX Today that the focus will remain on expansion and AI. During 2025, NiCE formed several partnerships with other technology firms. This included the May announcement with AWS, which made NiCE’s CXone CCaaS platform available on the AWS Marketplace. With a continued effort to grow its reach in AI, NiCE partnered with ServiceNow to provide an integrated platform.

In July 2025, NiCE announced that it would acquire the Düsseldorf-based provider of conversational and agentic AI software, Cognigy. Cognigy develops automation tools used in customer service operations, including its Cognigy.AI platform, which supports multilingual voice and chat interactions. NiCE stated that the technology would be integrated into its CXone platform while continuing to be offered as a standalone product. It also completed a rebrand around the same period, introducing a lower case "i" in its name. At the Interactions 2025 conference, CXone Mpower Agents were showcased for the first time as the corporation’s inaugural AI agent. Despite wider concerns about compute power and its affect on the environment, NiCE announced in late 2025 it had reduced its carbon intensity by 11% year-on-year. A number of new data center partners also met NiCE's remit that they needed to provide 100% renewable-sourced power.

The firm's financial results in February 2026, when it reported a 14% year-on-year growth in cloud revenue, surpassed investor expectations. As a result, shares jumped 10% following the announcement. As part of its ongoing role in the development of artificial intelligence technology, NiCE was recognized by numerous publications in early 2026 for its innovative approach to customer service. This included the March 2026 listing of Fast Company's Most Innovative Companies. At Nexus 2026, its Cognigy product announced a number of agentic breakthroughs. This included auto-generating AI agents, when a new use case was discovered.

At APCO 2026, the company introduced its latest product, NiCE Witness. It was developed for the emergency services market, and designed to keep an independent record of how AI and human staff work together during emergency incidents. It was presented by the company at the event as a "flight recorder" for emergency incidents, with the capability of sorting and prioritising emergency calls or supporting dispatchers. When it is integrated with NiCE Inform, it provides a full breakdown or report that can retrospectively provide evidence of exactly how conclusions or decisions were reached.

NiCE's earnings call for Q2 reported higher than expected revenues, following a strong quarterly performance for both CXone and CX AI products. This followed a number of international deals including HM Revenue & Customs in the UK it partnership with Capgemini. It would see the government institution utilize CXone across its client-facing services. This came as many organisations started to shift way from traditional contact center models with interactive voice response (IVR) systems. CXone was also implemented across Merlin Entertainment's sites, which include Legoland and Madame Tussauds.

In November 2026, Nice announced that it would be laying off 500 employees worldwide as a result of reorganization resulting from advancements in AI.

== Products and services ==
NiCE specializes in AI and customer experience (CX) software.

=== CXone ===
CXone is part of NiCE's product offering. In 2021, NiCE surpassed $1 billion in cloud revenue. In March 2023, the platform reached the milestone of having one million users.

In early 2023, NiCE announced conversational CX with ChatGPT-enabled CXone. CX Network magazine stated the offering would be ideal for contact centres where customers were unable to wait for callbacks due to the nature of their inquiry. After working with various regulatory bodies in the European Union, data centers, and also cloud providers, NiCE delivered a CX platform where all data passing through it would remain within the EU.

The platform provides customer service automation. In September 2024, it was announced NiCE was part of a $578 million deal to transform Services Australia. CXone Mpower received a significant update in October 2024.

In March 2025, NiCE announced the launch of CXone Orchestrator. It uses an AI agent to perform and assist in automating customer service tasks, and won Overall Best and Best Innovation in Customer Experience at Enterprise Connect 2025. In 2025, it secured a major deal with the UK’s Department for Work & Pensions, under which CXone would be deployed in a 40,000-seat agreement.

=== Cognigy ===
NiCE acquired Cognigy in 2025 for $955 million.

It has developed from its conversational base to become a major agentic AI provider in contact centers in both voice and digital channels. Enhancements during this enhancement have focused on accelerating the deployment of AI agents, including automated agent creation and improved orchestration between AI systems and human agents. This has been achieved through simulation with clearer evaluation of customer conversations for decision makers, which in turn leads to faster deployment.
