= The Barracks =

The Barracks may refer to:

== Buildings ==
- Barracks, buildings used to accommodate military personnel
- The Barracks, Petrie Terrace, a former police barracks in Brisbane, Australia
- The Barracks, Berwick-upon-Tweed or Ravensdowne Barracks, a former British Army site in England
- The Barracks, Brecon, a military installation in Wales
- The Barracks, Caernarfon, a military installation in Wales
- The Barracks, Cardiff a military installation in Cathays, Wales
- The Barracks, Chichester, a military installation in England
- The Barracks, Kingston upon Thames, a military installation in England
- The Barracks (Tarboro, North Carolina), a historic plantation house in Edgecombe County
- The Barracks (Virginia), a prisoner of war camp near Charlottesville

== Other uses ==
- The Barracks (film), a 1999 Russian drama directed by Valeriy Ogorodnikov
- The Barracks (novel), a 1963 book by John McGahern

== See also ==
- Barrack (disambiguation)
