= Naamin Timoyco =

Peruvian dancer and vedette (born 1959)

- Born: December 22, 1959 (age 66); Iquitos, Peru
- Education: Inca Garcilaso de la Vega University
- Occupations: Vedette; dancer

Naamin Cárdenas Calderón (born December 22, 1959), known artistically as Naamin Timoyco, is a Peruvian vedette and dancer. Naamin was the first Peruvian trans woman to obtain a National Identity Document that legally recognizes her gender identity.

== Biography ==
She was born on December 22, 1959, in the district of Iquitos, in the province of Maynas. Her father was in the military and her mother was a housewife. At the age of 15, after finishing basic education in school, she moved to the city of Lima.

From an early age, she showed interest in the entertainment world. At 18, she began studying a degree in business administration at Inca Garcilaso de la Vega University, during which time she began to stand out as a dancer in gatherings with friends in nightclubs. It was at the well-known Perseo nightclub where her talent stood out even more, winning a prestigious dance contest. Following this victory, the club owners invited her to join the cast of their shows, marking the beginning of her successful career as a dancer and vedette.

After several years working in her university profession, she decided to dedicate herself professionally to the nightlife show scene as a vedette, choosing her stage name in honor of the Argentine dancer Naanim Timoyko. In the 1990s, she traveled to Paris to undergo sex reassignment surgery.

In 2003, she began legal procedures to change her name on her national identity document, achieving success in 2008 when the Sixteenth Civil Court of Lima declared her request to be recognized as a woman in her birth certificate to be well-founded. In 2010, the 39th Specialized Civil Court of Lima issued a ruling for the National Registry of Identification and Civil Status (RENIEC) to process the change in its database. On July 15, 2011, she was notified of the issuance of her new DNI.

== Filmography ==
=== Television ===
- Los reyes del playback
- El artista del año

== See also ==
- Coco Marusix
