= Barać =

Barać is a South Slavic surname. Notable people with the name include:

- Ante Barać (born 1980), Croatian footballer
- Antonio Barać (born 1997), Croatian racing cyclist
- Boris Barać (born 1992), Croatian basketball player
- Marko Barać (born 1989), Serbian basketball coach
- Mateo Barać (born 1994), Croatian footballer
- Pankracije Barać (born 1981), Croatian basketball player
- Samir Barać (born 1973), Croatian water polo player
- Stanko Barać (born 1986), Croatian basketball player
- Verica Barać (1955–2012), Serbian lawyer

== See also ==
- Caves of Barać
- Barac (disambiguation)
