= Brach =

Brach may refer to:

- Brach, Gironde, France
- Brach's, American confectionery manufacturer
- Brach (surname)

== See also ==
- Brač, Croatia
- Broch
