= Causata =

American enterprise software company

- Type: Private
- Industry: customer experience management software Marketing automation
- Founded: 2009
- Headquarters: San Mateo, California, USA; London, UK
- Key people: Paul Wahl
- Products: Software application Computer software
- Website: www.causata.com @Causata

Causata is an enterprise software company based in San Mateo, California, United States with development offices in London, England, UK. It provides software which is used by business-to-consumer marketers to manage interactions with customers. The company launched the fourth version of its products in February, 2013.

== Corporate history ==
Causata was founded in 2009 by Paul Phillips and opened its first office in London, England, UK. The company opened its San Mateo, California office in 2011. CEO Paul Wahl, a former CEO of SAP America and former COO of Siebel Systems, joined the company in March 2012. Causata has received $23 million in venture funding from Accel Partners London, the Series C round coming in Feb. 2013.

In 2013, Causata was acquired by NiCE Systems.

== Products ==
Causata's software uses HBase, the NoSQL database on the Hadoop Distributed File System. It has industry-specific applications for cross-sell, acquisition, and retention to enable marketers to personalize web and mobile interfaces, operate email and mobile messaging campaigns, enable targeted advertising and create context-driven sales and service.

- The Identity Graph algorithms use first-party online and offline customer data to combine customers' identities and event timelines.
- The Predictive Profile compares individual customer paths and histories against each other to predict customer intent. Machine learning algorithms based on reinforcement methodologies build real-time predictive analytics models for individual customers.
- Decisioning serves targeted offers, promotions and ads to potential customers, based on information gathered by the previously mentioned analysis.
