= Barącz =

Barącz is a Polish-language surname of Armenian origin (Armenian: Բարոնչ, romanized: Baronch). In Austria-Hungary the name was also spelled as Baroncz. Notable people with the surname include:

- Sadok Barącz (1814–1892), Galician (Austria-Hungary) Dominican friar, historian, folklorist, and archivist of Armenian descent
- Tadeusz Barącz (1849–1905), Polish sculptor
- Roman Barącz (1856–1930) surgeon, otorhinolaryngologist, professor at the Faculty of Medicine of Lviv University, and collector

== See also ==
- Barach
