= Barak Eilam =

Israeli computer programmer

- ברק עילם
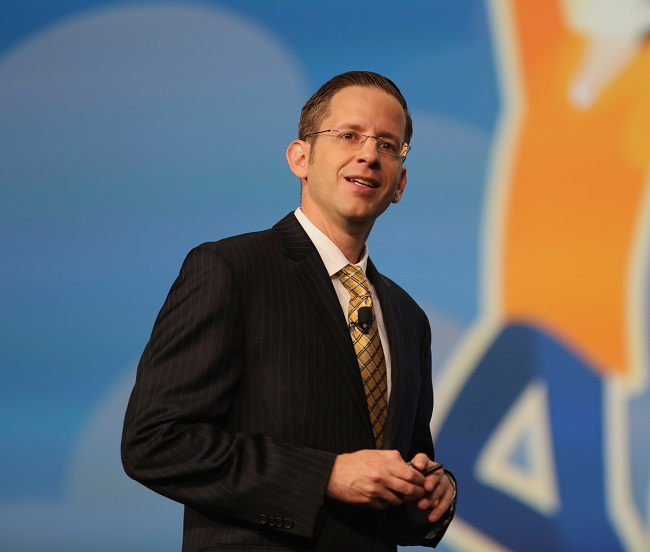
- Born: Barak Eilam; Tel Aviv, Israel
- Education: Tel Aviv University
- Occupation: CEO
- Years active: 2014-2024
- Employer: NICE Ltd.

Barak Eilam (Hebrew: ברק עילם) is an American–Israeli executive. He was the chief executive officer of NICE (NASDAQ:NICE) He became the CEO in 2014, after spending over 15 years with the company. Eilam led the transformation and strategy of evolving NICE into a cloud enterprise software company. This transition was achieved through organic innovations as well as acquisitions of multiple companies of businesses, as well as the divestiture of a number of subsidiaries to focus the company on cloud and analytics. These strategic moves drove the company's accelerated growth in the last 7 years. On May 16, 2024, it was announced that Eilam would resign from NICE by 31 December.

Eilam's strategy and execution has led to a substantial rise in the company valuation and its share price between 2014 and the present day, supported by many investment banks. While CEO of NICE, Eilam has won multiple awards for his achievements including some in his country of birth, Israel.

== Education and early life ==
Eilam served as an officer in the Israel Defense Forces intelligence corps for six years. He has been working in various positions at NICE since he left the army in 1999. He studied at the Tel Aviv University, and received a BSc in Electrical Engineering. He also attended executive leadership programs at INSEAD Business School in France.

== Career ==
Eilam started his career as an engineer at NICE in 1999 and he held multiple senior roles in R&D, product management and sales. Later, he became Vice President of the Interaction Analytics Group, an extension of NICE. Eilam established and led the company's Analytics business, spearheading NICE's transformation into an enterprise software company. Prior to becoming the CEO, Eilam served as the President of NICE Americas, expanding NICE's customer base.

Eilam was announced as the CEO in 2014. Following the announcement, David Kustman as chairman of the board stated, "Barak has proven success in establishing business units and achieving results, and has made a significant contribution to NICE's growth. During his career he has demonstrated a high ability to lead organizations, including product and sales teams, to introduce new technologies and foster innovation." When Eilam was announced as the CEO, many Israeli newspapers stated that NICE was one of the largest Israeli companies to be floated on the NASDAQ.

This led the company to acquire a number of companies, mainly based in the United States. This included the cloud-based customer service provider, inContact, based in Utah. The acquisition was the largest in the history of NICE and completely repositioned the company. According to Fortuneit allowed the company to focus more on mid-market, but also on large financial companies to integrate their existing product range. The acquisition was for a total of $940 million.

They also acquired analytics firm Nexidia for $135 million during a similar period. This was seen by many in the media as Eilam further repositioning the company into the customer interaction analytics market. In late 2017, the company also announced the acquisition of workforce analytical software provider, WorkFlex. Previous acquisitions such as Causata enabled NICE to have a diversified portfolio of analytical products. The ongoing acquisitions and strategic realignment meant the stock price of the company also grew by 27% between 2017 and 2018.

In 2018, Eilam and NICE acquired Mattersight Corporation for a total of $90 million. The company which was a SaaS-based enterprise behavioral analytics software provider, became a subsidiary product offering of NICE following the acquisition. During the same year, NICE and Eilam posted a number of positive results regarding company growth. These results were mainly focused on two of the company's cloud platforms, CXone and X-Sight.

Since becoming the CEO of NICE, the company has regularly posted strong financial results. Towards the end of 2018, Eilam was interviewed on CNBC, speaking about the success of NICE and the growth it has experienced over recent years. Eilam stated that since he had become CEO, the company had experienced a fivefold total addressable market growth in a little over four years at the helm of the company.

Eilam outlined a strategy on how NICE would further expand in the coming years. He believed that by increasing the quality of analytics across all sectors of the business, for both internal and customer requirements, it would create more efficient software. He expected NICE to reach a turnover of $2 billion in a short timeframe, with an operating margin of 30%. By the end of 2020 the market cap of NICE reached new record high. Shared price reached $275, representing a 7-fold increase since he became a CEO.

In July 2021, Eilam announced that NICE would be acquiring British-based ContactEngine for an undisclosed sum. It further pushed NICE's focus on AI, with ContactEngine having the ability to anticipate customer questions and reach out proactively in certain situations with outbound texts. NICE soon after launched CXone SmartReach, which included the technology acquired as part of the ContactEngine deal. In September 2022, Eilam wrote for FastCompany about the progression of measuring customer experience. He was also interviewed by Calcalist in mid-2022, explaining that NICE had "$1.5 billion in our account," which he felt gave NICE an advantage with acquisitions as many competitors would have to fund large deals with debt. During the earnings report for the fourth quarter of 2022, Eilam confirmed that NICE Ltd. had reached its target of surpassing $2 billion in annual revenue. He stated that this was partly down to a continued growth in of the AI adoption and automation. Throughout the entire financial year of 2022, the NICE share price increased 17%.

In May 2023, Eilam spoke to Sky News about the importance of AI and how it is likely to impact customer service in the future. A month later, he was a keynote speaker at NICE's Interactions 2023 event. During the event, the future of artificial intelligence was discussed, again focusing on how it impacts the CX industry. He likened AI to a "CX alchemist conjuring up a completely new world of possibilities of how technology and customer service can be melded together."

On May 16, 2024, Eilam announced he will step down from his role as CEO by the end of the year. In February of 2025 it was announced that Eilam had joined Payoneer as a director.

== Personal life ==
Eilam lives in New Jersey with his two daughters, wife, and cat.

== Accolades ==
- Globes – People of the Year, 22nd (2014)
- People & Computers magazine – CEO of the Year (2015)
- Calcalist – 50 best managers, 7th (2019)
- Calcalist – 50 best managers, 1st (2020)
