= Barracking =

Barracking may refer to:

- Crowd abuse - the meaning of "barracking" in most of the world
- Cheering - the predominant meaning of "barracking" in Australia and New Zealand
