= Berek =

Berek may refer to:

== Places ==
- Berek, Croatia, a municipality
- Berek (Gradiška), village in Republika Srpska, Bosnia and Herzegovina

== People ==
In Polish, Berek is a diminutive of the names Baruch or Ber, and later a name in its own right.

- Berek Freiberg, better known as Dov Freiberg (1927–2008), Polish Jewish Holocaust survivor, writer, and witness at the Eichmann trial and the Demjanjuk case
- Berek Joselewicz (1764–1809), Polish Jewish colonel of the Polish Army
- Berek Lajcher (1893–1943), Polish Jewish physician and social activist, officer of the Polish Army
- Jan Berek (1896–1986), Polish army officer
- Jonathan Berek, Professor and Chair of the Department of Obstetrics and Gynecology at Stanford University School of Medicine
- Katalin Berek (1930–2017), Hungarian actress
- Michael Berek, East German slalom canoeist
- Peter Berek, Professor of English and Shakespearean scholar at Amherst College

== Fictional characters ==
- Berek Halfhand, from The Chronicles of Thomas Covenant series
