= Inca Garcilaso de la Vega University =

Peruvian university

- Universidad Inca Garcilaso de la Vega
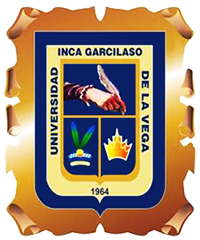
- Motto: Spanish: Nuevos tiempos, nuevas ideas
- Motto in English: New times, new ideas
- Type: Private
- Established: 1964
- Chancellor: Willian Esteban Chu Estrada
- Undergraduates: 16 650
- Location: Lima, Peru; 12°04′58″S 77°06′17″W
- Locations: 6 campuses
- Colours: Blue; Yellow
- Website: www.uigv.edu.pe
- Location within Peru

The Inca Garcilaso de la Vega University (Spanish: Universidad Inca Garcilaso de la Vega, UIGV) is a private university located in the city of Lima, Peru. Founded on December 21, 1964, during the first government of President Fernando Belaúnde Terry. It is currently in the period of cessation of activities due to the fact that the Superintendencia Nacional de Educación Superior Universitaria (SUNEDU) denied his licensing.

== History ==
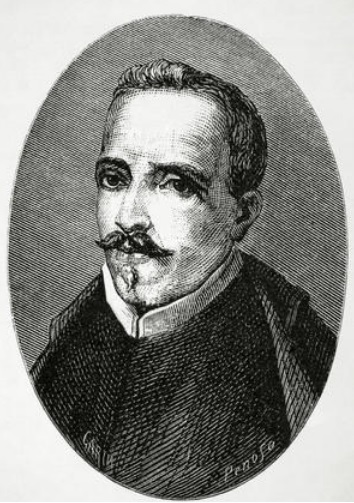
Portrait of Inca Garcilaso de la Vega, writer and historian of Hispanic-Inca descent

The Inca Garcilaso de la Vega University was created in December 1964 by Supreme Decree No. 74 and 26-A. It took the name of the Inca Garcilaso de la Vega, a writer and historian of Hispanic-Inca descent considered the "first biological and spiritual mestizo of America".

Initially the university functioned as a pedagogical university, then having six faculties, but over the years it expanded its educational offer reaching a total of ten faculties that taught seventeen undergraduate degrees. In 1992, it began its undergraduate study program distance learning, and in 2010 it opened a graduate school that offered up to fifteen master's degrees and seven doctoral programs.

Currently, the university has thirteen faculties and one graduate school. In total, it offers 48 undergraduate degrees, 38 master's degrees, and 11 doctorates, in addition to 24 second-specialty programs.

On October 10, 2019, the Superintendencia Nacional de Educación Superior Universitaria (Sunedu) denied his licensing due to non-compliance with various basic quality conditions. For this reason, the university must cease its activities within a period of two years, counted from the following academic semester.

In May 2020, Sunedu extended to five years (three additional) the deadline for the cessation of academic activities of all universities with a denied license, due to the COVID-19 pandemic. However, during this period said houses of study will not be able to carry out admission processes.

== Organization ==
=== Campus ===
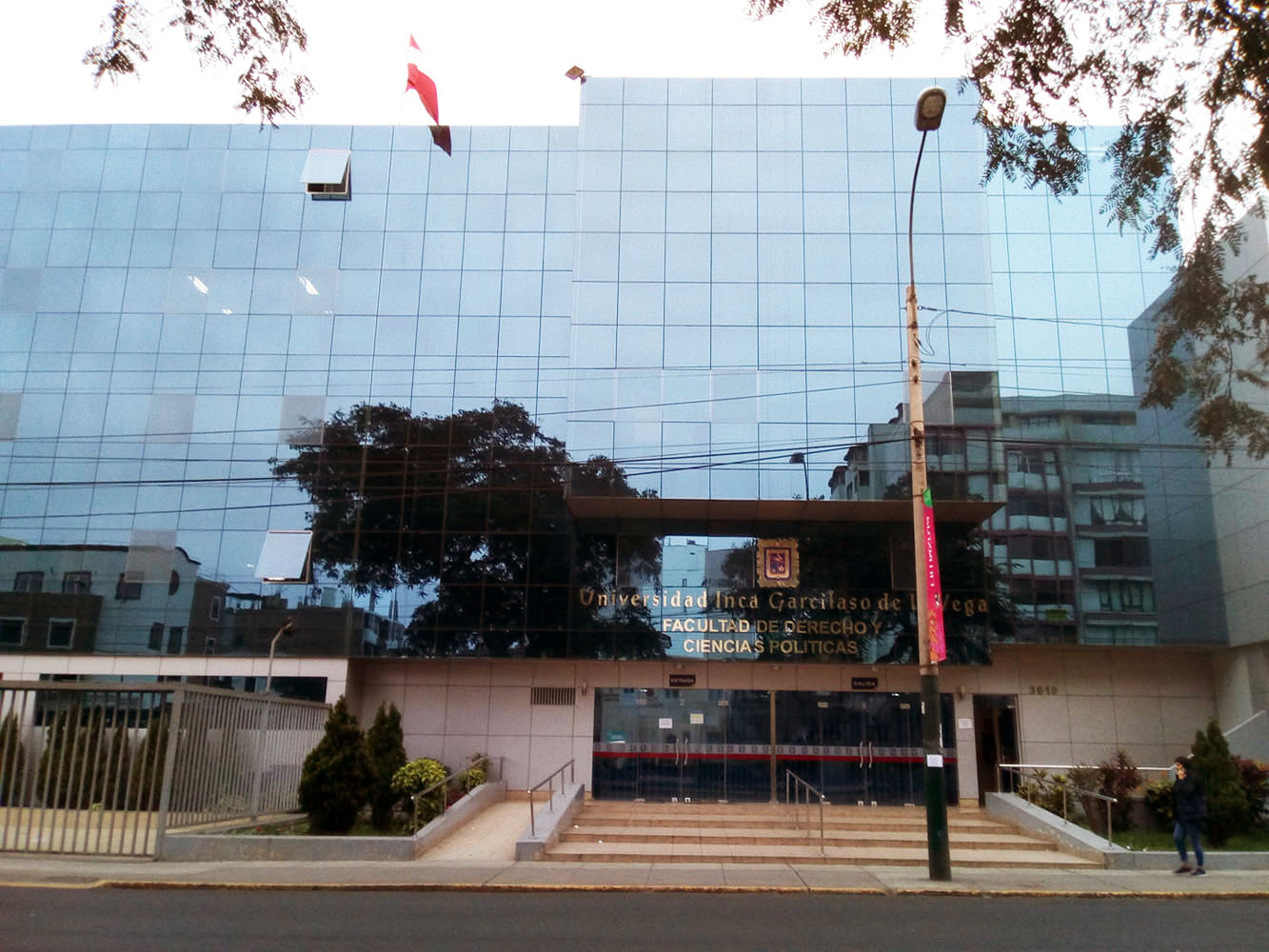
School of Law and Political Science

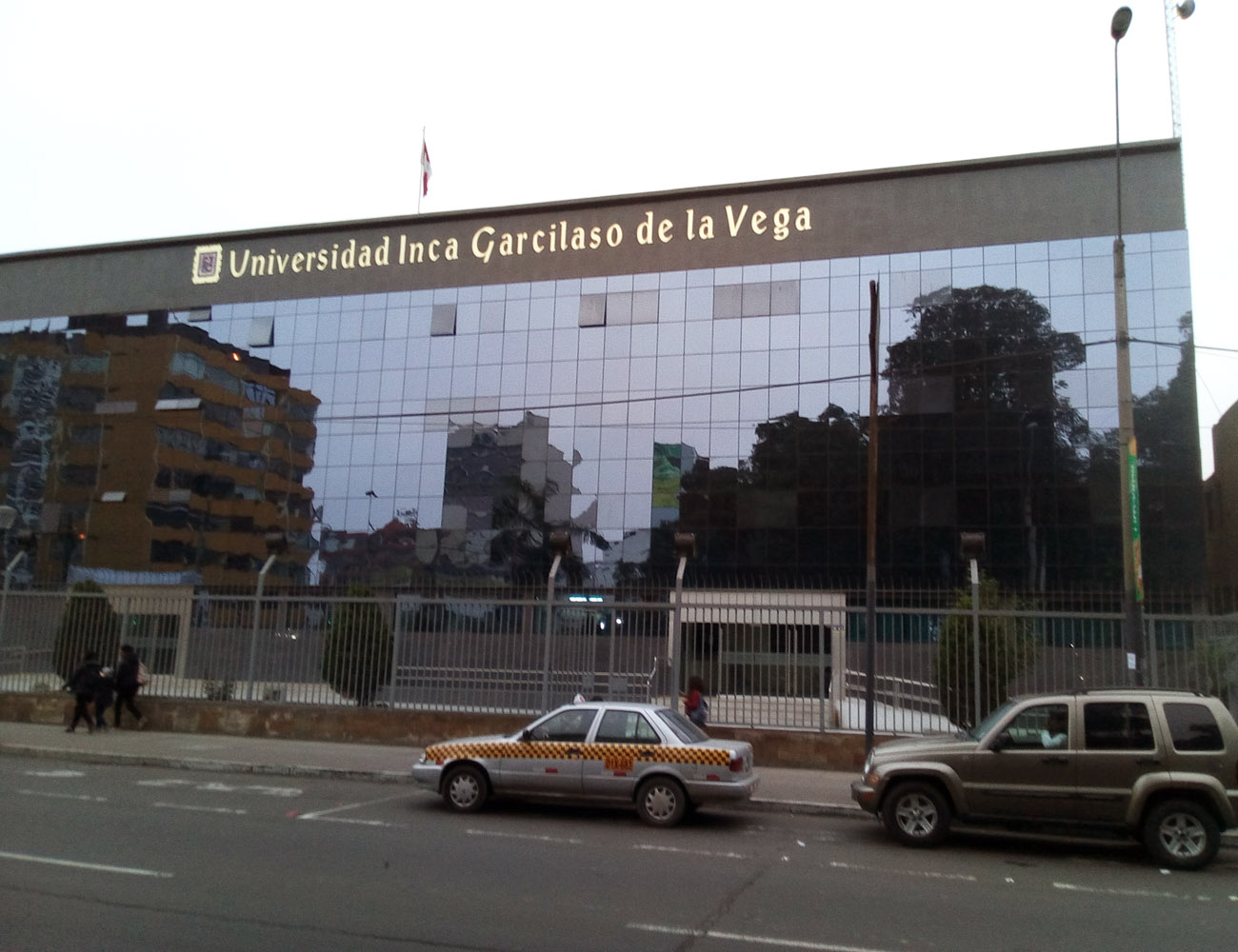
School of Administrative Sciences

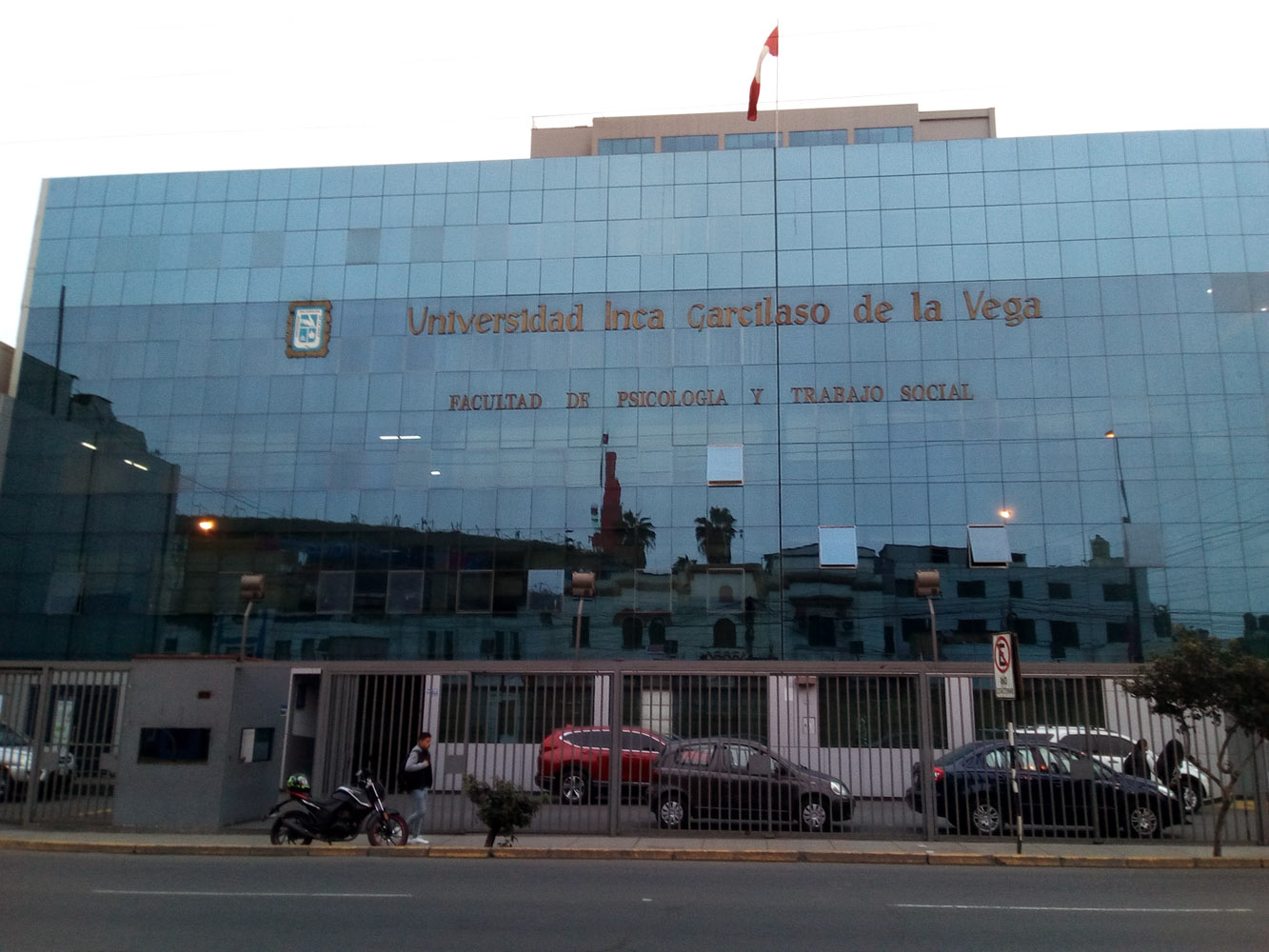
School of Psychology and Social Work

The Inca Garcilaso de la Vega University had six campuses (two in Santa Beatriz and two in Pueblo Libre) in the city of Lima, which ceased their activities due to the coronavirus pandemic (COVID-19) and because it is in the liquidation process.

=== Academic areas ===
- School of Administrative Sciences
  - Administrative Sciences
- School of Pharmaceutical and Biochemical Sciences
  - Pharmaceutical and Biochemical Sciences
- School of Foreign Trade and International Relations
  - Port and Customs Management
  - International Logistics
  - International Relations and Negotiations
- School of Law and Political Science
  - Law
- School of Nursing
  - Nursing
- School of Stomatology
  - Stomatology
- School of Administrative and Industrial Engineering
  - Engineering management
  - Industrial engineering
- School of Psychology and Social Work
  - Psychology
  - Social Work
- School of Medical technology
  - Physical therapy and Rehabilitation

== Notable alumni ==
- Napoleón Becerra† (politician, trade unionist, and presidential candidate)
- Luis Alva Castro, (economist, former Vice President, former Prime Minister)
- Valia Barak (journalist and TV presenter)
- María Teresa Cabrera (lawyer, former Congresswoman)
- Omar Chehade (lawyer, Congressman)
- Arlette Contreras (lawyer, activist, Congresswoman, included in the TIME 100 list of the most influential people)
- José Lecaros (lawyer, President of the Supreme Court)
- Ana Rosa Liendo (actress, storyteller and radio host)
- Agustín Mantilla† (economist, sociologist, former Congressman and Minister of the Interior)
- Daniel Maurate (lawyer, former Minister of Labor and Employment Promotion)
- Carlos Morán (lawyer, General in retreat of the National Police of Peru, former Minister of the Interior)
- Álvaro Ugaz† (journalist and TV presenter)
- Vicente Zeballos (lawyer, former President of the Council of Ministers)
- César Zumaeta (economist, former Congressman and President of the Congress)
- Naamin Timoyco Peruvian vedette and dancer

== See also ==
- Education in Peru
- List of universities in Peru
