= Burack =

Burack is a surname. Notable people with the surname include:

- Ahron Dovid Burack (1892–1960), Lithuanian-American rabbi
- Zahava Burack (1932–2001), American philanthropist

== See also ==
- Barack (name)
