= Zahava Burack =

Polish-American activist and Holocaust survivor

Zahava Burack at a 1986 ceremony in honor of the Macugowski family.

Zahava Burack (née Radza, December 14, 1932 – September 28, 2001) was a Jewish Holocaust survivor from Poland who went on to become a well-known philanthropist, community leader and political activist in the United States. During her childhood, she survived the Holocaust by hiding with her family in a crawlspace beneath the home of a Polish Catholic family for two and a half years. After the liberation of occupied Poland in 1945, she was smuggled to Israel, where she lived for twelve years, two of which she spent serving with the Haganah paramilitary organization. In 1958, Burack moved to the United States, where she worked with both American and Israeli politicians for Jewish causes.

== Surviving the Holocaust ==
Zahava Burack was born in 1932 in the shtetl of Nowy Korczyn, Poland, to Louis and Gitla Radza. Louis was a juice manufacturer. Burack had three sisters, Rita, Miriam and Sarah.

In 1942, at the age of 9, Burack, her parents, and her sisters Miriam and Sarah were forced into hiding after German soldiers instructed the Jewish residents of Nowy Korczyn to march to the railway station for "relocation." Her parents, aware that this was a euphemism for deportation to concentration camps, slipped out of the line unseen to escape. In the confusion, her older sister Rita became separated from the family and boarded the train; she was eventually taken to the Bergen-Belsen concentration camp.

The Radza family sought refuge with a Polish Catholic family, Stephania and Jozef Macugowski. Jozef was an old friend of Louis Radza's, and had previously offered assistance if the family ever required it. To hide the Radza family, the Macugowskis dug a secret trench beneath the floorboards of their home. The crawlspace was no more than 5 feet (1.5 m) wide, 7 ft (2.1 m) long, and 20 inches (51 cm) deep. The family would spend the next two and a half years hidden within, their presence a secret not only from the outside world, but from the Macugowskis' children and elderly parents as well.

Over that span of time, several other Jewish people sought refuge with the Macugowskis. Eventually, nine refugees, including a cousin of the Radzas, were packed inside. Much later, Burack's sister Miriam described their packed state to reporters: "When one turned on his side, the others would have to do the same. We were like sardines." The Macugowskis would come down at night to bring the family bread, water, and a bucket for waste. The Radzas, despairing their situation, sometimes begged them for poisoned food or a gun to end their misery, but the Macugowskis refused. Burack later recalled that they insisted, "As long as we are alive, we will save you.'' On one occasion, Jozef brought the family unleavened bread so they could observe the Jewish Passover.

In 1945, the German High Command took over the Macugowskis house as a local headquarters and forced the Macugowskis out. According to Burack's recollection, the Radzas took out their prayer book, said Kaddish, the Jewish prayer for the dead, and "all thanked God that we were going to die." However, the Macugowskis were able to convince the German soldiers that they should be allowed to stay on as the home's caretakers. Once or twice a week, after waiting until all the German soldiers were asleep, Jozef and Stephania were able to bring a small amount of supplies for the family.

At one point, the Germans in the house were overheard discussing efforts to track down one remaining Jewish family rumored to still be hidden in town. Jozef was able to spread a rumor in a nearby town that this family had drowned in the Wista River while fleeing the Nazis, and the search was called off.

== Liberation and move to Israel ==
In 1945, the town was liberated by the Red Army. The Radza family, at last, emerged from the crawlspace beneath the Macugowskis' home. It was the first time they had seen daylight in two and a half years, and it burned their eyes at first. Their legs were so wobbly that Soviet soldiers believed they were drunk and beat them, thinking they were hiding vodka. Their vocal cords had atrophied because they had not spoken above a whisper during their entire confinement.

Jozef took the family to a town some miles away where no one knew them, and made them promise that they would never reveal who had protected them. Nearly six months after the war, the family was reunited with Rita, who had survived the camp at Bergen-Belsen. The Razdas eventually lost track of the Macugowskis.

Burack was given false identity papers that declared her a war orphan and, at no more than 12 years old, was smuggled into the part of Palestine that would soon become the state of Israel. She was the only member of her family to emigrate to Israel. Her family remained in Poland, visiting her occasionally at the girls' school where she lived. While living in Israel, she served in Haganah, the Jewish paramilitary organization. She remained in service when it became the Israel Defense Forces in 1948. She would ultimately remain in Israel for twelve years before emigrating to the United States.

== Political activism in the United States ==
After twelve years in Israel, Burack moved to the United States in 1958 to work for the Israeli Consulate in New York City. She eventually settled in Westchester County, New York, where she would marry Robert H. Burack. Burack's sisters had also settled in and around the New York area with their families. The Buracks split their time between Westchester and Palm Beach, Florida, for the remainder of their lives. They had one son, Jeffrey Burack. Through her adult life, Burack maintained her search for the Polish couple that had saved her and her family.

Burack was politically active for her entire adult life, and used her wealth philanthropically to further Jewish, Israeli, and Democratic Party causes. She was known as a political and social leader, and both "Israeli prime ministers and American presidents call[ed] on her for her political activism." She is known to have worked with the United Jewish Appeal, the Westchester-Putnam Boy Scouts of America Council, the Mental Health Association of Westchester County, and the David Yellin College of Education, among numerous others. She was the chairman of the board of Palm Beach Israel Bonds at the time of her death in 2001.

She met Jimmy Carter in 1975, before he was officially nominated as the Democratic Party candidate for the 1976 election, and later organized his election campaign in Westchester. Burack was a marcher at Carter's inauguration parade after he won the 1976 presidential election.

In 1981, Burack ran as a Democrat for a seat in Westchester County government, but was defeated by the Republican incumbent, John L. Messina, by 2,500 votes.

In 1984, Senator Joseph R. Pisani introduced a resolution to the New York State Senate to honor Burack for her long record of service to the Westchester community.

In 1986, Burack finally made contact with Stephania and Jozef Macugowski. In collaboration with the David Yellin College, Burack arranged for the Macugowskis to be flown to New York for a special recognition ceremony. The Polish couple was recognized as Righteous Among the Nations, an honorific given by the State of Israel to denote non-Jews who risked their lives to protect and shelter Jewish people during the Holocaust.

Zahava's husband Robert died in 1988. Zahava died from cancer on September 28, 2001.
