= Buraq, Iran =

Buraq بورق
- Village
- Location within Iran
- Coordinates: 31°32′46″N 53°46′58″E
- Country: Iran
- Province: Yazd
- County: Taft
- Bakhsh: Central
- Rural District: Dehshir

Population (2006)
  - Total: 94
- Time zone: UTC+3:30 (IRST)
  - Summer (DST): UTC+4:30 (IRDT)

Buraq (Persian: بورق, also Romanized as Būraq) is a village in Dehshir Rural District, in the Central District of Taft County, Yazd Province, Iran. At the 2006 census, its population was 94, in 32 families.
