= Barrack (disambiguation) =

Barracks are buildings built to house military personnel or laborers.

Barrack may also refer to:

== People ==
- Romana Barrack (1928–2016), English television writer
- Thomas J. Barrack Jr. (born 1947), American real estate investor

== Other uses ==
- Hay barrack, an open structure for storing loose hay
- Jack M. Barrack Hebrew Academy, a school in Pennsylvania, U.S.
- Barrack (video game), by Ambrosia Software

== See also ==
- Barracking (disambiguation)
- Barack (disambiguation)
- Barak (disambiguation)
- Baraq (disambiguation)
- The Barracks (disambiguation)
