= Barack (disambiguation) =

Barack Obama is an American politician who served as President of the United States from 2009 to 2017.

Barack may also refer to:

- Barack (name), including a list of people with the name
- Barack (brandy), a Hungarian apricot brandy

== See also ==
- Barac (disambiguation)
- Barak (disambiguation)
- Barrack (disambiguation)
- Buraq (disambiguation)
- Burack
