= Dov (disambiguation) =

Dov is a Hebrew male given name.

DOV or Dov may also refer to:

- DOV Pharmaceutical
- Dover (Amtrak station), New Hampshire, United States; Amtrak station code DOV
- Dover Air Force Base, Delaware, United States
- Dover Corporation, stock exchange symbol DOV
- Dulwich OnView, a community-based online blog/magazine in Dulwich, London, UK
- German Eastern Marches Society; German: Deutscher Ostmarkenverein
- A type of pulsating white dwarf
