= Crowd abuse =

Abusive behaviour by sports event spectators

Crowd abuse or barracking is the practice of crowds following various sports to criticise or abuse opponents, by shouting, chanting, singing or through the use of banners in the stadium. Motivation for crowd abuse includes gaining a psychological advantage over an opponent, either individually or as a team. Examples of the effectiveness of such techniques can be found in any major sport, including some dangerous outcomes such as the Malice at the Palace (Pacers-Pistons Brawl).

Malice at the Palace featured both physical and verbal crowd abuse, and contributed to many player's careers changing in the blink of an eye. Ron Artest was suspended for the rest of the season, stagnated on his basketball improvements, and was traded 16 games into the next season, ending the era of his Pacers team/dynasty. On December 8, 2004, five Pacers players and five fans were charged with assault and battery. All of the fans involved were banned from the Palace of Auburn Hills. Security at professional sports games changed drastically after the incident as well, with comments from players such as Jermaine O'Neal stating that "There was no security. You’re talking about one of the largest arenas in the NBA and you’re talking about...a large group in there that was literally trying to hurt us." Sekou Smith (NBA Writer, Indianapolis Star) stated "There was no security to keep people from jumping over that little rail and getting down to the floor." Due to the influence alcohol had on the situation, the NBA banned alcohol sales after the third quarter of any basketball game.

== See also ==
- Sports fan
