= Zadik–Barak–Levin syndrome =

- Other names: Dermoid cysts, hypothyroidism, cleft palate and hypodontia

Zadik–Barak–Levin syndrome (ZBLS) is a congenital disorder in humans. Presenting conditions include primary hypothyroidism, cleft palate, hypodontia, and ectodermal dysplasia. It is the result of an embryonic defect in the mesodermal-ectodermal midline development.

== Signs and symptoms ==
- anodontia/oligodontia—no teeth or fewer teeth than normal
- cleft palate
- depressed nasal bridge
- dry skin
- ectopic/agenesis/hypoplastic thyroid
- epibulbar dermoid
- frontal bossing
- hypertelorism
- hypothyroidy
- lordosis
- macroglossia
- microcephaly
- micrognatia/retrognatia—small or recessed jaw(s)
- polyhydramnios
- short stature/dwarfism
- sparse/absent scalp hair(generalized)
- squint/paresis of ocular muscles
- umbilical hernia
