= Burak Haşhaş =

Turkish international carom billiards player (born 2006)

Personal information
- Born: 8 April 2006 (age 20) Istanbul, Turkey

Sport
- Country: Turkey
- Sport: Snooker

Burak Haşhaş (born 8 April 2006) is a Turkish international carom billiards player specialized in three-cushion events. He is European U-17 and world U-22 champion.

== Private life ==
Burak Haşhaş was born in Istanbul, Turkey on 8 April 2006. His father is an amateur billiard player. He is a high school student in Istanbul.

== Early years ==
Burak Haşhaş started billiard playing at the age of 9–10. In the beginning, he did not intend to pursue a billiard player career, since was playing football. In 202, he switched over to billiards, quiting playing football.

In February 2020 and April 2021, he placed third at the Turkish Juniors Championships. Later, in October and November that year, he was Turkish juniors champion. In 2022, he achieved his first Turkish campion title, and became European champion in U-17 small table championship. At club tournaments in Turkey, he played also against Turkish world champions Tayfun Taşdemir and Semih Saygıner.

== International career ==
Haaşhaş became European champion at the Euro Youth 2022 organized by the Confédération Européenne de Billard and held in Desio, Italy on 7–10 April.

During his stay in Italy, he met Gülşen Degener, a female Turkish multiple European champion carom billiard player, who introduced him to Dutch players. For preparations to the world juniors championship, he went to Tilburg, Netherlands and played in the Dutch league for the local club Cues&Darts.

He participated at the 2022 World Championship 3-Cushion Juniors U22 organized by the Royal Dutch Billiards Federation and held in Heerhugowaard, Netherlands on 23–35 September, and won the gold medal.
