= Barac =

Barac may refer to:

- Barak, a 12th Century BC ruler and judge of Ancient Israel
- Romanian Mioritic Shepherd Dog, a.k.a. Barac
- Caves of Barać, in Croatia

== People ==
Barac

- Antun Barac (1894–1955), Croatian historian
- Fran Barac (1872–1940), Croatian theologian and politician
- Ioan Barac (1776–1848), Romanian poet
- Jakub Barac (born 1996), Czech footballer

Barač

- Valér Barač (1909–1991), Slovak athlete

Barać

- Ante Barać (born 1980), Croatian footballer
- Antonio Barać (born 1997), Croatian racing cyclist
- Boris Barać (born 1992), Croatian basketball player
- Marko Barać (born 1989), Serbian basketball coach
- Mateo Barać (born 1994), Croatian footballer
- Pankracije Barać (born 1981), Croatian basketball player
- Samir Barać (born 1973), Croatian water polo player
- Stanko Barać (born 1986), Croatian basketball player
- Verica Barać (1955–2012), Serbian lawyer

== See also ==
- Barak (disambiguation)
- Barach
- Baraq (disambiguation)
- Barack (disambiguation)
- Baracs, village in Hungary
