= Baruch Ostrovsky =

Israeli politician (1890–1960)

- ברוך אוסטרובסקי
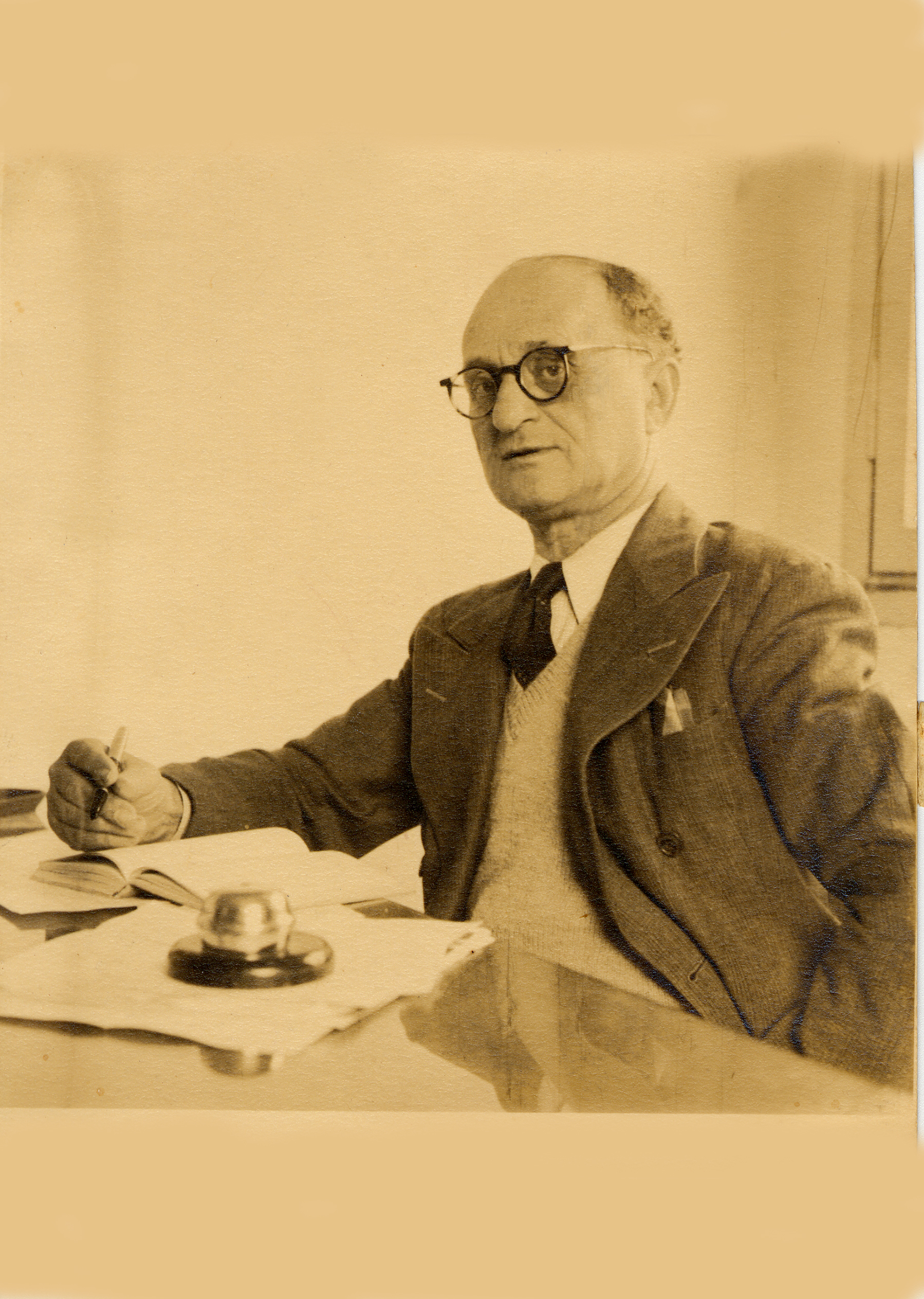

1st and 3rd Mayor of Ra'anana
- In office 1931–1955
- Preceded by: Position established
- Succeeded by: Michael Peswig
- In office 1957–1959
- Preceded by: Michael Peswig
- Succeeded by: Michael Peswig

Personal details
- Born: 10 October 1890 Rahachow, Mogilev Governorate, Russian Empire (now Belarus)
- Died: 17 July 1960 (aged 69) Israel
- Spouse: Feiga Ostrovsky
- Children: Shoshana, Ben-Zion, Ayala

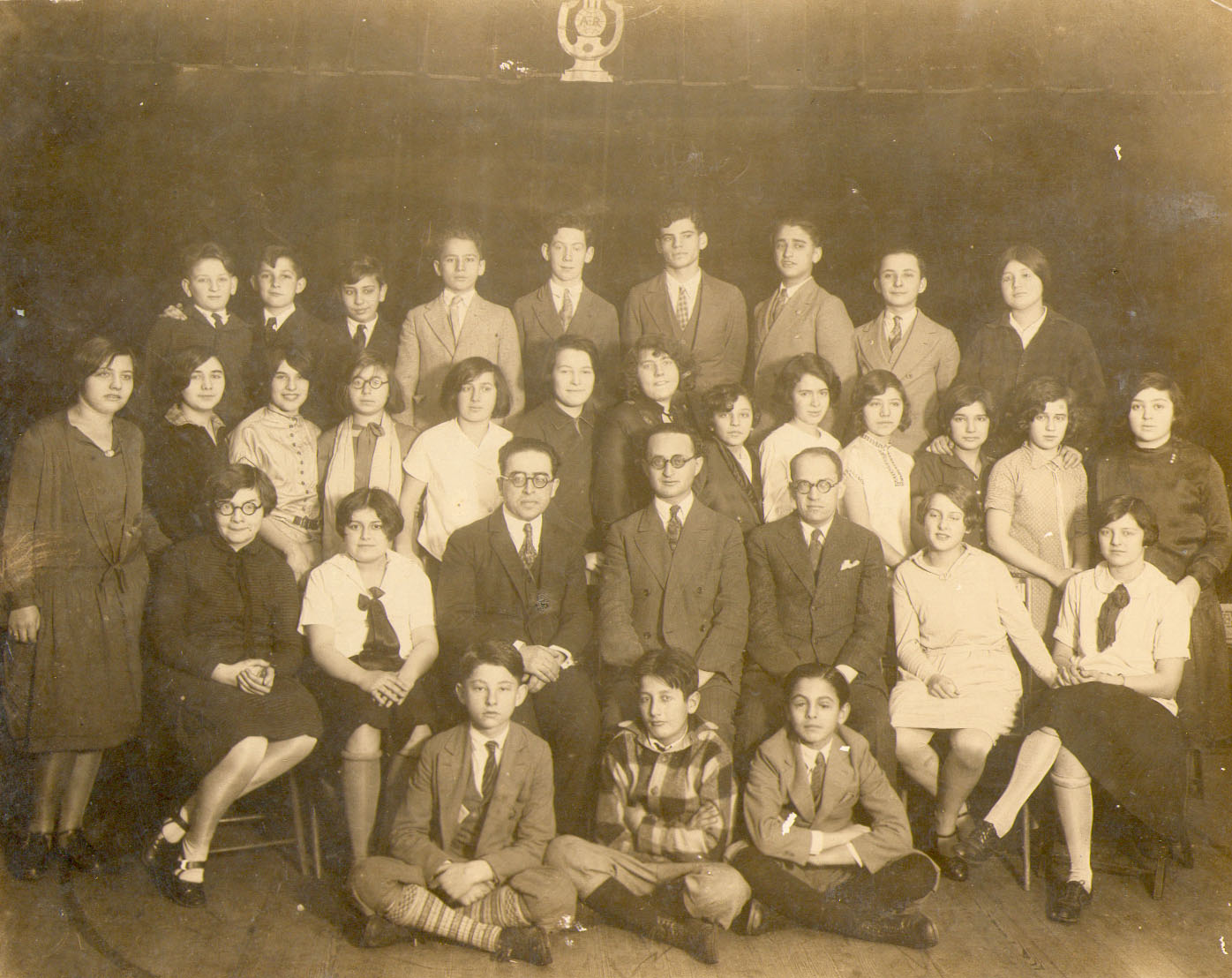
Graduates of the I. L. Peretz School in New York under the directorship of Baruch Ostrovsky (sitting in the center). (Mid-1920s)

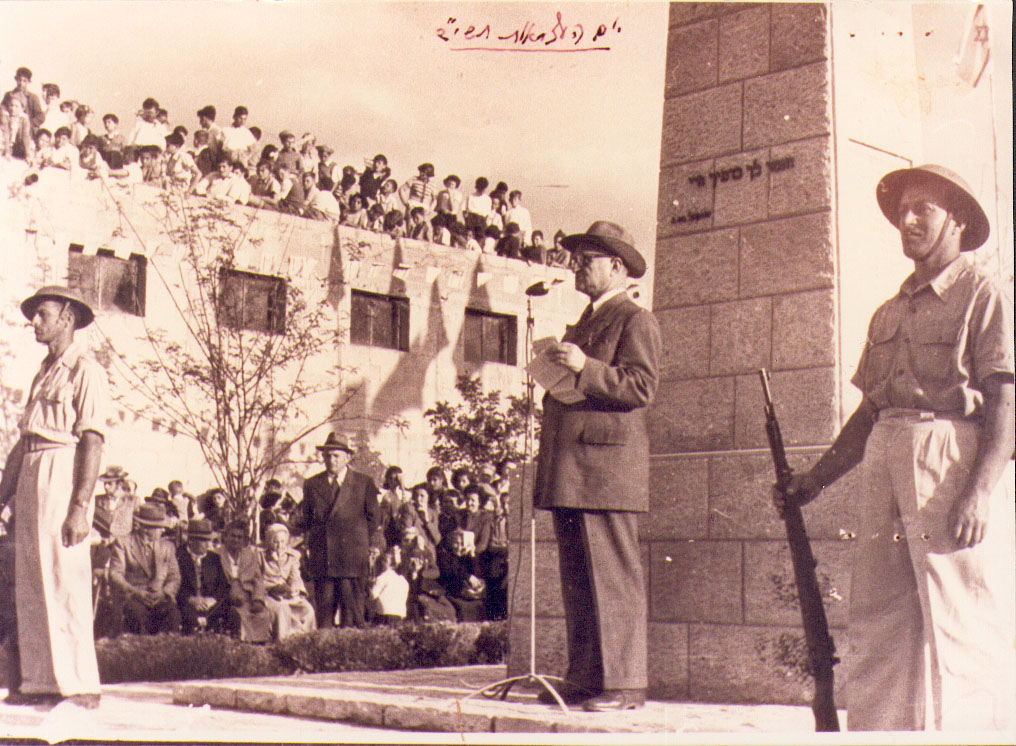
Ostrovsky speaking to the people of Ra'anana in Independence Day at the soldier's monument, 1954.

Baruch Ostrovsky (Hebrew: ברוך אוסטרובסקי; 10 October 1890 – 17 July 1960) was the first mayor of Ra'anana, Israel, and served as mayor for 28 years. He championed democracy, equality, education and organized Jewish labor.

== Background ==
Baruch Ostrovsky was born in Russian Empire, in the town of Rahachow (now in Belarus), in 1890. In early childhood, receiving a traditional Jewish education, he already demonstrated a craving for higher education and Zionism. In 1912 he immigrated to Palestine alone, laboring with the pioneers of the Second Aliyah and joining the HaShomer organization. A year later, he departed for the United States with the intention of marrying his fiancée, who had by then arrived there from Russia. The political situation — the outbreak of World War I — obstructed his plans to return at once with his family.

== In the United States ==
In 1913 he took part in the founding of Ahuza Alef in New York, an organization dedicated to the purchase of lands and the establishment of a Hebrew settlement, to be inhabited by Jews tilling their own soil.

While in the United States, Ostrovsky earned his living teaching a wide variety of subjects, including Hebrew, history, Bible, as well as Yiddish. He became a renowned and respected educational figure, as director and inspector of schools as well as principal of the teacher's seminary of the Workmen's Circle Jewish educational system. Contemporaneously with his educational work, Ostrovsky was active in the Zionist Movement's labor organization, Poale Zion, with the leaders David Ben-Gurion, Ber Borochov and Yitzhak Ben-Zvi. He directed and published the Youth Organizations' journal.

== In Israel ==
In 1930 Ostrovsky finally succeeded in fulfilling his Zionist ambition by giving up his comfortable existence in the USA and settling in Ra'anana, a small town in the Sharon plain, with his wife and two children.

"As a Zionist, I abandoned my source of income, the respected position I acquired in America as the principal of a high school in NY, as the head of the Jewish Teachers' Union, as editor of a Jewish Journal and as author of Yiddish school books and immigrated to Eretz Yisrael. A Zionist is not only said ..." (Excerpt from Ostrovsky's Diary)

Ostrovsky regarded Ra'anana as his life project and as mayor, he dedicated himself fully and wholeheartedly to Ra'anana's construction and development. His public service was a non-paid voluntary post as he refused payment in excess of the salary of an agricultural day laborer, which he was earning. The equivalent of his municipal salary formed a lending fund at the disposal of the needy. Many of the early settlers of Ra'anana benefited from his support. He displayed sincere concern for the welfare and rights of the laborers. He joined forces to form a variety of beneficial enterprises: a unified labor office, a unified front protecting organized Jewish labor, a joint health fund (kupat holim) for all inhabitants of the town, and the establishment of a lending and savings bank; also, the organization of a permanent water supply system for the town.

Ostrovsky's activities as a supporter of organized Jewish labor are augmented by his campaign for laborers' voting rights — deprived from the newcomers by the older Jewish settlements taking advantage of the mandate's discriminatory set of laws. His modest mode of life, scorning all forms of luxury and excess, placed him on equal ground with the hard working and low earning inhabitants of his town. He nurtured good relations with the neighboring Arab villagers, particularly with those of Hirbet Azun. He set high standards for the city as a 'green' settlement, promoted equality and the welfare of citizens, and laid the foundation stones of many public and educational institutions.

In the mid-1930s, Ostrovsky had already laid the foundations and infrastructure for factories to be built in the settlement of Ra'anana. In December 1949, he initiated the establishment of the industrial zone and directed his efforts to the building of the first industrial plants. This was part of an endeavor to create job opportunities for new immigrants and existing residents alike. Ostrovsky said in 1951 that "We deal with industry exactly as we deal with agriculture." (quoted from the minutes of a local council meeting on 2.1.1951)

Ostrovsky was a lover of books and his 4,000-volume library, encompassing a wide variety of subjects – on the history of the Zionist organization, on Eretz Yisrael, history, philosophy, education, literature and encyclopedias – were at the disposal of those eager to broaden their knowledge in the developing town.

Ostrovsky envisioned the plans for Ra'anana's first high school, although he did not live to see it. Late in his life he wrote:

"We emigrated from America, not to be capitalists or land-owners, but rather to be Jews and live amongst Jews in an independent Jewish State, a democratic existence of equality, wherein everyone will be capable of earning his living – even if we are the sole followers of this socialistic system."

== Gallery ==
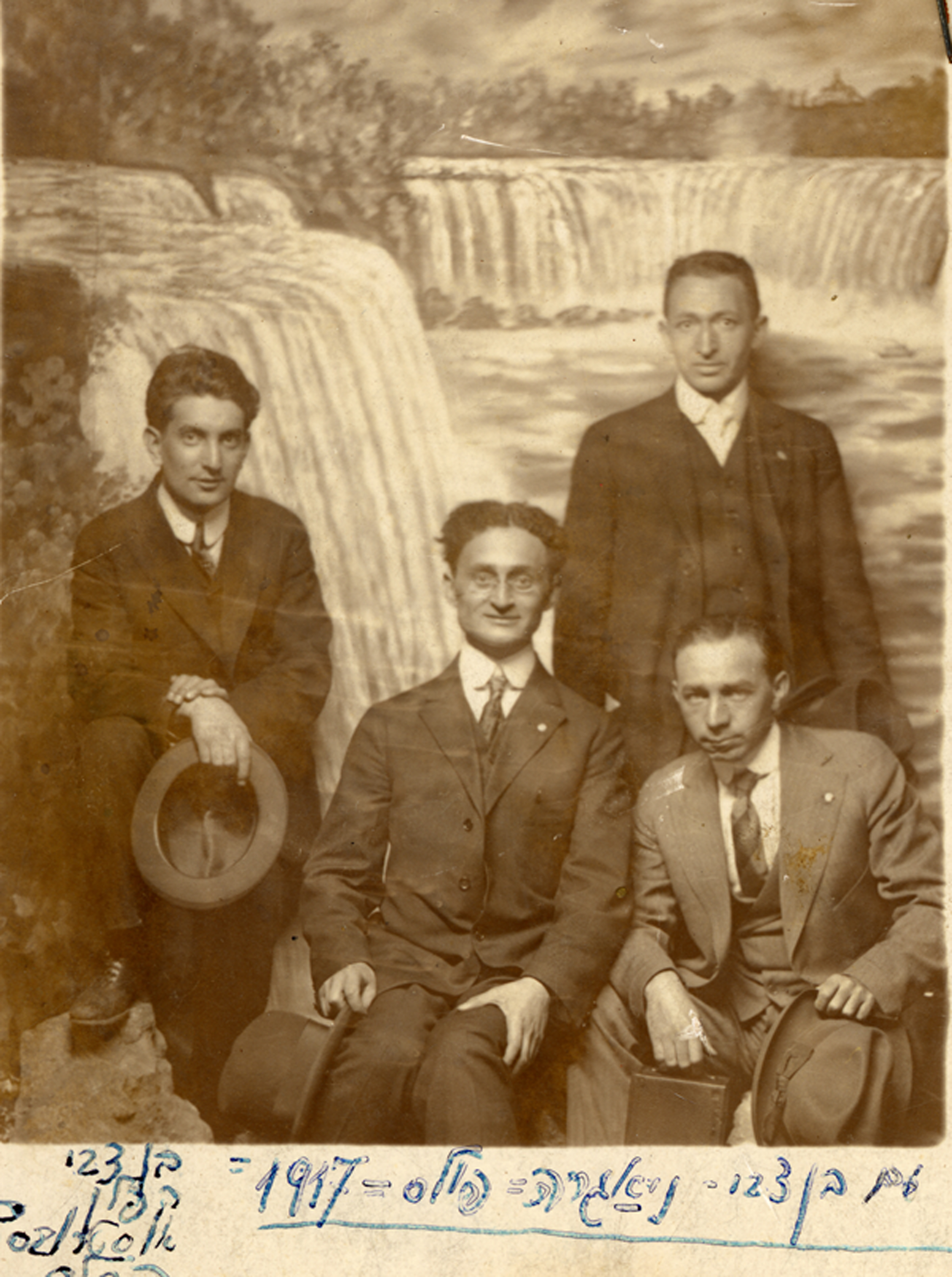
1917: Baruch Ostrovsky (sitting in the center) with members of "Poale Zion". Yizhak Ben-Zvi, the second president of Israel, standing at the right. The other members are Kaplan and Barels.

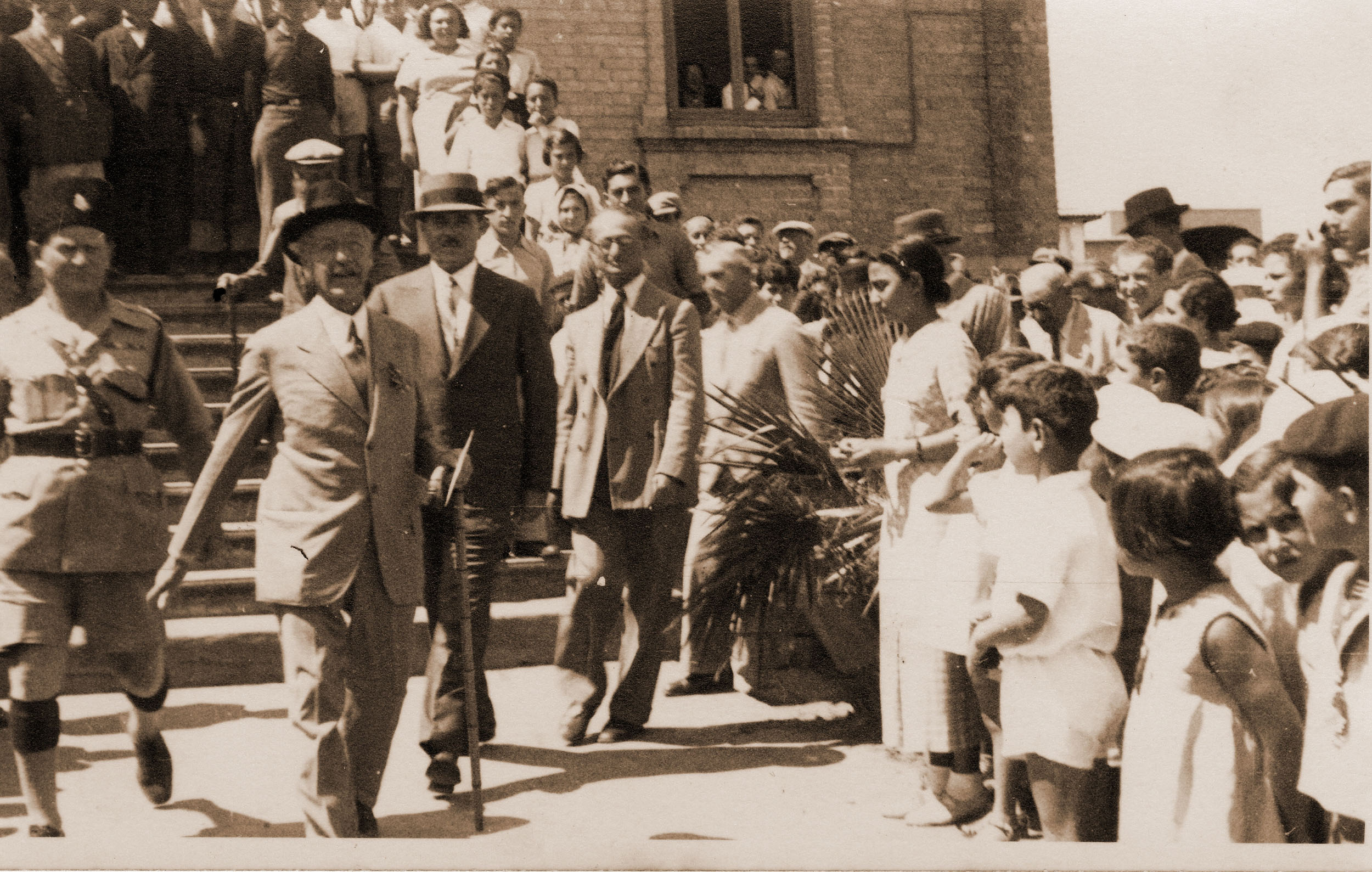
1937: Reception for the British High Commissioner, Sir Arthur Wauchope (at the entrance of the Raanana City Hall). The mayor, Mr. B. Ostrovsky, The Officer M. Schiff and the District Commissioner Mr. Cooperman are also participating at the ceremony. The onlookers are the citizens of Raanana.

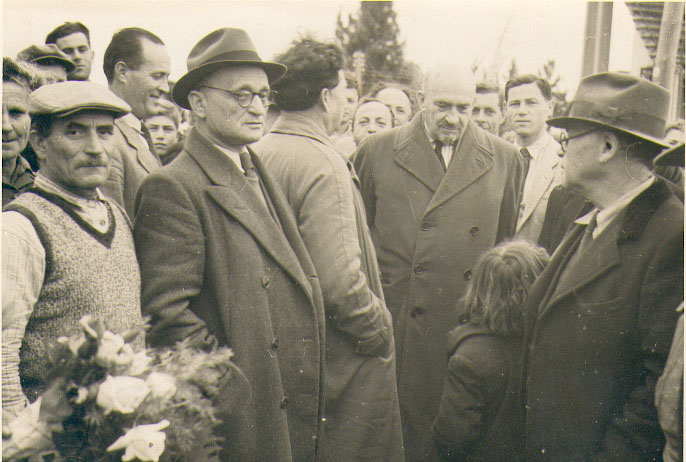
1950: The first Mayor of Raanana Mr. B. Ostrovsky and the inhabitants of the town, are warmly welcoming the first President of Israel, Dr. Haim Weizman, on his visit to Raanana.

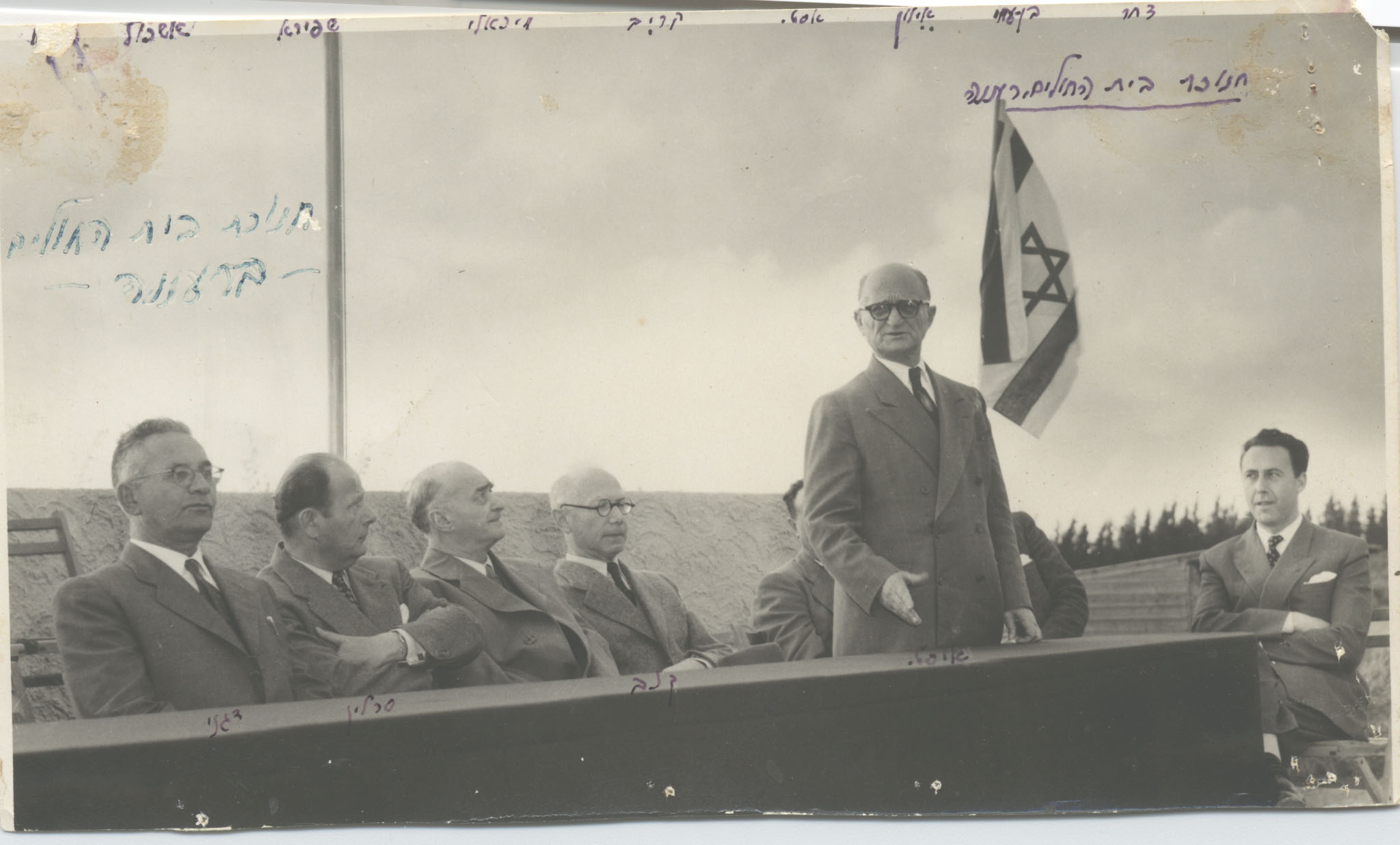
1953: The mayor, Mr. B. Ostrovsky, speaking at the gala opening of the Loewenstein Hospital in Raanana.
