= Burak (name) =

Burak is a Turkish masculine name that derives from the Arabic Buraq, which literally means "lightning" and refers to a creature that transports prophets in Arabic tradition.

== Given name ==
- Burak Abay (born 1996), Turkish cyclist
- Burak Akcapar (born 1967), Turkish diplomat
- Burak Bekdil (1966–2023), Turkish columnist
- Burak Dakak (born 1998), Turkish actor
- Burak Deniz (born 1991), Turkish actor
- Burak Eldem (born 1961), Turkish journalist
- Burak Güven (born 1975), Turkish musician
- Burak Haşhaş (born 2006), Turkish carom billiard player
- Burak Kaplan (born 1990), Turkish footballer
- Burak Özçivit (born 1984) Turkish actor
- Burak Özdemir (CZN Burak) (born 1995), Turkish chef
- Burak Uygur (born 1995), Turkish karateka
- Burak Yeter (born 1982), Turkish Dutch DJ, record producer and remixer
- Burak Yılmaz (born 1985), Turkish footballer

== Middle name ==
- Ahmet Burak Erdoğan (born 1979), son of Turkish president Recep Tayyip Erdoğan
- Tevfik Burak Babaoğlu (born 1993), Turkish foil fencer

== Surname ==
- Sevim Burak (1931–1983), Turkish writer
