= Valia Barak =

Peruvian journalist and television presenter

- Born: Valia Isabel Barak Pastor; 11 September 1969 (age 56); Lima, Peru
- Education: Universidad Inca Garcilaso de la Vega
- Occupations: Journalist, television presenter
- Spouse: Eduardo Chávez Guerra

Valia Isabel Barak Pastor (born 11 September 1969) is a Peruvian journalist and television presenter.

== Biography ==
Valia Barak was born in 1969, of Russian-Jewish ancestry by her paternal grandfather. She studied at the Jaime Bausate y Meza School of Journalism at the National University of San Marcos, and graduated with a degree in psychology from Inca Garcilaso de la Vega University on 27 May 2016.

She began her journalism career on Panamericana Televisión. She debuted as a news presenter on the show 24 horas, which she hosted from 1998 to 2003.

In 2004, Barak moved to Frecuencia Latina as the host of a new Sunday show, Séptimo día. From 2005 to 2008 she hosted the central edition of 90 segundos. In 2007, she presented the talk show Mujeres de palabra on the same channel.

In 2009, she returned to Panamericana Televisión to host 24 horas, edición central. The following year she hosted the morning news show Buenos Días, Perú, and later, 24 horas, edición mediodía.

In 2012, Barak became a contestant on the reality dance series El gran show.

== Television shows ==
- Séptimo día (2003–04)
- 90 segundos (2005–2009)
- Mujeres de palabra (2007)
- 24 horas (1998-2003) (2009–2010)
- Buenos Días, Perú (1998–99, 2001, 2010–2011)
- 24 horas, edición mediodía (2011–2012)
- El gran show (contestant 2012)
- Alto al Crimen (director since 2012)
