= Mattersight Corporation =

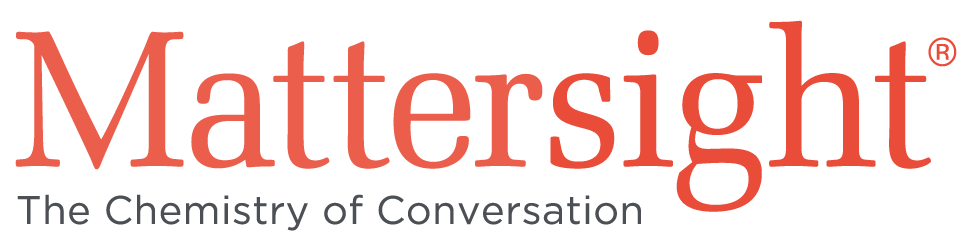
- Type: Public
- Traded as: Nasdaq: MATR
- Industry: Enterprise analytics
- Founded: 2006; 20 years ago
- Headquarters: Chicago, Illinois, United States
- Area served: Worldwide
- Key people: Kelly Conway (president and CEO)
- Website: mattersight.com

Mattersight Corporation, formerly known as eLoyalty, is a publicly traded company that provides SaaS-based enterprise behavioral analytics software. Its software focuses on customer-employee interaction and behavior. The company is headquartered in Chicago, Illinois, and was founded in 1994.

== History ==
Mattersight was founded as the Behavioral Analytics service line within eLoyalty, a call center consulting and technology services firm, by president and CEO Kelly Conway in 2006. In 2011, TeleTech acquired the Integrated Contact Solutions unit of eLoyalty. The behavioral analytics unit launched as Mattersight Corporation. In 2014, Mattersight was recognized by Customer Magazine for Product of the Year Award for the second consecutive year. In 2013, the company raised $6 million through selling shares.

== Service ==
Mattersight provides a software-as-a-service using predictive customer analytics, speech analytics, and behavioral analytics technologies to analyze and improve contact center performance and agent interactions. It uses a data analysis system that listens to the way customers respond on the telephone, analyzing communication patterns, grammar, word choice, tone, volume, pauses, and other communication metrics. Mathematical algorithms then interpret vocal features, compare them to their databases, and arrive at a personality profile for each customer, who is then matched with a service agent with whom the customer is most compatible.

== See also ==
- Behavioral targeting
- Predictive modeling
