= Jindřich Barák =

Czech ice hockey player

- Born: October 2, 1991 (age 34) Prague, Czechoslovakia
- Height: 5 ft 10 in (178 cm)
- Weight: 187 lb (85 kg; 13 st 5 lb)
- Position: Defence
- Shoots: Left
- Czech Extraliga team: HC Slavia Praha
- Playing career: 2010–present

Jindřich Barák (born October 2, 1991, in Prague) is a Czech professional ice hockey player. He played with HC Slavia Praha in the Czech Extraliga during the 2010–11 Czech Extraliga season.
