= Barakah =

Blessing power in Islam

Barakah or Baraka (Arabic: بركة "blessing") is a blessing power in Islam, a kind of continuity of spiritual presence and revelation that begins with God and flows through that and those closest to God.

According to G.S. Colin, the Quran is said to be charged with barakah, and God can bestow prophets and saints with barakah. Muhammad and his descendants are said to be especially endowed with it. These special people, whether alive or dead, can transfer their barakah to ordinary people.

Sacred places are said to contain barakah and ward off evil spiritual forces, thus monasteries and Sufi temples are often visited for protection against demonic beings.

Barakah is also described as a blessing force of creation and fertility, causing cereals to miraculously multiply.

The concept is also used by Arabic-speaking Christians, notably the Coptic Orthodox community in Egypt, to refer to the holy power which is believed to emanate from saints and the sites and relics sacred to them. Relics and locations carry baraka based on their literal or metaphorical proximity to a holy person. In line with Egypt's long history of holy sites and figures venerated by both its major religions, Copts believe that the benefits of baraka are not limited solely to members of the Coptic Church, and that followers of Islam and other denominations of Christianity can gain blessings from encounters with holy artifacts and locations.

== See also ==
- Dervish
- Mana
- Numen
- Bracha
