= Bengt =

Bengt is a Swedish-language masculine given name, derived from Benedict and first documented in the 12th century.

People with the name include:

== Artists and entertainers ==
=== Actors ===
- Bengt Djurberg (1898–1941), Swedish actor and singer
- Bengt Ekerot (1920–1971), Swedish actor and director
- Bengt Eklund (1925–1998), Swedish actor
- Bengt Logardt (1914–1994), Swedish actor, screenwriter and film director
- Bengt Nilsson (actor) (born 1954), Swedish actor

=== Journalists and writers ===
- Bengt Feldreich (1925–2019), Swedish journalist and teacher
- Bengt Frithiofsson (1939–2024), Swedish wine writer
- Bengt Lidner (1757–1793), Swedish poet
- Bengt Linder (1929–1985), Swedish writer and journalist
- Bengt Magnusson (born 1950), Swedish journalist and a TV presenter
- Bengt Pohjanen (born 1944), Swedish author, translator and priest
- Bengt Öste (1927–2004), Swedish journalist and a TV presenter

=== Musicians ===
- Bengt Berger (1942–2026), Swedish jazz drummer, composer and producer
- Bengt Calmeyer, Swedish musician in the band Turbonegro
- Bengt Djurberg (1898–1941), Swedish actor and singer
- Bengt Forsberg (born 1952), Swedish concert pianist
- Bengt Hallberg (1932–2013), Swedish jazz musician
- Bengt Hambraeus (1928–2000), Swedish organist, composer and musicologist
- Bengt Lagerberg (born 1973), drummer in the Swedish rock band The Cardigans

=== Other artists ===
- Bengt Erland Fogelberg (1786–1854), Swedish sculptor
- Bengt Forslund (born 1932), Swedish film producer, screenwriter and production manager
- Bengt Lindroos (1918–2010), Swedish architect
- Bengt Lindström (1925–2008), Swedish artist
- Bengt Logardt (1914–1994), Swedish actor, screenwriter and film director
- Bengtolle Oldinger (1911–1988), born as Bengt Anders Valter Oldinger, Swedish painter
- Bengt Nordenberg (1822–1902), Swedish artist
- Bengt Schalin (1889–1982), Finnish garden architect and botanist

== Politicians and diplomats ==
- Bengt-Anders Johansson (born 1951), Swedish politician of the Moderate Party
- Bengt Berg (born 1946), Swedish poet and politician
- Bengt Bergt (born 1982), German drummer and politician
- Bengt Börjesson (1920–1977), Swedish politician
- Bengt Gabrielsson Oxenstierna (1623–1702), Swedish statesman
- Bengt Gottfried Forselius (c. 1660–1688), founder of public education in Estonia
- Bengt Göransson (1932–2021), Swedish politician
- Bengt Holgersson (born 1941), first Governor of Skåne County
- Bengt Holmquist (1926–1993), Swedish diplomat
- Bengt Hult (1917–2008), Swedish jurist, President of the Supreme Court of Sweden
- Bengt Lidforss (1868–1913), Swedish socialist
- Bengt Norling (1925–2002), Swedish politician
- Bengt Odevall (1921–2006), Swedish diplomat
- Bengt Rösiö (1927–2019), Swedish diplomat
- Bengt Westerberg (born 1943), Swedish politician

== Scientists and academics ==
=== Life sciences ===
- Bengt Anders Euphrasén (1756–1796), Swedish botanist and zoologist
- Bengt Berg (ornithologist) (1885–1967), Swedish ornithologist, zoologist, wildlife photographer and writer
- Bengt Nölting (1962–2009), German physicist and biophysicist
- Bengt I. Samuelsson (1934–2024), Swedish biochemist
- Bengt Schalin (1889–1982), Finnish garden architect and botanist

=== Physical sciences ===
- Bengt Andersson Qvist (1729–1799), Swedish chemist and mineralogist
- Bengt Edlén (1906–1993), Swedish professor of physics and astronomer
- Bengt Nölting (1962–2009), German physicist and biophysicist
- Bengt Nordén (born 1945), Swedish chemist
- Bengt Strömgren (1908–1987), Danish astronomer and astrophysicist; namesake of asteroid 1846 Bengt

=== Other disciplines ===
- Bengt-Åke Lundvall (born 1941), professor of Business Studies at Aalborg University in Denmark
- Bengt Danielsson (1921–1997), anthropologist and crew member on the Kon-Tiki
- Bengt Feldreich (1925–2019), Swedish journalist and teacher
- Bengt Holbek (1933–1992), Danish folklorist
- Bengt R. Holmström (born 1949), Finnish professor of economics at M.I.T.
- Bengt af Klintberg (born 1938), Swedish ethnologist

== Sportspeople ==
=== Aquatic sports ===
- Bengt Backlund (1926–2006), Swedish flatwater canoer
- Bengt Baron (born 1962), Swedish former backstroke swimmer
- Bengt Gingsjö (1952–2022), Swedish freestyle and medley swimmer
- Bengt Heyman (1883–1942), Swedish sailor
- Bengt Linfors, Swedish sprint canoer
- Bengt Palmquist (1923–1995), Swedish sailor
- Bengt Zikarsky (born 1967), German former freestyle swimmer

=== Footballers ===
- Bengt Berg (footballer), Swedish former footballer
- Bengt Berndtsson (1933–2015), Swedish football player
- Bengt Gustavsson (1928–2017), Swedish football player and trainer
- Bengt Lindskog (1933–2008), Swedish football player
- Bengt Madsen (1942–2021), Swedish football chairman
- Bengt Sæternes (born 1975), Norwegian football player

=== Winter sports ===
- Bengt-Åke Gustafsson (born 1958), Swedish ice hockey player
- Bengt Åkerblom (1967–1995), Swedish ice hockey player
- Bengt Eriksson (1931–2014), Swedish Nordic combined skier
- Bengt Fjällberg (born 1961), Swedish alpine skier
- Bengt Leandersson, Swedish ski-orienteering competitor
- Bengt Lundholm (born 1955), Swedish retired professional ice hockey player
- Bengt Malmsten (1922–1996), Swedish speed skater
- Bengt Walden (born 1973), Swedish-born, American luger
- Börje-Bengt Hedblom, Swedish bobsledder

=== Other sportspeople ===
- Bengt Åberg (1944–2021), Swedish motocross racer
- Bengt Bengtsson (1897–1977), Swedish gymnast
- Bengt Fahlqvist (1922–2004), Swedish wrestler
- Bengt Fröman (born 1950), Swedish male badminton player
- Bengt Jansson (born 1943), Swedish international speedway rider
- Bengt Johansson (handball) (1942–2022), Swedish handball player and coach
- Bengt Lagercrantz (1887–1924), Swedish sport shooter
- Bengt Levin (1958–2020), Swedish orienteering competitor
- Bengt Ljungquist (1912–1979), Swedish fencer and equestrian
- Bengt Morberg (1897–1968), Swedish gymnast
- Bengt Sjöstedt (1906–1981), Finnish hurdler

== Other people ==
- Bengt Andersson (disambiguation)
- Bengt Ekenberg (1912–1986), Swedish chess master
- Bengt Fredman (1916–2008), Swedish Army officer
- Bengt Gustafsson (disambiguation)
- Bengt Hägglund (1920–2015), Swedish theologian
- Bengt-Arne Johansson (officer) (1943–2025), Swedish lieutenant-general
- Bengt Jönsson (disambiguation)
- Bengt Lehander (1925–1994), Swedish Air Force lieutenant general
- Bengt Lundvall (1915–2010), Swedish Navy admiral
- Bengt Lönnbom (1933–2024), Swedish Air Force major general
- Bengt Nordenskiöld (1891–1983), Swedish Air Force general
- Bengt Oxenstierna (disambiguation)
- Bengt Rosenius (1918–1979), Swedish Air Force major general
- Bengt Simonsen (disambiguation)
- Bengt Snivil (mid-12th century), Swedish magnate
- Bengt Svensson (born 1958), Swedish Army officer

== See also ==
- Bengtsson, a Swedish surname
