= Bengtsson =

Bengtsson bengts for short
- Language: Swedish

Origin
- Meaning: "son of Bengt"

Bengtsson is Swedish surname. It originated as a patronymic meaning "son of Bengt" (Benedict), Bengt meaning "Blessed". The name is sometimes written Bengtson (a form frequently adopted by migrants to the United States). Other forms occur, such as Bengtzon, Bankson, Bankston, Benson, Bengston or Benktsson.

Bengtsson is the 15th most common surname in Sweden.

Notable people with the surname include:

- Anders Bengtsson (born 1968), Swedish politician and member of parliament
- Angelica Bengtsson (born 1993), Swedish pole vaulter
- Bengt Bengtsson (1897–1977), Swedish gymnast
- Bengt-Åke Bengtsson (born 1938), Swedish rower
- Birgitta Bengtsson (born 1965), Swedish sailor
- Björn Bengtsson (born 1973), Swedish actor
- Catrine Bengtsson (born 1969), Swedish badminton player
- Christopher Bengtsson (born 1993), Swedish professional ice hockey player
- Emma Bengtsson (born 1981), Swedish chef
- Erik G. Bengtsson (born 1928), Swedish Army lieutenant general
- Erling Blöndal Bengtsson (1932–2013), Danish cellist
- Frans G. Bengtsson (1894–1954), Swedish author
- Gabriel Bengtsson (born 1977), Swedish judoka
- Göran Bengtsson (born 1956), Swedish handball player
- Gösta Bengtsson (1897–1984), Swedish sailor
- Gunder Bengtsson (1946–2019), Swedish football coach
- Gunnar Bengtsson (1909–1993), Swedish mass murderer
- Håkan Bengtsson (1942–2026), Swedish swimmer
- Håkan Bengtsson (actor) (fl. from 2023), Swedish actor in the 2023 TV series Fallen
- Ingemund Bengtsson (1919–2000), Swedish politician and Speaker of the Riksdag 1979–1988
- Jan-Olof Bengtsson (born 1952), Swedish journalist
- Johan Bengtsson (born 1979), Swedish bassist
- Kristin Bengtsson (born 1970), Swedish female footballer
- Lennart Bengtsson (born 1935), Swedish meteorologist
- Leo Bengtsson (born 1998), Swedish footballer
- Margot Bengtsson (born 1943), Swedish psychologist and feminist scholar
- Maria Bengtsson (badminton) (born 1964), Swedish badminton player
- Maria Bengtsson (soprano) (born 1975)
- Martin Bengtsson (footballer) (born 1986), Swedish footballer
- Martin Bengtsson (musician) (born 1974), Swedish heavy metal musician
- Mikael Bengtsson (born 1981), Swedish footballer
- Per Bengtsson (born 1967), Swedish speed skater
- Per-Inge Bengtsson (born 1961), Swedish sprint canoer
- Pierre Bengtsson (born 1988), Swedish footballer
- Rasmus Bengtsson (born 1986), Swedish footballer
- Robin Bengtsson (born 1990), Swedish singer
- Rolf-Göran Bengtsson (born 1962), Swedish horse rider and silver medalist in Individual Jumping at the 2008 Beijing Olympic Games
- Stellan Bengtsson (born 1952), Swedish table tennis player
- Sylve Bengtsson (1930–2005), Swedish footballer
- Thomas Bengtsson (born 1967), known professionally as Tom Stone, Swedish magician

Similar spellings

- Jerry Bengtson (born 1987), Honduran footballer
- John Bengtson (1948–2024), U.S. linguist
- Phil Bengtson (1913–1994), U.S. American football player

Bengtsson as a middle name

- Jöns Bengtsson Oxenstierna (fl. 15th-century), Swedish archbishop
