= Det femte väderstrecket =

Swedish television series

Det femte väderstrecket ("The Fifth Cardinal direction") was a Swedish TV series with the Hej hej sommar-host Nic Schröder, broadcast together with the 2008 "Sommarlovsmorgon" Hej hej sommar in Sveriges Television.

== Plot ==
Sandra Dahlberg and "Svante" host Hej hej sommar, and they work together with Nic for "Sektion SG", Sektion för särskilt granskande ("Section for special investigation"). The whole summer Nic looks for an instrument which may help him finding "the fifth cardinal direction" and every week he has to report to Sandra. The ornithologist Love Ostberg (played by Niklas Bergström) helps Nic.

== References and sources ==
- Sveriges Television's website
- Det femte väderstrecket on Swedish Media Database
