= Badeboda Bo =

Swedish children's television show set

Badeboda Bo was the name of the house used as studio for Sveriges Television's Sommarlovsmorgon (Swedish "Summer vacation Morning") the summers of 2003 and 2004. The house was built in Växjö, in the forest behind SVT Växjö's former studio. However, the forest as well as the house was demolished when SVT Växjö moved to Teleborg, and a new playground was built up in 2008.

== 2003: Badeboda Bo ==
The 2003 Sommarlovsmorgon was Badeboda Bo, which was broadcast on SVT1, from the house Badeboda Bo, every morning except Saturdays and Sundays at 9.15am from 16 June to 8 August 2003.

=== Plot ===
Two detectives are hunting a girl who, however, hides herself and, during her escape, finds a direction sign showing the way to Badeboda Bo, a seaside hotel which has been run by the Eneman family for over a century. When meeting the hotel chief Eugen Eneman (played by Mattias Linderoth) and his younger brother and kitchen master Ebert Eneman (played by Henrik Johansson), she presents herself as Ella (played by Oldoz Javidi) and gets a job as artisan, but later reveals that she actually came to Badeboda Bo in order to seek a hiding place from the detectives (played by Klas Sivertson and Mikael Cedergren) who are hunting her, by order from the director of Stora hotellet i Badeboda (the "Badeboda Grand Hotel") Gottfrid Gnidhage (played by Niclas Fransson) who accused Ella for sabotaging a million-worth chandelier at Stora hotellet and forced her to pay him one million kronor or wash at least one million plates in the hotel kitchen, but after washing just a few plates Ella decided to flee from there and then happened to find the way to Badeboda Bo.

Every day, Ella, Eugen and Ebert watch TV programs like Spegel, Spegel, Ocean Star, Skrotnisse och hans vänner, Mr. Bean, Monsterskolan and The Three Friends and Jerry ("De tre vännerna och Jerry").

Every Monday, Badeboda Bo is visited by the sour inspector Condensia Collberg (played by Lena Athena Tolstoy), who always finds some fault and threatens to close down the hotel if the fault is not repaired within a week. However, the TV watchers are able to solve the problem of a week on the website (svt.se/badebodabo) and telephone Badeboda Bo and thereby help Ella, Eugen and Ebert to repair the fault and save the hotel from being closed down, or otherwise help them to solve other problems by giving them tips by the phone, and as a reward the TV watchers who have telephoned win a beach towel with the Badeboda Bo logotype.

By the end of the summer, it's proven that Badeboda Bo has de facto always been legally owned by the Collberg family and never by the Enemans, as Eugen's and Ebert's great-great-grandfather Ebenezer Eneman, who founded the seaside hotel, actually was a cheater, which is confirmed by an eye witness, a bartender (played by Erik Edwardsson):

In the year 1900, sailor Ebenezer Eneman (played by Jurgen Andersson) lost his capsized ship but luckily came into land. At an inn he met a countryman who presented himself as Charles P. Collberg (played by Martin Wargren), who proves to be brother of Condensia's great-great-grandmother Crinolina Collberg (also played by Lena Athena Tolstoy) and great-great-grandfather of Gottfrid Gnidhage. When gambling with Charles P. Collberg, Ebenezer Eneman was cheating and could thereby steal the certificate of title of Collberg's real property Badeboda Bo. However, as Collberg has never signed his certificate of title, he has never either accepted Eneman's deal, and therefore the deal is illegal and Condensia Collberg, the only living descendant of Charles P. Collberg, owns the legal right of ownership of Badeboda Bo.

However, Eugen and Ebert are saved from being evicted by Condensia Collberg from Badeboda Bo by their father Erland Eneman (also played by Jurgen Andersson), who disappeared 16 years ago when he left his sons for a job which he now, when returning home, reveals to have been digging a canal to Badeboda Bo all the way from the sea. Aware of the fact that his ancestor Ebenezer stole Badeboda Bo from the Collberg family who are the de facto owners of Badeboda Bo, Erland asks for permission to buy Badeboda Bo from Condensia who, however, decides to not sell it, but instead let Erland become her co-owner of it, and proves to be a good woman who actually is not so cruel as she has appeared to be the whole summer, which she shows earlier the same day as she allows Erland to join her as owner of Badeboda Bo, when she saves Ella from being arrested by Gottfrid Gnidhage and his two hired detectives. Condensia convinces Ella that she is actually innocent and that it is in fact Gnidhage himself who is behind the sabotage of the million-worth chandelier:

After giving Ella, an employee at Stora hotellet, a job to clean the room where the chandelier hung upon the roof, Gnidhage sneaked up to the upper floor to cut off the ropes, letting the chandelier fall down and smash into the floor, in order to cheatingly earn one million kronor from the insurance, but also in order to fabricate false proofs that Ella was responsible for the sabotage of the chandelier, using that as an excuse to force Ella to work for one million kronor and thereby exploiting Ella as labour without paying her.

After confronting Gnidhage for the sabotage, Condensia gives the detectives order to arrest him and let Ella go free.

=== Guest roles ===
- Stefan and Inga-Lill Leske as Mr and Mrs Stråkhage, midsummerguests
- Kenneth Rydholm as scoutleader, a midsummerguest
- Christian Jonsson as scouter
- Henrik and Maja Snögren as scouters
- Lasse Beischer and Morgan Alling as Lasse and Morgan, garbage collectors (known from Tippen)
- Annika Andersson as Doctor Fubbelkvist
- Peter Settman as Anton Argonius, actor
- Anna Blomberg as Vera Sund, a sour guest
- Anders Linder as Kapten Zoom (known from Vintergatan)
- Jonas Sykfont as Femman (known from Vintergatan)
- Anna Rydgren as Stacey, hotel manager

== 2004: Sommarkåken ==
In 2004, the Sommarlovsmorgon program was Sommarkåken ("The Summerhouse") which was broadcast on SVT1 every morning except Saturdays and Sundays, at 9.15am from 14 June to 6 August 2004, from the same house as Badeboda Bo was broadcast from the year before.

=== Plot ===
The former hotel Badeboda Bo has been sold to a TV team who have arranged a competition under the name Sommarkåken, which will be ongoing for eight weeks in the summer, and the winner will be rewarded with ten million kronor. Two competitors have been invited, Filip and Jasmin. Competitions are held for Filip and Jasmin every Friday while competitions for the TV watchers are held Monday–Thursday. Sommarkåken broadcasts TV programs, among them Pojken med guldbyxorna, Seaside Hotel and Search for Treasure Island ("Sökandet efter skattkammarön").

=== Hosts ===
- Henrik Olsson
- Anna Rydgren
- Fredrik Berling
- Josefine Sundström
- Henrik Ståhl

=== Guest roles ===
- Pontus Ströbaek as Filip
- Rayam Jazari as Jasmin
- Caroline Rendahl as Futuria
- Albin Holmberg as Joker
- Alf Pilnäs
