= Bankston =

Bankston may refer to:

== Places in the United States ==
- Bankston, Alabama
- Bankston, Iowa
- Bankston, Mississippi

== Other uses ==
- Bankston (surname)

== See also ==
- Bankstown, a suburb of Sydney, Australia
