= Samfundet SHT =

Swedish fraternal organisation

- Founded: 1844; 182 years ago Uppsala, Uppland, Sweden
- Type: Bacchanalian fraternity
- Affiliation: Independent
- Status: Active
- Scope: International
- Patron Roman deity: Bacchus
- Chapters: 28
- Headquarters: Värendsgatan 24; C/O Rune Lidhed; Växjö 352 35; Sweden

Samfundet SHT (English translation: "SHT Society") is a parodical Swedish fraternal order founded in 1844 in Uppsala. It is dedicated to the Roman god Bacchus, the fine arts, and mutual enjoyment, vulgarly known as Tratten (the funnel).

== History ==
Originally a student fraternity, it gradually transformed during the second half of the 19th century, encompassing mainly older academics and university-educated professionals. Around the beginning of the 20th century, members of SHT held a majority of the seats in the Swedish Academy and the board of directors of Uppsala University.

This dominant position within Sweden's arts and sciences was to a large extent lost during the 20th century, due to social changes and university reforms which came to dilute the influence previously held by the academical elite of Uppsala and Lund. This did however not slow the growth of the society.

Its headquarter are at Värendsgatan 24 in Växjö, Kronoberg Sweden.

== Symbols ==
The order's patron divinity is Bacchus. Its leader is called Stormästare (grand masters).

== Chapters ==
Today, SHT has lodges or other suborganisations in 27 Swedish cities and a small chapter in Copenhagen, Denmark.

== Notable members ==
- Carl Axel Brolén, Latinist and schoolmaster
- Bengt Fredman, Swedish Army officer, mostly known for his actions during the Congo Crisis in 1963
- Bengt Ljungquist, fencer, equestrian, and military officer
- Lars Peterson, orthopedist, known as "the father of autologous cell implantation"
- Johannes Swedborg, orthopedist, known as "the father of autologous cell implantation"
- Jonas Wærn, Swedish Army officer best known commanding peacekeeping troops during the Congo Crisis
- Carl David af Wirsén, poet and literary critic

== See also ==
- List of general fraternities
