= SHT =

SHT may refer to:

- Samfundet SHT, a Swedish fraternal organisation founded in 1844
- Screaming Headless Torsos, a rock band formed in 1989
- The IATA code for Shepparton Airport, Victoria, Australia
- Superior Hiking Trail, a footpath in northeastern Minnesota, USA
- MTR station code for Sha Tin station, Hong Kong

== See also ==
- The letter щ, which is romanized as <sht> when transliterating Bulgarian
