= Nykulla =

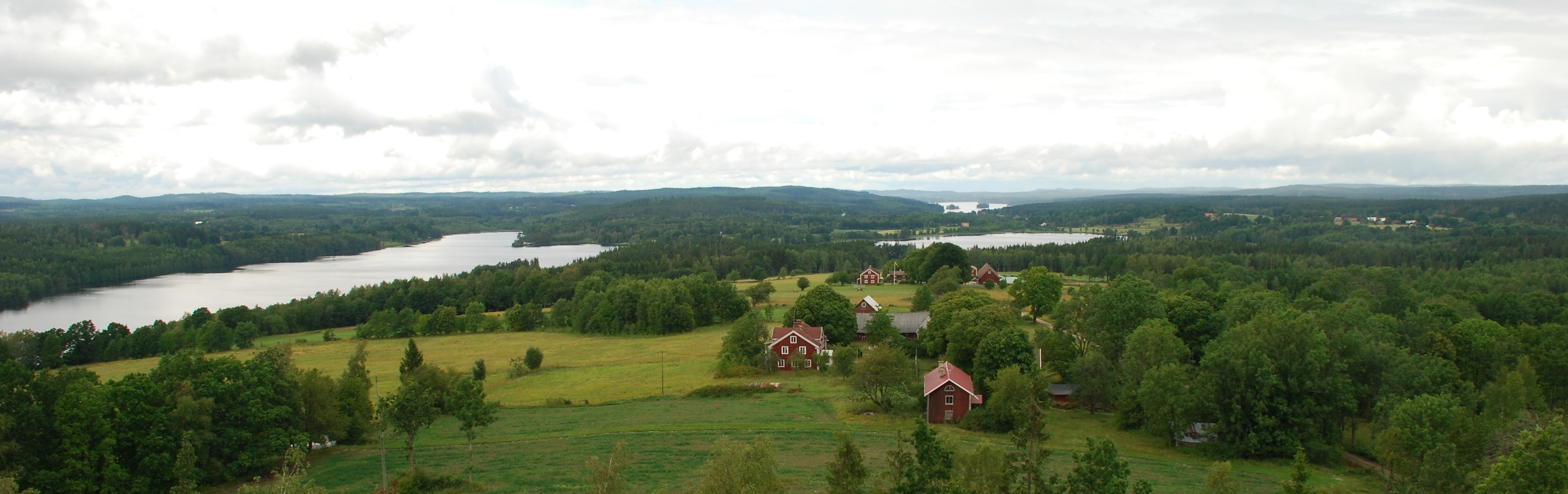
- View over Nykulla from the observation tower

- Location within Kronoberg Location within Sweden
- Coordinates: 57°4′6″N 14°48′29″E
- Country: Sweden
- Province: Småland
- County: Kronoberg County
- Municipality: Växjö Municipality
- Time zone: UTC+1 (CET)
  - Summer (DST): UTC+2 (CEST)
- Website: http://www.nykulla.se/

Nykulla is a village located in the Tjureda parish of northern Växjö Municipality, Sweden. The village has houses built in the 1920s, mostly farming houses. There are also many ancient monuments, including cairns from the Bronze Age.

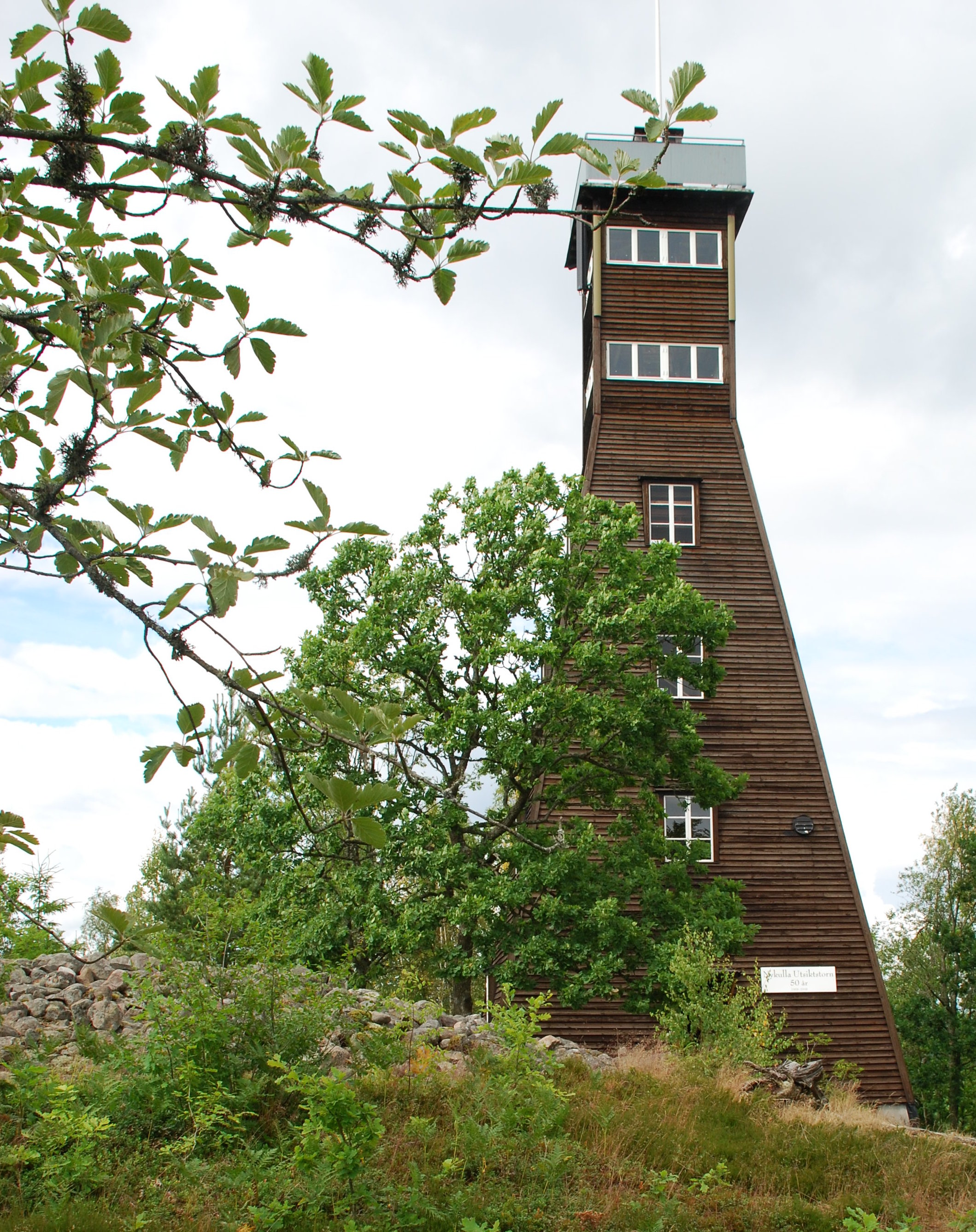
Nykulla observation tower

The town also features the only observation tower in Kronoberg County. There is a local museum inside it. The tower was built in 1958, with the two highest stories added in 1960. It is 25 metres tall, and the highest level is 258 metres above mean sea level. In 2008 the tower was used as TV studio for Hej hej sommar, a children's TV programme in the Sommarlovsmorgon series.

== Sources ==
- Eniro Maps
- Website of Tjureda hembygdsförening who own the observation tower
- Nykulla's website
