= Bankston (surname) =

Bankston is a surname. Notable people with the surname include:

- Bill Bankston (1893–1970), American baseball player
- Carl L. Bankston (born 1952), American sociologist and writer
- Christine Fulwylie-Bankston (1916–1998), American educator and civil rights activist
- Kevin Bankston (born 1974), American attorney and activist
- King Louie Bankston (1973–2022), American musician
- Kris Bankston (born 1999), American basketball player in the Israeli Basketball Premier League
- Larry S. Bankston (born 1951), American lawyer and politician
- Mark Bankston (fl. 2020s), American lawyer
- Michael Bankston (born 1970), American football player
- Warren Bankston (born 1947), American football player
- Wes Bankston (born 1983), American baseball player

== See also ==
- Bengtsson
- Bankson (disambiguation)
