= Izzy Young =

Noted figure in the world of folk music in America and Sweden

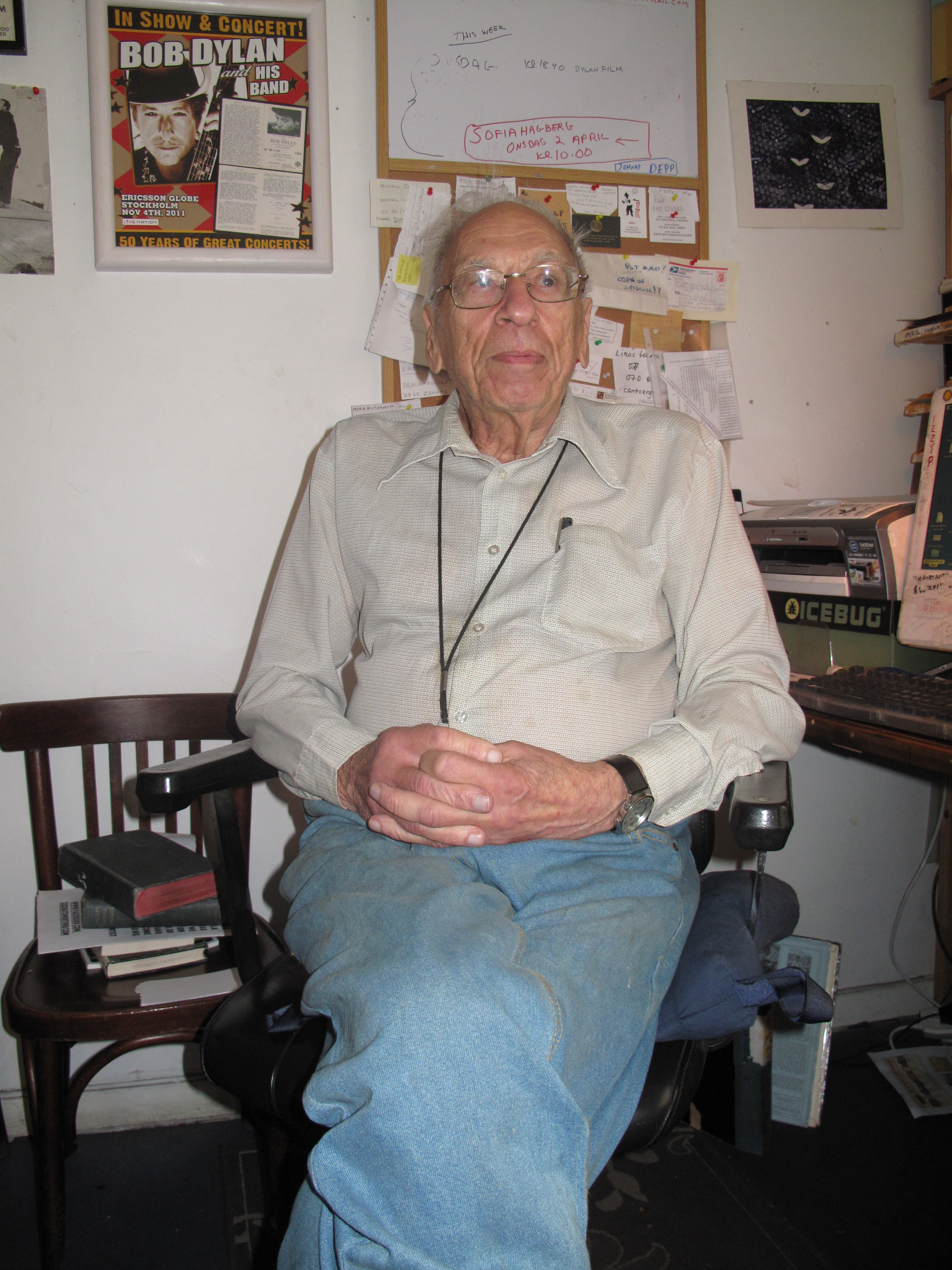
- Izzy Young sitting in his store in Stockholm, Sweden on August 29, 2014
- Born: Israel Goodman Young; March 26, 1928; Manhattan, New York City, U.S.
- Died: February 4, 2019 (aged 90); Stockholm, Sweden
- Occupations: folkloricist, author, producer
- Known for: proprietor of the Folklore Center, Greenwich Village, New York City
- Children: Philomène Grandin
- Parent(s): Philip Young; Pola Young

Israel Goodman Young (March 26, 1928 – February 4, 2019), known as Izzy Young, was a noted figure in the world of folk music, both in America and Sweden. He was once the owner of the Folklore Center in Greenwich Village, New York, and from 1973 until his death, owned and operated the Folklore Centrum store in Stockholm.

== Biography ==
Israel Goodman Young was born on March 26, 1928, at the Lower East Side of Manhattan, to Polish Jewish immigrant parents, Philip and Pola Young. His father was a baker. Izzy Young grew up in the Bronx where he finished high school. He attended Brooklyn College. From 1948 to 1952 he worked in his father's bakery in Brooklyn. He later went into the book business.

In 1957, at 110 MacDougal Street in New York City's Greenwich Village, he opened the Folklore Center, a store for books and records and everything related to folk music. It became a focal point for the American folk music scene of the time, a place where one could find such limited circulation publications as Caravan and Gardyloo, both edited and published by Lee Hoffman. From 1959 to 1969, Young wrote a column entitled "Fret and Frails" for the folk music journal Sing Out. He served on the "editorial advisory board" for the magazine until his departure for Sweden a few years later.

Young arranged concerts with folk musicians and songwriters, who often made contacts with other musicians at the Folklore Center. Bob Dylan relates in his memoirs, Chronicles, how he spent time at the Center, where Young allowed him to sit in the backroom of the store, listening to folk music records and reading books. Dylan met Dave Van Ronk in the store, and Young produced Dylan's first concert at Carnegie Chapter Hall in New York City on Saturday, November 4, 1961. Bob Dylan wrote a song about the store and Young entitled "Talking Folklore Center". Young gave interviews about their relationship for the documentary No Direction Home.

Other notable figures that played concerts early in their career at the Folklore Center include Peter Paul and Mary, John Sebastian from the Lovin' Spoonful (Young managed one of Sebastian’s early bands), Joni Mitchell, Emmylou Harris and Tim Buckley. A live album by Buckley recorded at the Folklore Centre in 1967 was released in 2009. Patti Smith used to read poetry there and also became friends with Young.

Young was also a keen political activist. He famously led a march in 1961, which became known as “the beatnik riot” in protest at a ban on the public performance of music in Greenwich Village’s Washington Square Park. Young pursued the case through the courts, eventually winning the removal of the ban. He would later champion the plight of Cambodians affected by the US war in Vietnam as well as Palestinians.

== Move to Sweden ==
After developing an interest in Swedish folk music at a festival, Young closed his New York store in 1973 and moved to Stockholm where he opened the Folklore Centrum at Roslagsgatan in Vasastan. In 1986 he relocated the store to Wollmar Yxkullsgatan 2 in Södermalm where he remained till the end of 2018 when he retired from a regular series of folk music concerts spanning decades. The concerts featured prominent traditional Swedish folk musicians, enthusiasts from Stockholm who played music from other places, and international artists from all over the world. In 1974 Young arranged a concert with Pete Seeger in the auditorium of Uppsala University. A recording was made and released on the LP record "If A Revolution Comes To My Country ..." (October Stereo OSLP-508). Young's personal diaries, notes, photos, newspaper clips, and other documentation have been transferred to the Library of Congress in Washington, D.C., where they now constitute The Izzy Young Collection. A large part of Young's extensive library was in 2018 donated to the museum Mannaminne at Nordingrå, Sweden. Young's research and documentation of Cambodia's history from the 1960s onwards was donated in 2001 to the "Centre for East and South-East Asian Studies" at Lund University (the HT libraries).

Young celebrated his 90th birthday at the Swedish Folklore Centrum in March 2018. At that time Young remarkably was still opening the “store” on a daily basis and hosting regular concerts there in the same way he had for over 60 years. Due to Young’s fading health, the store closed at the end of November.

== Personal life and death ==
He was the father of the actress and television presenter Philomène Grandin.

Israel "Izzy" Young died at the age of 90 in Stockholm, Sweden on February 4, 2019. He spent his last days surrounded by his family, closest friends, and live music.

Young's life and doings was portrayed in the book ”Don't Forget Me” (2021) and the documentary ”Go To Izzy!” (2021).

== Publications ==
- Young, Israel G., My Happy Life On Earth Seems But an Hour - The Poetry of Israel Goodman Young. © 2017 Israel G. Young. Edited by Rebecca Petra Naomi Seeman.
- Young, Israel G., I Like Folk Music - The Essays of Israel Goodman Young. © 2017 Israel G. Young. Edited by Rebecca Petra Naomi Seeman.
- Young, Israel G., The Conscience of the Folk Revival: The Writings of Israel "Izzy" Young, Edited by Scott Baretta © 2013 Scarecrow Press, Inc.
- Young, Israel G., One Night Stands - en square-dance kväll med Izzy Young. © 1983 Folklore Centrum.
- Young, Israel G., Autobiography * The Bronx * 1928-1938. Photographs by David Gahr, Introduction by Moses Asch, © 1969 Folklore Center Press, New York City.
