= Sound of Noise =

- Theatrical release poster
- Directed by: Ola Simonsson; Johannes Stjärne Nilsson
- Written by: Ola Simonsson; Johannes Stjärne Nilsson; Jim Birmant
- Produced by: Jim Birmant; Guy Péchard; Christophe Audeguis; Olivier Guerpillon
- Starring: Bengt Nilsson; Sanna Persson; Magnus Börjeson
- Cinematography: Charlotta Tengroth
- Edited by: Stefan Sundlöf
- Music by: Magnus Börjeson; Fred Avril
- Production companies: Bliss; Dfm Fiktion
- Distributed by: Nordisk Film (Sweden); Wild Bunch Distribution (France)
- Release dates: 18 May 2010 (Cannes); 25 December 2010 (Sweden); 29 December 2010 (France)
- Running time: 102 minutes
- Countries: Sweden; France
- Language: Swedish

Sound of Noise is a 2010 Swedish-French comedy-crime film written and directed by Ola Simonsson and Johannes Stjärne Nilsson. It tells the story of a group of musicians who illegally perform music on objects in the various institutions of a city. The film is a follow-up to Music for One Apartment and Six Drummers, the 2001 short film made by the same directors with the same basic concept. The title comes from the Italian futurist Luigi Russolo's 1913 manifesto The Art of Noises.

== Plot ==
A group of six anarchist drummers led by musician Sanna Persson and a conductor named Magnus set out to make music with objects that are generally considered non-musical. They plan out a concert with four humorously titled movements to be played across the city after carefully analyzing what objects can be used to make good music. All the while, the group is pursued by Amadeus Warnebring, a tone-deaf policeman born into a distinguished musical family who hates the sound of music.

The group begins by playing in a surgery room using a notable TV reporter who has been admitted to the hospital for hemorrhoid surgery. Their next piece is set in a bank where they ostensibly hold up the staff and customers. They then feed banknotes into the shredding machine for a distorted bass sound. The next piece uses bulldozers thumping the ground at the fountain in front of an opera house. For the crescendo, they strike the fountain knocking it to the ground. The last piece involves them hanging from high tension power cables and playing the suspended cables like violins.

Warnebring eventually comes to realize that the objects and people used by the anarchists as instruments are rendered silent to his ears after the fact, due to his tone-deafness. From this he forms a plan to force the drummers into using the entire city as an instrument by way of rhythmically controlling the power supply. The plan succeeds: Persson observes that the ambient sounds around her have become musical, while Warnebring can hear no such sounds. The film ends with the anarchists exiled from the city and performing as a lounge act while Warnebring enjoys a silent orchestral concert elsewhere.

== Cast ==
- Bengt Nilsson as Amadeus Warnebring
- Sanna Persson as Sanna Persson
- Magnus Börjeson as Magnus
- Marcus Haraldson Boij as Marcus
- Fredrik Myhr as Myran
- Anders Vestergård as Anders
- Johannes Björk as Johannes
- Sven Ahlström as Oscar Warnebring
- Ralph Carlsson as Hagman
- Paula McManus as Colette
- Peter Schildt as police commissioner
- Pelle Öhlund as Sanchez
- Dag Malmberg as Levander
- Björn Granath as hospital director
- Anders Jansson as Bosse

== Production ==
The music was composed for the film by Magnus Börjeson while the story was written by Fred Avril. Sound of Noise was initiated by BLISS from France. The film is a coproduction between BLISS and Dfm fiktion. It received ten million kronor from the Swedish Film Institute. The film was shot in CinemaScope and filming took place in Malmö from 28 July to 1 October 2008.

== Release ==
The film premiered on 18 May 2010 in the Critics' Week of the 63rd Cannes Film Festival. It has been released in Sweden on Christmas Day 2010 through Nordisk Film. Wild Bunch Distribution released it in France on 29 December 2010.

== Reception ==
=== Critical response ===
The film received a 91% rating on review aggregator website Rotten Tomatoes, with an average rating of 7.1/10 based on 23 critics. The website's critical consensus reads, "Sound of Noise is a raucous, irreverent comedy caper with good tunes and a romantic finish." On Metacritic, the film has an average score of 72 out of 100, based on 9 critics, indicating "generally favorable reviews".

Eric Kohn of IndieWire called Sound of Noise "Bonnie and Clyde on drums", writing, "Loaded with ingeniously devised beats, it hammers out a unique rhythm deserved of many repeat performances," and "directors Ola Simonsson and Johannes Stjärne make the surrealist musical set pieces into the real stars". He also praised the film's "wildly original soundtrack".

David DeWitt from The New York Times compared the film to the similarly percussive theatrical show Stomp, and called it "a character study mixed with outlandish crime procedural. Everyone’s quite serious about the joke, without a moment of Adam Sandler-style “look at how cute we are” that would only dilute the film's appeal. Sound of Noise is a dry treat — a solid, self-aware cult pleasure".

In her review of the film, Alissa Simon from Variety called it "a delightful comic cocktail of modern city symphony, police procedural and love story ... With the most complex and wackily staged musical numbers since Marc Caro and Jean-Pierre Jeunet’s Delicatessen, the pic was far more demanding to make than it is to watch". She noted that "critical praise and savvy marketing could transform sure-fire fest crowd-pleaser into a niche arthouse success in most markets".

Peter Brunette of The Hollywood Reporter called the basic premise of the film "one of the most imaginative you'll ever see. It's all based on music—raw, elemental and percussive—out of which genuine laughs are wrung from beginning to end." He noted the film's "understated but cute rom-com aspect", and described the sketches as "brilliantly conceptualized and faultlessly executed. The editing and sound mix are snappy, and delightful animations perk up the film visually. Sound of Noise may be small in scope, but, in terms of imagination, it's huge." He similarly commented that "the right niche distributor might coax some modest profits" from the film.

=== Accolades ===
Sound of Noise received the Young Critics Award and the Grand Rail d'Or at the Critics' Week. As the festival run continued, it won the prize for Best Fantastic Film at Fantastic Fest in Austin. It also won the Free Spirit Award and the Audience Award at the 2010 Warsaw International Film Festival. At the Molodist International Film Festival in Kyiv, the film received both the award for Best Full-length Film and the Audience Prize. It won a Best Achievement Guldbagge Award for "a virtuous mergence of sound and music".
