= Nic & the Family =

Swedish pop group

- Origin: Helsingborg, Sweden
- Genres: Pop
- Years active: 2003–2005, 2024
- Labels: Warner
- Members: Nic Schröder; Axel Al Areas; Putte Rock; April May; Frida Worl; Stellan Motväggen

Nic & the Family is a Swedish pop group formed in 2004 in Helsingborg. They are best known for their hit song Hej Hej Monika, from their only album Hej Hej Skiva.

== Discography ==
=== Album ===
Year	Title	SWE
2004	Hej Hej Skiva	37

=== Singles ===
Year	Title	SWE
2004	"Hej Hej Monika"	1
2004	"Hej, det är Nic... klick"	42
2004	"Jag är kärleken"	—
2025	"Djungelvrål"	— (Note: "Djungelvrål" did not enter the Swedish singles chart, but peaked at number seven on the Swedish Heatseeker chart.)
