= Sandra Dahlberg =

Swedish/Sami singer

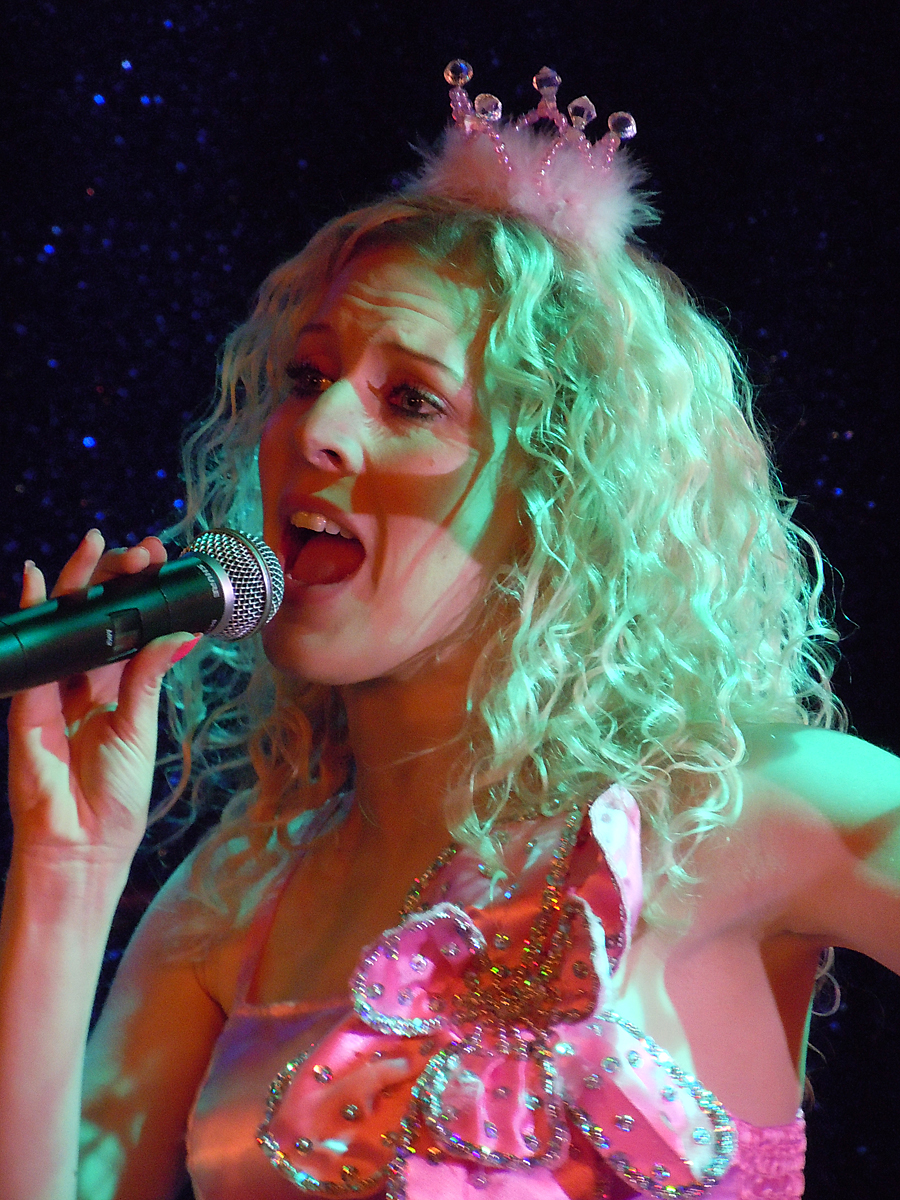
- Dahlberg in 2010

Background information
- Born: Maria Sandra Marlene Dahlberg; 13 March 1979 (age 46); Klimpfjäll, Sweden
- Occupation: singer

Maria Sandra Marlene Dahlberg (born 13 March 1979) is a Swedish/Sami singer. She sings a mix of folk and pop music and has had hits as "Kom hem hel igen", "Här stannar jag kvar" (which she performed in Melodifestivalen 2004 and finished in 8th place) and "Jag tar det jag vill ha" (which she performed in Melodifestivalen 2006). In 2004, she released her album Här stannar jag kvar.

In 2008, she hosted the "Summer break morning" program Hej hej sommar.

In 2009, Dahlberg competed in the TV4 program Hjälp! Jag är med i en japansk tv-show.

Dahlberg was born in Klimpfjäll. She has a son called Vilmer (born 12 February 2007) with her former fiancé Jimmy Jansson (separated in 2010).
