= Petter Bragée =

Film director, producer and screenwriter

- Born: Björn Petter Bragée; 10 September 1968 (age 57); Sweden
- Occupations: Screenwriter, Director, Film producer
- Years active: 2000-presents

Björn Petter Bragée (born 10 September 1968) is a Swedish film director, film producer and screenwriter, well known as director for the Vintergatan series. He has also produced among the TV series Landgång.

Bragée received Ollénpriset ("The Ollén Award") in 2005.
