= Hej hej Monika =

Single by Nic & the Family

from the album Hej Hej Skiva
- Language: Swedish
- B-side: "Hej hej Monika" (Instrumental)
- Released: 2004
- Genre: Pop
- Length: 2:28
- Label: Warner
- Songwriter(s): Joey Demo; Nancy Blond; Nic Schröder

Nic & the Family singles chronology
"Hej hej Monika" (2004)	"Hej Det Är Nic ... Klick" (2004)

"Hej hej Monika" is the debut single by Swedish pop band Nic & the Family from their only album Hej Hej Skiva. The song was written by Nicolaj Schröder, as well as the Sounds members Maja Ivarsson and Felix Rodriguez (under the pseudonyms Nancy Blond and Joey Demo, respectively). The song was released as a single shortly after the album's release.

The song reached number one on the Swedish Singles Chart and remained there for three weeks, before falling to number two, and rising back to the top position the following week. The song was number one for a total of four weeks (three of them consecutive), and remained on the charts for a total of 25 weeks. In 2006, Swedish newspaper Aftonbladet called it one of the worst summer hits of the decade.

The song was brought to international attention after Swedish YouTuber PewDiePie (Felix Kjellberg) mentioned and sang the song in one of his videos on December 12, 2017, in reference to the character Monika from the video game Doki Doki Literature Club. In response to the popularity, PewDiePie uploaded a cover of the song by Party In Backyard on January 27, 2018, which has since received over 46 million views as of September 2022. Since then, PartyInBackyard has released an additional house remix featuring PewDiePie on June 20, 2018, which has received over 492 thousand views as of January 2023.

== Charts ==
Chart (2004)	Peak position
Swedish Singles Chart	1
Svensktoppen	10
Trackslistan	10
