= Åmål =

Place in Dalsland, Sweden

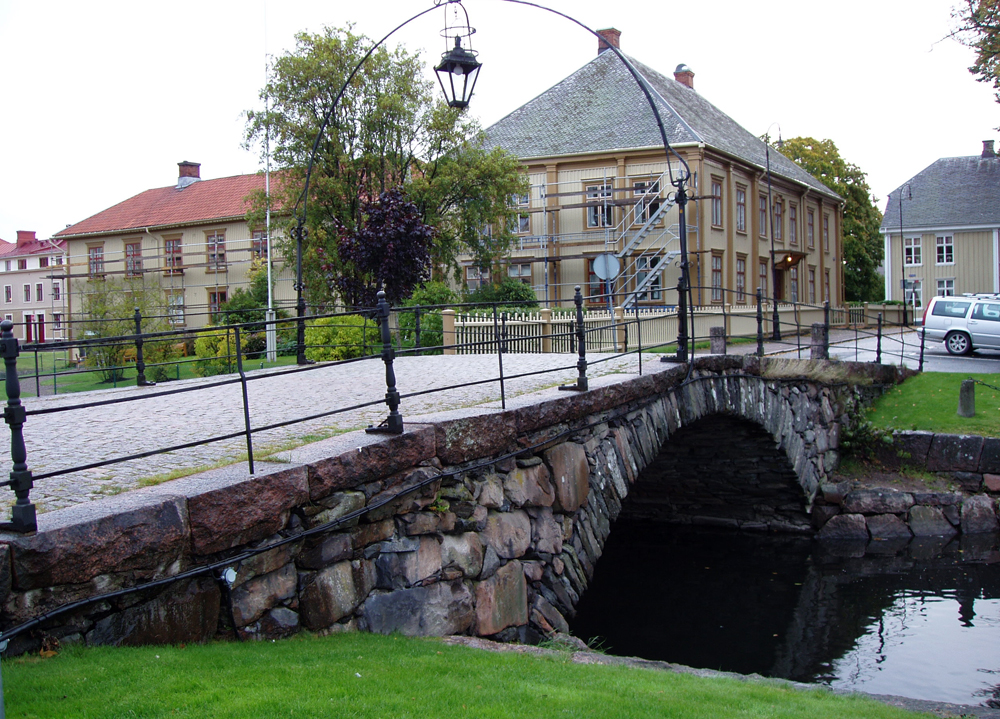
- Central Åmål

- Location within Västra Götaland Location within Sweden
- Coordinates: 59°03′N 12°42′E
- Country: Sweden
- Province: Dalsland
- County: Västra Götaland County
- Municipality: Åmål Municipality

Area
  - Total: 7.54 km^{2} (2.91 sq mi)

Population (31 December 2010)
  - Total: 9,065
  - Density: 1,203/km^{2} (3,120/sq mi)
- Time zone: UTC+1 (CET)
  - Summer (DST): UTC+2 (CEST)
- Climate: Dfb

Åmål (Swedish pronunciation: [ˈǒːmɔl]) is a locality and the seat of Åmål Municipality in Västra Götaland County, Sweden with 9,065 inhabitants in 2010. It is situated on the western shore of Vänern.

In 2005 Åmål received second prize in the international competition The International Awards for Liveable Communities (also known as the LivCom Awards). The Åmåls Blues Fest has been held annually in Åmål since 1992.

== History ==
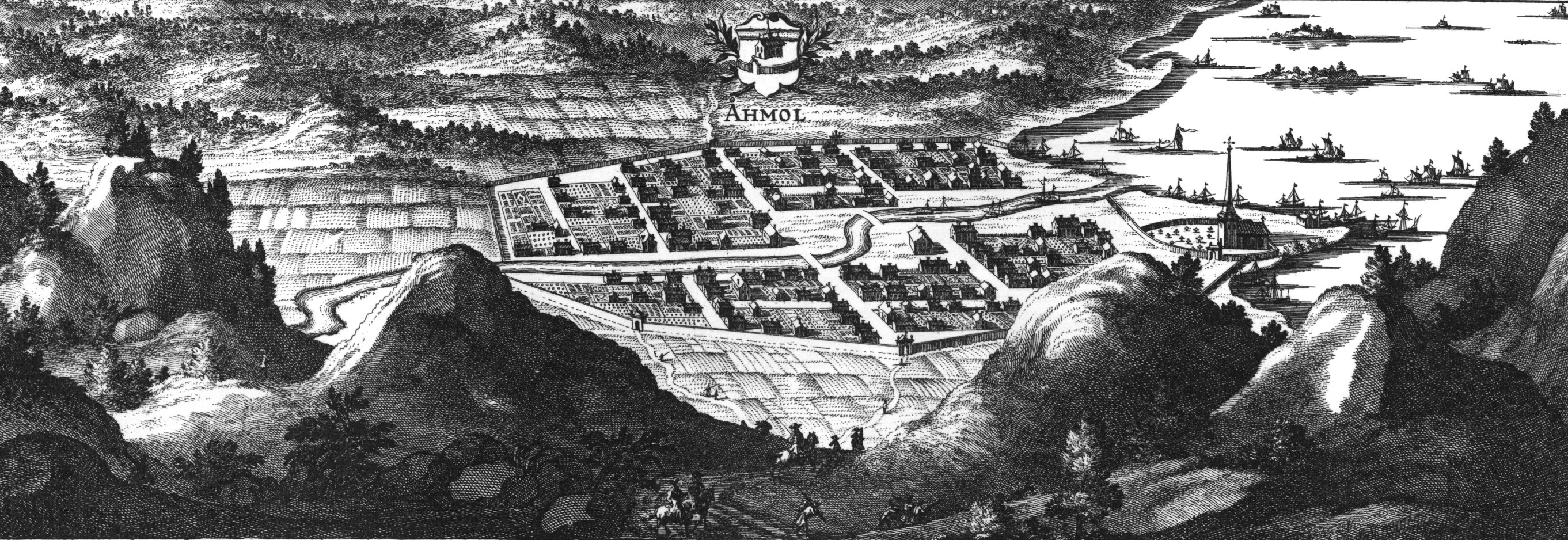
An engraving of a somewhat idealised view of Åmal in Suecia Antiqua et Hodierna, from 1708.

Åmål was founded in the 17th century by Queen Christina, and became one of the now defunct Cities of Sweden on April 1, 1643, and the only city in the historical province of Dalsland. Its location close to the borders of the Denmark-Norway alliance made it vulnerable to attack and it accordingly suffered over the ensuing centuries: first in 1645, when it was almost completely demolished, again in 1676 and 1679; and the last time in 1788 when it was conquered by the Danes, who then held it for a short while.

The town suffered devastating fires in 1777, 1809, 1846 and 1901. After the last severe fire in 1901, whereby 1000 people became homeless, and one third of the city was burnt to the ground, it was rebuilt with wider streets and larger houses in a Jugend style of architecture. The area of wooden houses, the so-called Plantaget, south of the river, the Åmålsån, that runs through the town into the lake, was spared by the fire and today forms the "old town" area.

== Show Me Love (Fucking Åmål) ==
The 1998 movie Fucking Åmål (known in the English-speaking world as Show Me Love), directed by Lukas Moodysson, is set in Åmål. The movie depicts the town as extremely boring and it was largely filmed in the nearby town of Trollhättan. The film created controversy in the town of Åmål. Local politicians campaigned to get the title of the film changed. The local complaints had no effect on the content or release of the film and since the release of the film the town of Åmål has even tried to embrace the publicity generated. In the early 2000s the town founded the pop music festival "Fucking Åmål Festival".

== Sports ==
The following sports clubs are located in Åmål:

- IF Viken
- IFK Åmål

== Notable people ==
- Rut Berglund, (1897 in Åmål – 1984) operatic mezzo-soprano and contralto
- Egzon Binaku (born 1995 in Åmål) footballer, for IFK Norrköping
- Anders Fryxell (1795 in Edsleskog – 1881) historian and writer.
- Bengtolle Oldinger (1911 in Åmål –1988), born as Bengt Anders Valter Oldinger, painter
- Karl Gustav Jöreskog (born 1935 in Åmål) statistician.
- Amy Segerstedt (1835 in Åmål – 1928) teacher, folk teacher, and philanthropist

== See also ==
- Åmål Municipality
