= Åmåls Blues Fest =

Blues festival in Åmål, Sweden

Åmåls Blues Fest is a blues festival in Åmål, Sweden. The festival is usually held in July. The Blues Fest is a four-day international blues festival that has grown into Sweden's foremost since its inception in 1992.
