= Bengt Andersson =

Bengt Andersson may refer to:

- Bengt Andersson (canoeist) (born 1961), Swedish canoeist
- Bengt Andersson (footballer, born 1966), Swedish footballer and football coach
- Bengt Andersson (sport shooter) (born 1966), Swedish sport shooter
- Bengt Andersson (Malmö FF footballer), Swedish footballer for Malmö FF, 1959–60
- Bengt Andersson (Swedish officer) (born 1955)

== See also ==
- Bengt Andersson Qvist (1729–1799), Swedish chemist and mineralogist
