= Nic Schröder =

Swedish actor

Nicolaj Schröder (born 14 February 1980 in Helsingborg) is a Swedish actor, singer and TV host. He studied at Fridhems folkhögskola between 2005 and 2007.

As a singer, Nic has been member of the band Nic & the Family who are famous for their song "Hej Hej Monika" which they released in 2004 on their disc Hej hej skiva. The song was voted as "årtiondets värsta sommarplåga" ("the worst summer hit of this decade") in 2006.

Nic hosted the "Summer holiday Morning" programs Hej hej sommar 2006–07 (and also in 2008) and Sommarlov 09 in 2009, then together with Ola Selmén. He and Ola also hosted the program Stressa ner which had premiere in SVT B on 16 December 2008.
