= Bengston =

Bengston is a surname. Notable people with the surname include:

- Billy Al Bengston (1934–2022), American artist and sculptor
- Nelson Bengston (1905–1986), American businessman

== See also ==
- Bengtsson
