= Philomène Grandin =

Swedish actress and television host

- Born: 23 September 1974 (age 51); Stockholm, Sweden
- Occupations: Actress; television host
- Spouse: Lars Demian
- Children: 2
- Father: Izzy Young

Philomène Grandin (born 23 September 1974, in Stockholm) is a Swedish actress and television host. She is the daughter of Izzy Young, the folk music expert. She works at theatres and participates in TV series. She is married to the musician Lars Demian. They have two children.

She studied at the Ecole Int. de theatre Jaques Lecoq, Paris 1992–1994. Grandin has since performed in many Swedish films, television programmes and theatre productions. She hosted the children's television show Philofix in 2008.

== Filmography ==
- 1995 - Jag heter Mitra
- 2000 – Vintergatan 5a (TV)
- 2001 – Anderssons älskarinna
- 2001 – Vintergatan 5b (TV)
- 2003 – Kvinnor emellan
- 2003 – Tillbaka till Vintergatan (TV)
- 2004 – Min f.d. familj
- 2008 – Om ett hjärta
- 2008 – Värsta vännerna (TV)
- 2010 – Vid Vintergatans slut (TV)
- 2010 - Trust Me
