= Hej hej sommar =

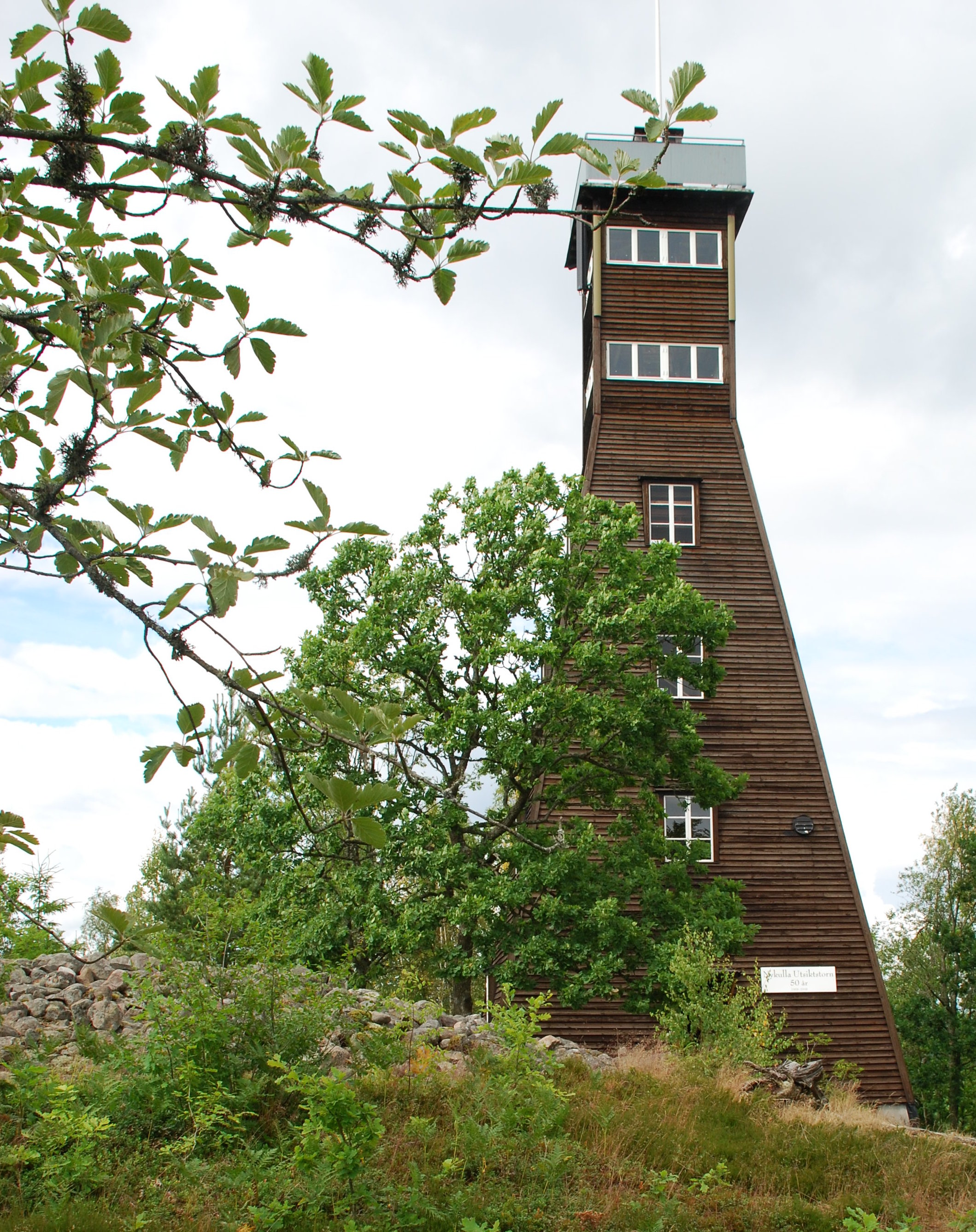
- The view tower, located in Nykulla, which was used as Hej hej sommar-studio in 2008.
- Presented by: Nic Schröder (2006–07); Sandra Dahlberg and "Svante" (and Nic Schröder) (2008)
- No. of seasons: 3

Original release
- Network: SVT
- Release: 2006 – 2008

Hej hej sommar ("Hi Hi Summer") was the "Sommarlovsmorgon" program in Sveriges Television during the summers of 2006–08. It was hosted by Nic Schröder 2006–07 and by Sandra Dahlberg and "Svante" (and Nic Schröder) in 2008.

Here is the lyrics of the theme music of the program:
Hej hej sommar! [Hej hej sommar] Hej hej sommar! [Hej hej sommar]
Vi ska bada, sola, bada, sola, bada tills tårna domnar
Hej hej sommar! [Hej hej sommar] Hej hej sommar! [Hej hej sommar]
Hur ska jag kunna slappa när hjärtat det klappar
Hej hej sommar! [Kulning (Sandra)]

A few things were changed in the theme music: In 2006 Nic and people he met on his driving way sang, but in 2007 he sang the whole song alone. Sandra did also sing the whole song alone, and in the end she "kulade" at a cow pasture.

== 2006 ==
During the summer of 2006, Nic had "stolen" "Hej hej-sändningsbussen" ("The Hi Hi Broadcast bus") from SVT and drove around in Sweden and from the bus he broadcast films and TV series, among them Flyg 29 saknas (except the 4 last parts), Hydronauterna, Plums and Emblas hemlighet. He also arranged competitions for the watchers. On Fridays he arranged water competitions at water parks and was guested by some famous people.

Hej hej sommar was broadcast Monday–Friday 9.15am 19 June–11 August 2006.

== 2007 ==
In 2007 Nic owned Vägrenens camping (real name Sjöatorps camping), located at Hjortsberga. He lived there in "Hej hej studion" ("The Hi Hi Studio") where he broadcast TV series and films, among them Blue Water High, Tintin, Fåret Shaun, Morden i midsommar, Flyg 29 saknas, Unge Greve Dracula, Äventyr i Anderna and Lillas smågodis. He arranged competitions for the watchers and on Fridays he arranged water competitions in a water park connected to the camping.

A new thing from 2007 is that "Sommarlovsmorgon" programmes are broadcast again at evening, but it's not possible to participate in competition in evening since the main program which is broadcast in morning is past.

Hej hej sommar was broadcast Monday–Friday 9.15am & 6.30pm 11 June–17 August 2007.

== 2008 ==
In 2008 Sandra Dahlberg hosted the program, and Nic was the main character in the TV series Det femte väderstrecket broadcast by Sandra. Sandra and Nic worked for "Sektion SG" ("Sektion för särskilt granskande"), "Section of special investigation". Sandra moved into a studio tower where she broadcast TV series and films, but she didn't know that a guy called Svante (real name Melker Henningsson) lived in the tower.

Hej hej sommar was broadcast Monday–Friday 9.15am & 6.30pm 9 June–15 August 2008. The TV series and films which were broadcast were Planet Sketch, Philofix, Blue Water High, Unge Greve Dracula, Värsta vännerna, Sune and Lillas smågodis. On Fridays Sandra and Svante arranged competitions for the watchers.
