= Sanna Persson =

Swedish actress and comedian

- Born: Susanna Persson Halapi; 18 August 1974 (age 52); Kävlinge, Sweden
- Occupations: Actress; comedian

Susanna "Sanna" Persson Halapi (born 18 August 1974 in Kävlinge, Sweden) is a Swedish comedian and actress.

Persson began her career as a comedian in a Lund student comedy ensemble. She belonged to the first generation of the female ensemble Boelspexarna and has also participated in several carnivals, including a major role in the carnival film "The Handyman and the Professor" (2002).

In Sweden, she is probably best known from the TV series "HippHipp" (in which she played Lithuanian Jolanta, hostess of "Swedish Celebrity Travels"), "Extra allt" and "Anders och Måns". Together with the actors in the latter programme, Anders Johansson and Måns Nilsson, she has also played dinner shows in Malmö, and hosted the inauguration of Malmö Festival 2005. Sanna performed in the ensemble "Humorkollektivet Ivan Lendl" for a while together with Josephine Johansson and Måns and Anders.

Persson has also played serious roles, including in Jan Troell's "Så vit som en snö", a production of Joyce Carol Oates's play Naked and the docudrama "Hjärtats oro" about Hjalmar Bergman. At New Year 2005/06 Persson appeared in "En sorts nyårskabaré" in Malmö together with Mikael Wiehe and Gonzalo del Rio Saldias. At Christmas 2006, she participated in HippHipp's "Itzhaks julevangelium" advent calendar on SVT, and in autumn 2007 she appeared in the play "Kalla det vad fan du vill" at the Malmö Dramatic Theater. Amongst younger audiences, she is very well known for playing the character of Pax in Pax's Earthy Adventures. Her notable body of works include:

- 2002-2003 Anders & Måns på krogen, manus och medverkan, Konsthallen Malmö samt turné, manus och

medverkan, producent Stellan Colt

- 2003-2005 Naken av Joyce Carol Oates, fem monologer, Teater Delirium, Teater 23, Helsingborgs

stadsteater, regi Gabriel Flores

- 2003-2004 Hipp Hipp paw rikhtit på Olympen i Lund, Jolanta, producent United Stage
- 2006 En slags kabaret, manus och diverse karaktär, med Mikael Wiehe och Emil Jensen, Slagthuset Malmö
- 2008 Kalla det vad fan du vill, diverse roller, regi Anna Sjövall, Malmö Stadsteater
- 2010 Jensen&Persson, föreställning med Emil Jensen, manus och diverse karaktärer, Victoriateatern Malmö

samt turné

- 2010-2024 Otaliga samarbeten med Anagram Live, Lund Comedy festival, skrattlunch, företagsgig mm.
- 2012-2013 Kal P Dal, musikal, Lotta Love, mossan m fl, Slagthuset Malmö, regi Katarina Sörensen, Robert

Lillhonga, producent Totte Lundgren KB

- 2015-2018 Konferencier och artist, tio olika konserter med Malmö Symfoniorkester, Malmö Live, producent

Anna Modéer Wiking

- 2016-17 Filifjonkan som trodde på katastrofer, av Tove Jansson, regi Ada Berger, Unga Malmö Stadsteater &

Unga Dramaten Stockholm

- 2017 Föreställning och turné med Six Drummers, trummis, Operaverkstan, Malmö Opera
- 2018 The play that goes wrong, av Mischief Theatre Company, regi Sven Melander, Nöjesteatern

Malmö, Lorensborgsteatern Göteborg

- 2019 Historiska systrar, av Emma Boström, diverse roller, regi Py Huss-Wallin, Malmö Stadsteater
- 2001-2020 Diverse turnéer och konserter med Six drummers, Ryssland, Mexico, USA, Frankrike mm
- 2021 Diverse guidade bussresor med reseledarkaraktären Jolanta, Ystad & Lund
- 2021-2022 Rymdrytmik med Karin & Pax, manus och Pax, barnföreställning, Musik i Syd, Musik i Norr
- 2022-23 En midsommarnattsdröm, hantverkare, regi Sara Cronberg, Malmö Stadsteater
- 2023-24, Kejsarens nya kläder, kejsarens stylist, regi Viktor Tjerneld, Malmö Stadsteater
- 2024, Fredriksdalsteatern Nötter, huvudroll Lillemor, regi & manus Adde Malmberg
- 2024, Helikopterrevyn En bättre utsikt, av och med Kalle Lind, manus och diverse roller, regi Helena Röhr
- 2024, Malmös finest JULSHOW, Radisson, manus och medverkan tillsammans med Anders Jansson, Fritte

Fritzson & Susanna Dzamic

She married her husband Lars Halapi in 2006.

== Selected filmography ==
- 1999 – Herr Pendel (en: Mr. Pendel)
- 2001 – Music For One Apartment And Six Drummers
- 2001 – Så vit som en snö (en: As White as a snow)
- 2002 – Hotel Rienne
- 2002 – Hjärtats oro (en: The Hearts Worry) (TV series)
- 2002 – Vaktmästaren och professorn (en: The Janitor and the Professor)
- 2006 – Itzhaks julevangelium (TV series)
- 2006 – Kvinna vid grammofon (en: Woman Next to the Phonograph)
- 2007 – Hej rymden! (en: Hello space!) (TV series)
- 2010 – Vid Vintergatans slut (en: At the End of the Milky Way) (TV series)
- 2010 – Sound of Noise
- 2012 – Mysteriet på Greveholm – Grevens återkomst (en: The Mystery at Greveholm –The Return of the Graf) (TV series)
- 2013 – Gabba Gabba, manus och medverkan, SVT. (TV series)
- 2014 – Halvvägs till himlen, Kristina, Anagram, TV4, regi Leif Lindblom. (en: Halfway to Heaven) (TV series)
- 2014 – Är det sant?, Anna Ankare, utbildningsprogram för mellanstadiet, UR, SVT, regi Mikaela Perier (en: Is that true?) (TV series)
- 2016 – Skolan, lärare, Anagram, TV3, regi Anders Lenhoff (en: School, Teachers, Anagrams) (TV series)
- 2011–2017 – Tre säsonger av Pax jordiska äventyr, SVT Barn, manus & huvudroll, regi Petter Bragée (en: Three seasons of Pax's Earthy Adventures) (TV series)
- 2017 – Tripp Trapp Träd, Råtta, utbildningsprogram för små barn, UR, SVT, regi Mikaela Perier (en: Tripp Trapp Tree, Rat, educational program for young children, UR, SVT, directed by Mikaela Perier.) (TV series)
- 2018 – 2021 Mysteriet på Barnkanalen, Dr Skarp, Pax, SVT Barn, regi Janne Persson (en: The Mystery on the Children's Channel, Dr Skarp, Pax, SVT Children, directed by Janne Persson)
- 2021 – En helt vanlig familj, fängelsepsykolog Shirin, Netflix, regi Per Hanefjord (en:A Nearly Normal Family) (TV series)
- 2022 – Hålla samman, Paula, Anagram, SVT, dramakomedi, regi Maria Blom (en: Keep it Together, Paula, Anagram, SVT, Dramatic Comedy directed by Maria Blom) (TV series)
- 2023 – Hack My Heart, rektor, SVT, regi Max Tellving (en: Hack My Heart, Principal, SVT, director Max Tellving) (TV series)
- 2024 – Tabitas tattoo and cär, manus och medverkan som Jeanett, Polpo play, TV4, regi Isabella Rodriguez (en: Tabitha's Tattoo, Script and Role as Jeanett, Polpo Play, TV4, directed by Isabella Rodriguez) (TV series)
- 2024 – Beata blev en djungel, Beata, kortfilm, Anagram, regi Stephanie Hayes (en: Beata Became a Jungle, Beata, short film, Anagram, directed by Stephanie Hayes) (TV series)
- 2025 – Anne-Marie väljer glädje, psykolog, Polpo Play, SVT, manus och regi Mia Skäringer & Lousie Hammar (en: Anne-Marie Chooses Happiness, psychologist, Polpo Play, SVT, script and direction by Mia Skäringer & Lousie Hammar) (TV series)
