= Music For One Apartment And Six Drummers =

2001 art movie

- Artists: Ola Simonsson; Johannes Stjärne Nilsson
- Year: 2001
- Medium: Art film Conceptual; Rock and art
- Movement: Contemporalism

Music For One Apartment And Six Drummers is an art movie, a found music video, and a conceptual short film released in 2001 by Ola Simonsson and Johannes Stjärne Nilsson It depicts a group of musicians performing their piece in a vacant apartment using various day-to-day objects to create the music.

== Plot ==
Four men and a woman are sitting in a car with one man leaning against the car outside. One of the men is briefly looking at a map. When the time is right, after an old couple, seemingly on their way out to walk the dog, can be seen leaving the apartment complex in the background, the crew leaves the car heading for the apartment building.

The crew proceeds to an apartment lockpicking their way into it and moves to each room of the apartment playing music on objects found in each room. The whole procedure is timed to the clock by a wristwatch worn by one of the musicians. The old couple then gets back from their walk while the musicians are still in the apartment.

== Instruments ==
The music starts lowkey in the kitchen with the musicians seemingly focused on the task at hand with no excessive instruments used. The music is then intensified, going into the bedroom and bathroom, and then culminates when in the living room which shows on the musicians faces and in their gestures. This can also be seen in the mood the music is made in - from the stringent use of kitchen utensils to the overblown mess in the living room using books thrown on the floor from the shelf as instrument. This is done to the extent that the musicians seemingly lose control of time as they have just stopped performing, with no time to exit, when the old pair gets back to the apartment.

== Cast ==
- Sanna Persson as Sanna
- Magnus Börjeson as Magnus
- Marcus Haraldson Boij as Marcus
- Fredrik Myhr as Myran
- Anders Vestergård as Anders
- Johannes Björk as Johannes
- Barbro Gustafson Löfgren as The Woman
- Zerby Thor as The Man
- Anders Jansson as The TV-Man

== Awards ==
Music For One Apartment And Six Drummers won the 2001 Guldbagge Award for best short film.

== Sequel ==
Sound of Noise is a feature-length sequel by the same directors and with the same musicians.
