= Bengt Simonsen =

Bengt Simonsen might refer to:

- Bengt Simonsen (racewalker) (born 1958), Swedish racewalker
- Bengt Simonsen (football) (born 1945), Swedish football (soccer) coach
