= Margot Bengtsson =

Swedish psychologist

- Born: 1943 (age 82–83)
- Scientific career
- Fields: Psychology
- Institutions: Lund University
- Thesis: Föräldraidentifikation hos kvinnliga naturvetare och humanister: utvecklingspsykologiska, differentiella och socialpsykologiska aspekter (1983)

Margot Bengtsson (born 1943) is a Swedish psychologist and Reader in Psychology at Lund University. She is known for her research in developmental, social, feminist and critical psychology, especially her research on gender, power, identity and social class.

Bengtsson earned her PhD in psychology at Lund University in 1983 and was appointed as a Reader in Applied Psychology at Lund University in 1986. Her early work "focused on how society's needs for women to enter the workforce co-varied with trends in psychological research about sex differences." Her later work has "pursued the interactions between larger political changes and changes in gendered identities of Swedish young people."

== Selected publications ==
- Feminism och psykologi, Studentlitteratur, 2017, ISBN 9789144108971
- Tid, rum, kön och identitet; om föräldraidentifikationens omvandlingar 1959-1993, Studentlitteratur, 2001, ISBN 978-91-44-01671-9
- Könssocialisation och social förändring, 1990
- Om maskulinitet; mannen som forskningsprojekt (with Jonas Frykman), 1987
- Makt och kön (ed.), 1986
- Identifikation, kön och klass, 1983
- "Det personliga är politiskt - en berättelse om hur jag upplevt kvinnorörelsen", in Ord & bild 86(1977):2/3
