= Kevin Bankston =

American activist and attorney (born 1974)

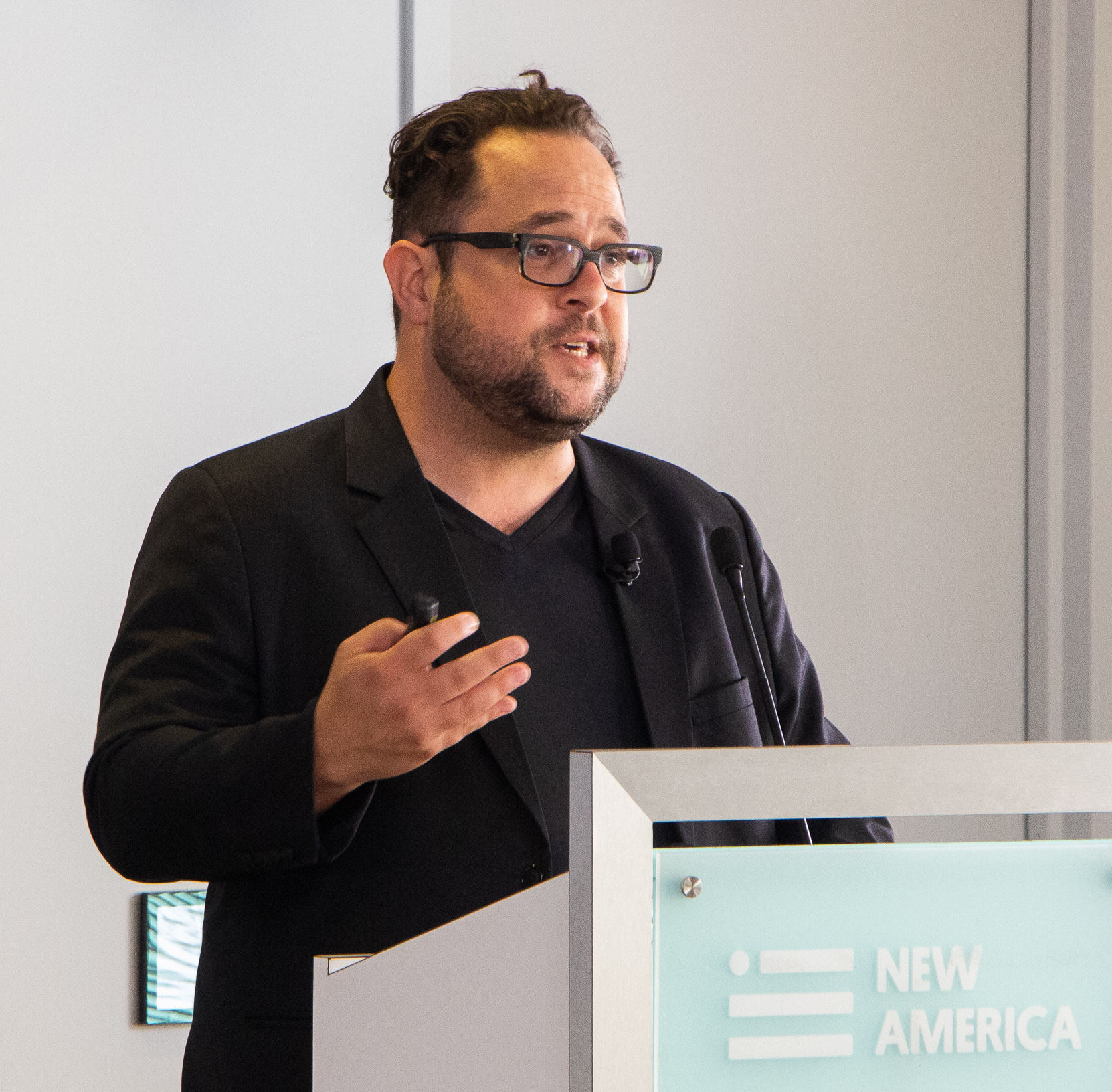
- Born: Kevin Stuart Bankston; July 2, 1974 (age 51)
- Education: University of Texas, Austin (BA); University of Southern California (JD)
- Occupation: Lawyer

Kevin Stuart Bankston (born July 2, 1974) is an American attorney who specializes in the areas of free speech and privacy law. He is currently the Senior Advisor on AI Governance at the Center for Democracy and Technology and previously was Privacy Policy Director at Facebook, where he leads policy work on AI and emerging technologies. He was formerly the director of the Open Technology Institute (OTI) at the New America Foundation in Washington, D.C.

== Education ==
Bankston earned a B.A. at the University of Texas at Austin. In 2001 he completed a Juris Doctor at the University of Southern California.

== Career ==
In his early career Bankston served, from 2001 until 2002, as a Justice William J. Brennan First Amendment Fellow for the American Civil Liberties Union (ACLU) in New York City. At the ACLU he litigated Internet-related free speech cases.

He then joined the Electronic Frontier Foundation in 2003 as an Equal Justice Works/Bruce J. Ennis Fellow. From 2003 until 2005 he studied the impact anti-terrorism-related surveillance initiatives had on online privacy and free speech after 9/11. At the EFF he specialized in free speech and privacy law and later became senior staff attorney. In the EFF's lawsuits against the National Security Agency (NSA) and AT&T where the lawfulness of the NSA's warrantless wiretapping program was challenged, Bankston was a lead counsel.

After working for almost ten years at the EFF Bankston joined the Center for Democracy & Technology (CDT) in Washington, D.C. in early 2012. As senior counsel and the director of the Free Expression Policy Project he advocated a variety of internet and technology policy issues at the Nonprofit organization. In November 2013 he spoke before the Senate Committee on the Judiciary, Subcommittee on Privacy, Technology and the Law on The Surveillance Transparency Act of 2013. He later became the director of the Open Technology Institute (OTI) at the New America Foundation in Washington DC.

Bankston is also an Adjunct Professor at the Georgetown University Law Center.

== Affiliations ==
- Since 2005 he serves on the board of the First Amendment Coalition, a non-profit public interest organization
- He was a nonresidential fellow at the Stanford Law School’s Center for Internet & Society

== Publications ==
- The Washington Post, Opinions: The books, films and John Oliver episodes that explain encryption (March 25, 2016)
- Just Security: It’s Time to End the "Debate" on Encryption Backdoors (July 7, 2015)
- Lawfare, encryption: Ending The Endless Crypto Debate: Three Things We Should Be Arguing About Instead of Encryption Backdoors (June 14, 2017)
- Electronic Frontier Foundation: EFF Analysis of the Security and Freedom Ensured Act (S. 1709) (October 30, 2003)
- CNN: A year after Edward Snowden, the real costs of NSA surveillance (Co-author with Danielle Kehl)
- While working for EFF, Bankston wrote dozens of articles for "Deeplinks Blog"
