= Jan-Olof Bengtsson =

Swedish journalist and political columnist

- Born: 1 September 1975 (age 50); Malmö, Sweden
- Occupations: Television presenter, journalist
- Known for: Coverage of the Turkish invasion of Cyprus

Jan-Olof Bengtsson is a Swedish journalist and political columnist in different media. He was born on 30 April 1952 and lives in Malmö, Sweden and in France.

== Accredited ==
Bengtsson covered the Middle East conflict in Israel and Lebanon during the early eighties as correspondent. He has also been European correspondent and in that capacity covered European Affairs and EU-related material for several years with base in Brussels and Strasbourg. Among other assignments he participated in the Swedish Himalaya-expedition in Nepal in 1981. He is accredited to the International Press Centre by the Danish ministry of foreign affairs and a member of the Swedish Union of Journalists . Until 2011 he worked as political columnist of the Swedish daily Kvällsposten, Malmö, Sweden. Now he is a frequent contributor in other different media as political columnist including the capacity as moderator in debates, mediastrategist and writer.

== Featured articles ==
Bengtsson has produced many featured articles, but is best known for his coverage of Turkey's invasion of Cyprus and his coining of "ghost town" to describe Famagusta in 1974.

In Sweden's newspaper, iDAG, Bengtsson wrote a series of three articles in March 1990 about UN Commissioner for Namibia, Bernt Carlsson, who died when Pan Am Flight 103 was sabotaged over Lockerbie, Scotland on 21 December 1988.

The articles alleged Carlsson had been persuaded by apartheid South Africa into joining PA 103 at the last minute at Heathrow, instead of taking a flight, as intended, direct from Brussels to New York. These articles subsequently formed the basis of one of the conspiracy theories surrounding Pan Am Flight 103.
