= Bengt Nölting =

Bengt Nölting (1 May 1962 – 16 September 2009) was a German physicist and biophysicist who pioneered various methods in biophysics and engineering. Achievements include studying biological macromolecules, the development of self-evolving computer programs, and the development new energy technologies. From 1994 to 1997 Nölting was scientist at Cambridge University and the Cambridge Centre for Protein Engineering (UK) where he developed, together with Sir Alan R. Fersht, methods for the high resolution of protein folding.

== Works ==
- Nölting, Bengt (1999). Protein folding kinetics. Berlin New York: Springer. ISBN 978-3-540-65743-9. OCLC 40964710.
- Nölting, Bengt (2006). Methods in modern biophysics. Berlin New York: Springer. ISBN 3-540-27703-X. OCLC 262692474.
- "Patente – Registerauskunft". DPMAregister (in German).
