= Johannes Swedborg =

Swedish linguist and newspaper publisher (1824–1888)

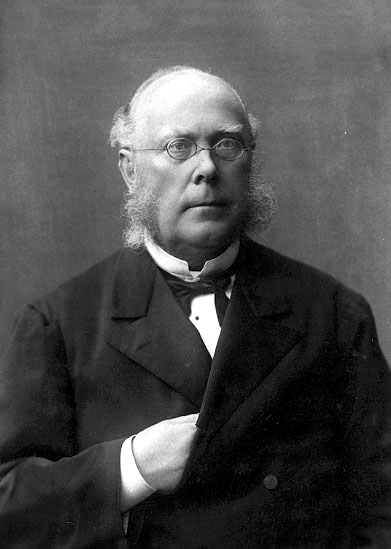
Johannes Swedborg

Johannes Swedborg (5 July 1824 – 16 June 1888) was a Swedish classical languages scholar and newspaper publisher.

== Biography ==
Swedborg grew up in a poor home in Skara in Västra Götaland County, Sweden, where he attended the Skara skola. The studies he financed by working as a private teacher in his spare time. At the age of 23 in 1847, he entered Uppsala University where he earned a bachelor's degree in 1856 and received his master's degree in 1857 following his dissertation De diis Romanorum penatibus. Three years later he presented second dissertation De Claudii Claudiani quod de raptu Proserpinae inscribitur carmine epico quaestiones and was appointed associate professor of Latin at Uppsala University.

He left Uppsala in 1862 and moved to Vänersborg. He had received a position as a lecturer in Latin, Greek, history and geography at the city's higher education and would remain in this position for the remainder of his professional life. In 1866, he became a newspaper publisher in Vänersborg when he launched the newspaper Wenersborgs-Posten of which he was also the editor-in-chief. The paper was published twice weekly until 1872.

== Personal life ==
Swedborg was married to Sofia Amalia Ramstedt (1836–1919) with whom he had sons Anders (1863–1889), Herman Swedborg (1865–1926) and Ernst (1867–1934). He died during 1888 in Vänersborg.
