= Bengt Schalin =

Finnish garden architect (1889–1982)

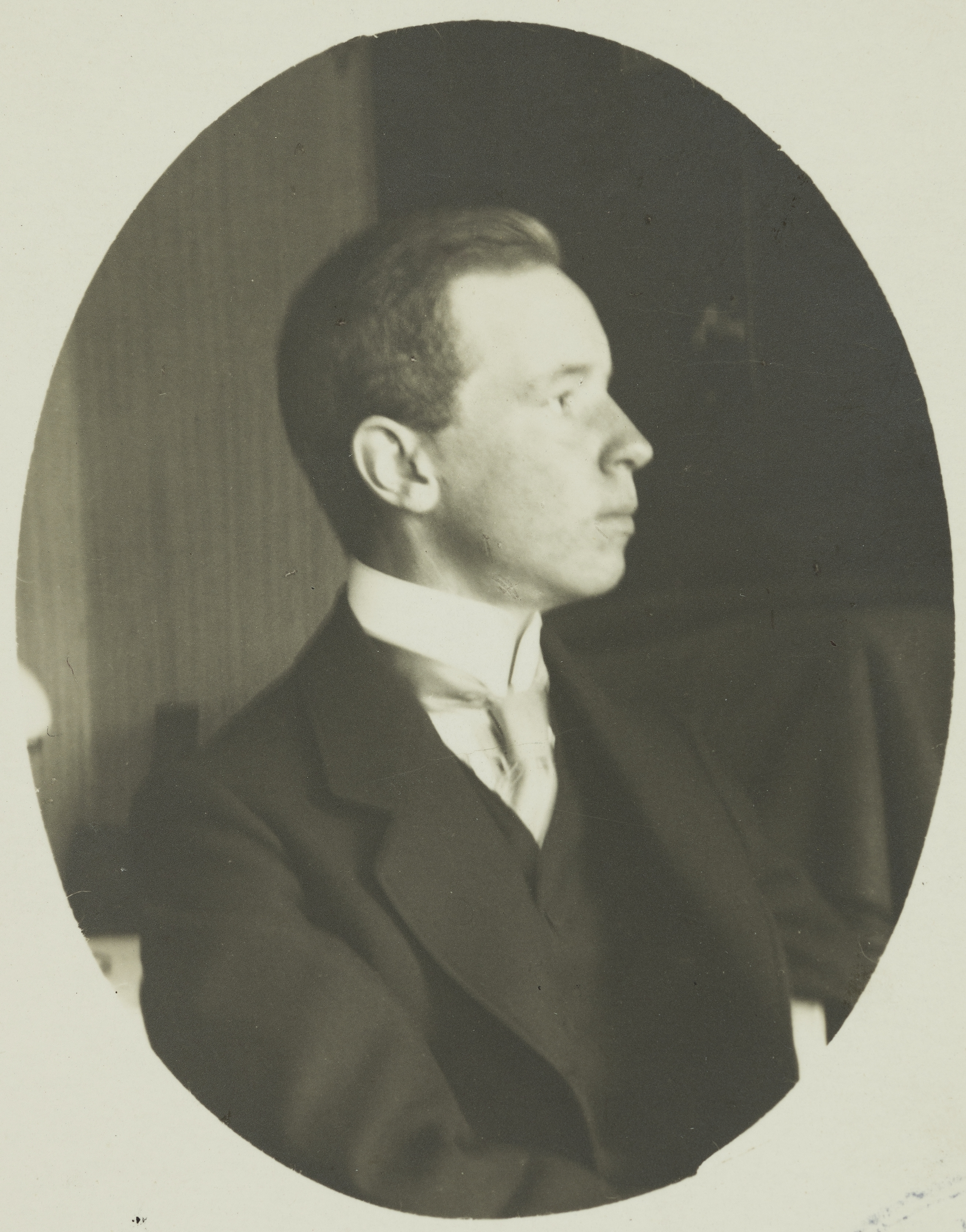
- Born: Bengt Michael Schalin; 7 January 1889; Nykarleby, Finland
- Died: 9 November 1982 (aged 93); Espoo, Finland
- Occupation: Garden architect

Bengt Michael Schalin (7 January 1889 – 9 November 1982) was a well-known garden architect and botanist in Finland during the 20th century.

== Life ==
Schalin obtained his secondary school diploma in 1907 in Turku and went on to study horticulture in Belgium and Germany, where he obtained a degree in gardening in 1912 from the Köstritz Higher School of Horticulture. He ran his own garden design office in Helsinki from 1916 until 1922. From 1922 until 1944, he had his own garden and nursery in Kirkkonummi in Finland.

He was employed as the city gardener in Helsinki from 1946 until his retirement in 1957. He was considered one of Finland's leading experts in the field of garden archicture, with a speciality in perennial plants and decorative bushes. He was also a pioneering plant breeder who grew new hybrid lilies, rhododendrons, crab apple trees, roses and viburnums for the gardens in Helsinki.

He designed a large number of private and public gardens, including the botanical garden in Jakobstad and the park at Vanögård (Vanajanlinna).
