= Vintergatan =

Swedish science fiction comedy series

Vintergatan (literally "Winter Street", the Swedish name of the Milky Way) was a Swedish science fiction comedy TV series directed and written by Petter Bragée and broadcast in 2000, 2001, 2003, and 2010 by Sveriges Television.

== Vintergatan 5a ==
Vintergatan 5a was broadcast as Sommarlovsmorgon Monday–Friday 13 June–11 August 2000.

=== Plot ===
Mira is forced by her father to go to Älguddens sommarkollo ("Älgudden Summer Camp"). She travels there by taxi with two schoolmates, Henrik and Glen. On the way, the taxi has an engine breakdown and the three friends stay in the forest while Peo, the taxi driver, angrily tries to repair the car. Suddenly, they see a bright light and later they are beamed up to a spaceship where they meet a figure called Alien who shows them how to control the spaceship and gives them several missions to collect Raunkiær plant life-forms from planets.

They travel through black holes to complete Alien's missions, and encounter various dangers on the spaceship and on the planets they visit. Five planets are visited:

- 1.Ökenplaneten Zoltzy ("The Desert Planet Zoltzy"), where they search for a special moss and come close to becoming stranded forever.
- 2.Skogsplaneten Filione ("The Forest Planet Filione"), where they must find a special type of beetle and where a stowaway, Femman, gets on board.
- 3.Grottplaneten Zeryj ("The Cave Planet Zeryj"), where they find a special type of fish and are attacked by Grottmonstret ("the Cave Monster").
- 4.Havsplaneten Zinij ("The Sea Planet Zinij"), where they must get a pod from a carnivorous plant but end up being attacked by one that shoots Glen with a dart, rendering him comatose for five days.
- 5.Domedagsplaneten Krasnyj ("Apocalypse Planet Krasnyj"), where their task is to find a cylinder containing the entire history of the planet and are attacked by mutants. One mutant is beamed up to the spaceship and travels back home to Earth with them.

Because they work well together, they manage to complete all missions and return to Earth. Alien, before disappearing into space, tells them that the reason for the missions was att ge vår planet och mänskligheten en ny chans att överleva ("to give our planet and humanity a new chance to survive").

While the series was being broadcast, viewers could call and offer help to the characters. For example, one viewer told them that nedstrålningsplatsen var vid den brutna antennen som Peo kastade ("the down-beaming location was at the broken antenna which Peo threw") when they needed help on Sandplaneten.

The following summer, Vintergatan 5a was followed up by Vintergatan 5b.

=== Selected cast ===
- Philoméne Grandin as Mira
- Wilson D. Michaels as Glen
- Pelle Hanæus as Henrik
- Anders Linder as Peo and Kapten Zoom
- Thomas Hellberg as Alien (voice)
- Jonas Sykfont as Femman
- Per-Axel Gjöres as Taxi chief
- Christina Göransson as Ulla, Peo's wife

== Vintergatan 5b ==
Vintergatan 5b was broadcast as Sommarlovsmorgon Monday–Friday 11 June–10 August 2001. It was a follow-up to Vintergatan 5a, the previous year's Sommarlovsmorgon show. As in that programme, viewers were invited to participate by calling in, for example when the characters needed help.

=== Plot ===
Peo's wife, Ulla, has disappeared and he asks Mira, Glen, and Henrik to accompany him into space to try to find her. When they visit Lavaplaneten ("The Lava Planet"), Mira also disappears. In the series they also meet new characters, among them Irina Teresjkova (who had been beamed up in 1963 from Sputnik 1), Benke Bengtsson, and Gaia and Garsson, who work at a rymdmack ("space filling station"). They find some material which may help them and end up realizing that Mira, together with Sjuan (Femman's younger sister, played by Bodil Ekelund), have been kidnapped by "figures with hats with lamps" called fifuner (fifun in the singular) on their planet Karichnivi. Ulla is not there, however, having instead been frozen and kept in a refrigerator in the spaceship's machine room the whole summer. Femman finds her but only reveals that fact to the others until the end of the adventure because Ingen frågade ("no one asked").

The new characters are played by Jonas Sykfont (Femman/Benke Bengtsson/Garsson), Ingela Schale (Irina), and Inga Sarri (Gaia).

Gaia turns out to be simply the title of whoever operates the space filling station. When Gaia and Garsson quit, Peo and Ulla take over the station and become the new Gaior (plural of Gaia).

In this series, the characters again travel through black holes to complete their missions. They are met with dangers on the space ship as they visit each planet. The planets visited are:

1. Lavaplaneten Tjårnyj ("The Lava Planet Tjornyj"), where they meet the pilgrim Melvis and find out that Mira has been kidnapped.
2. Skogsplaneten Filione ("The Forest Planet Filione"), where they get to know the kidnappers, who are called Fifuner.
3. Sandplaneten Bely ("The Sand Planet Bely"), where they find out the "Fun-lab" is being moved to another planet. They also meet Kubrik who lives in a tent.
4. Poolplaneten ("The Pool Planet"), where they get a map and coordinates for the lab where their friends are being trapped. They also meet Kubrik's brother, Rubrik, who also lives in a tent with his giant crab Krackén.
5. Labbplaneten Karichnivi ("The Lab Planet Karichnivi"), where they release all those who have been kidnapped and put in cages, including Mira and Sjuan.

=== Factual mistake ===
In the 4th episode, Henrik states that Yuri Gagarin dog i en flygolycka för 37 år sen ("Yuri Gagarin died in an airplane accident 37 years ago"). However, in 2001, when the series aired, only 33 years had passed from Gagarin's death in 1968.

== Tillbaka till Vintergatan ==
Tillbaka till Vintergatan (Back to the Milky Way) was aired in 2003, but has been rebroadcast several times. It is a recut version of Vintergatan 5a and 5b, combined with new material. Peo is now the Gaia at the space filling station and tells Garsson, who visits him, about the adventures of the summers of 2000 and 2001.

== Vid Vintergatans slut ==
Vid Vintergatans slut (At the end of the Milky Way) followed Vintergatan 5a and 5b and was first broadcast on 30 January 2010, then on Saturdays. It was produced, by Anagram Produktion, during the spring of 2009.

=== Plot ===
Vid Vintergatans slut takes place almost 20 years after Vintergatan 5a and 5b. Mira (Philoméne Grandin) has now become mother to the 13-year-old girl Billie (Fanny Ketter) and they have created a good life for themselves on Earth. Peo's (Anders Linder) and Ulla's (Christina Göransson) time as "Gaior" is soon ended, and the calm at Milky Way ("Vintergatan") comes to an end. Every space figure is threatened. Ulla disappears again, and the worried Peo sends the cargo ship's pilot Pax (Sanna Persson Halapi) to Earth to fetch Mira, who he thinks can help him. Instead, Pax by mistake picks up Billie, Mira's daughter. Around the time when Pax returns to the space station, Peo has narrowly escaped being murdered by the "fun" Captain Storm (Per-Axel Gjöres) who works for the "Triumvirate" of Professor (Eva Westerling), Lennartsson (André Wickström), and Greven (Anders Jansson). A storm destroys the space station, but Peo saves himself at the last minute in an emergency capsule.

The characters visit two planets and an asteroid:

- 1.Bergsplaneten Ürgüp ("The Mountain Planet Ürgüp"), where they meet "ürgüpper" (in English "ürgüps") and find the Count's Palace. Mira once again gets kidnapped by the "Fifuner".
- 2.Skogsplaneten Filione ("The Forest Planet Filione"), where they get help from Kapten Zoom and Femman.
- 3.Svarta Asteroiden ("The Black Asteroid"), where they paralyze the "Triumvirate" and release Mira and Ulla from the cages.

=== Selected cast ===
- Fanny Ketter as Billie
- Philomène Grandin as Mira
- Sanna Persson Halapi as Pax
- Anders Jansson as Greven
- Eva Westerling as Professor
- André Wickström as Lennartsson
- Per-Axel Gjöres as Storm
- Alexander Karim as Crona
- Johan Wester as Billie's teacher
