= Bengt Nilsson (actor) =

Swedish actor (born 1967)

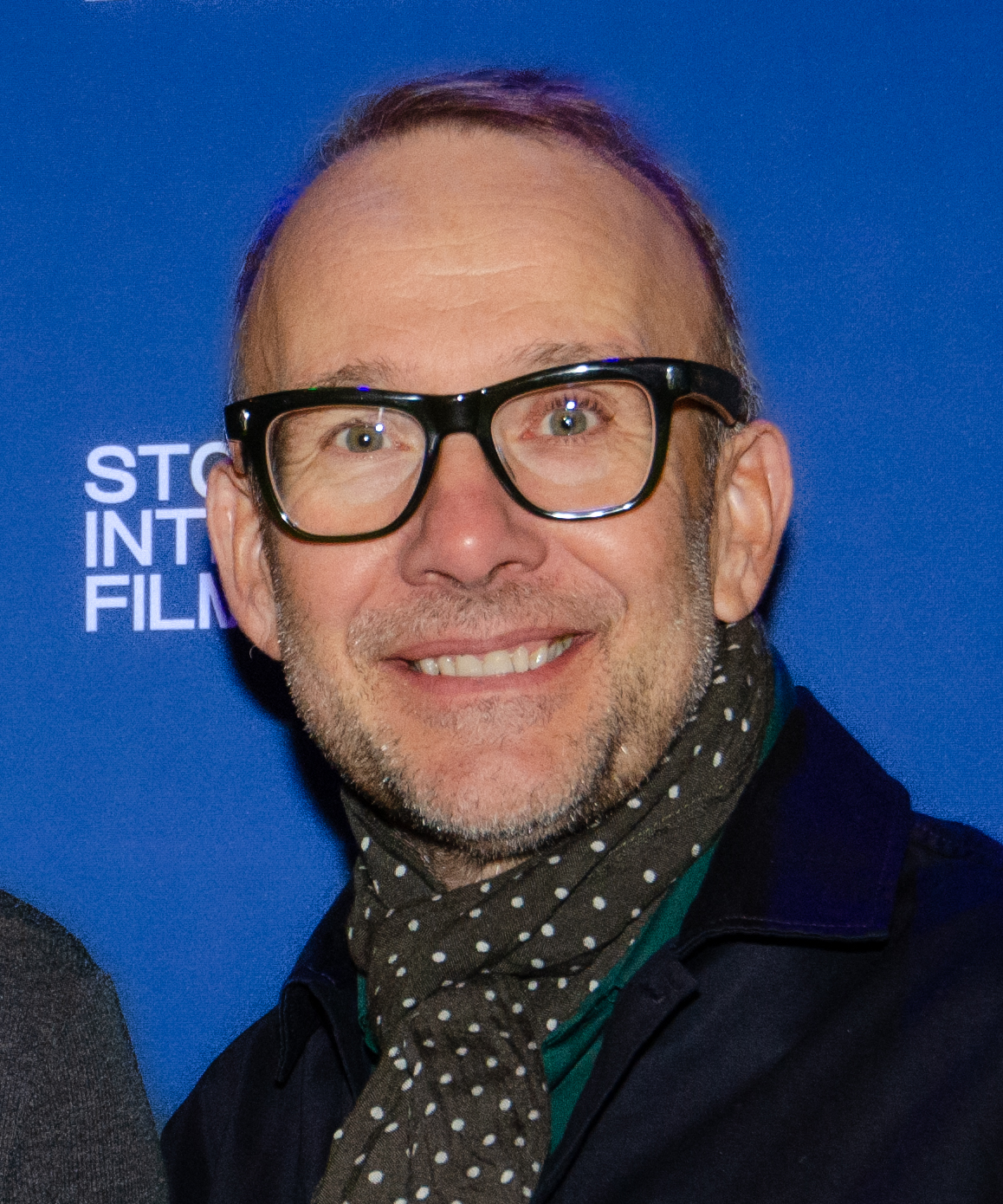
Bengt Nilsson

Bengt Roger Nilsson he is now known as Bengt Åke Braskered (born 15 March 1967 in Vittangi, Kiruna Municipality, Sweden) is a Swedish actor.

== Filmography ==
Year	Title	Role	Notes
1993	Polis polis potatismos		
1998	Kärlek och alltihopa		
1998	Beck – The Money Man	Leonard	
1998	Skilda världar		
2000	Det blir aldrig som man tänkt sig		
2002	Familjen		
2003	Norrmalmstorg		
2004	Pappa Jansson		
2004	Här ligger jag		
2006	Varannan vecka		
2006	Lite som du		
2010	Sound of Noise	Amadeus Warnebring	

== As a writer ==
He wrote the miniseries En Kunglig Affär or A Royal Secret for Sveriges Television which covers the events surrounding the Haijby affair, Gustaf V with Kurt Haijby a con-man.
