= Johan Bengtsson =

Swedish musician

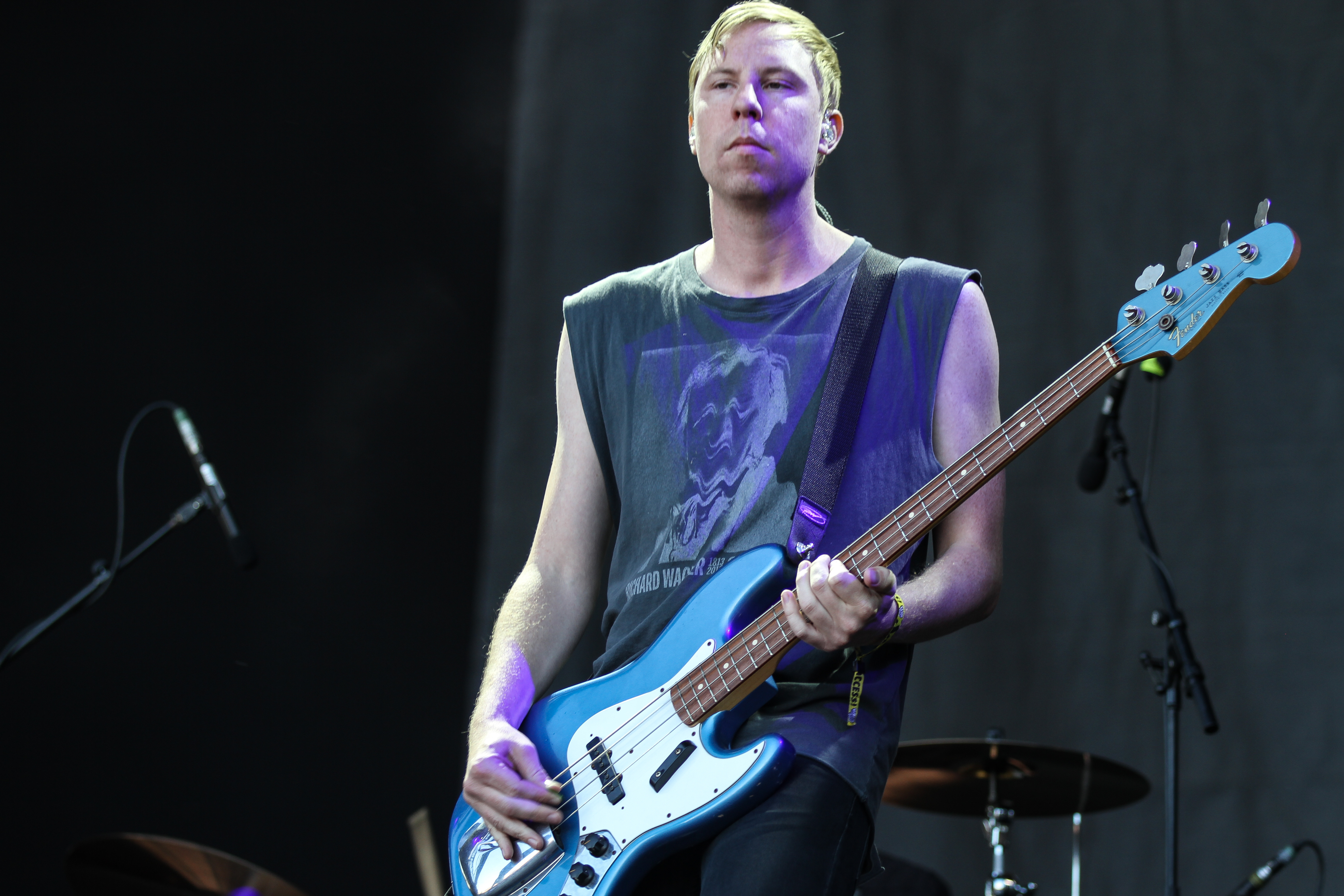
- Johan Bengtsson

Background information
- Born: 3 May 1979 (age 46); Helsingborg, Sweden
- Occupation: bassist
- Member of: The Sounds

Johan Bengtsson (born 3 May 1979 in Helsingborg, Sweden) is the bassist for The Sounds. He has also collaborated with DJ Tommie Sunshine on the song "Dance Among the Ruins".
