= Anders Linder =

Swedish actor and jazz musician (born 1941)

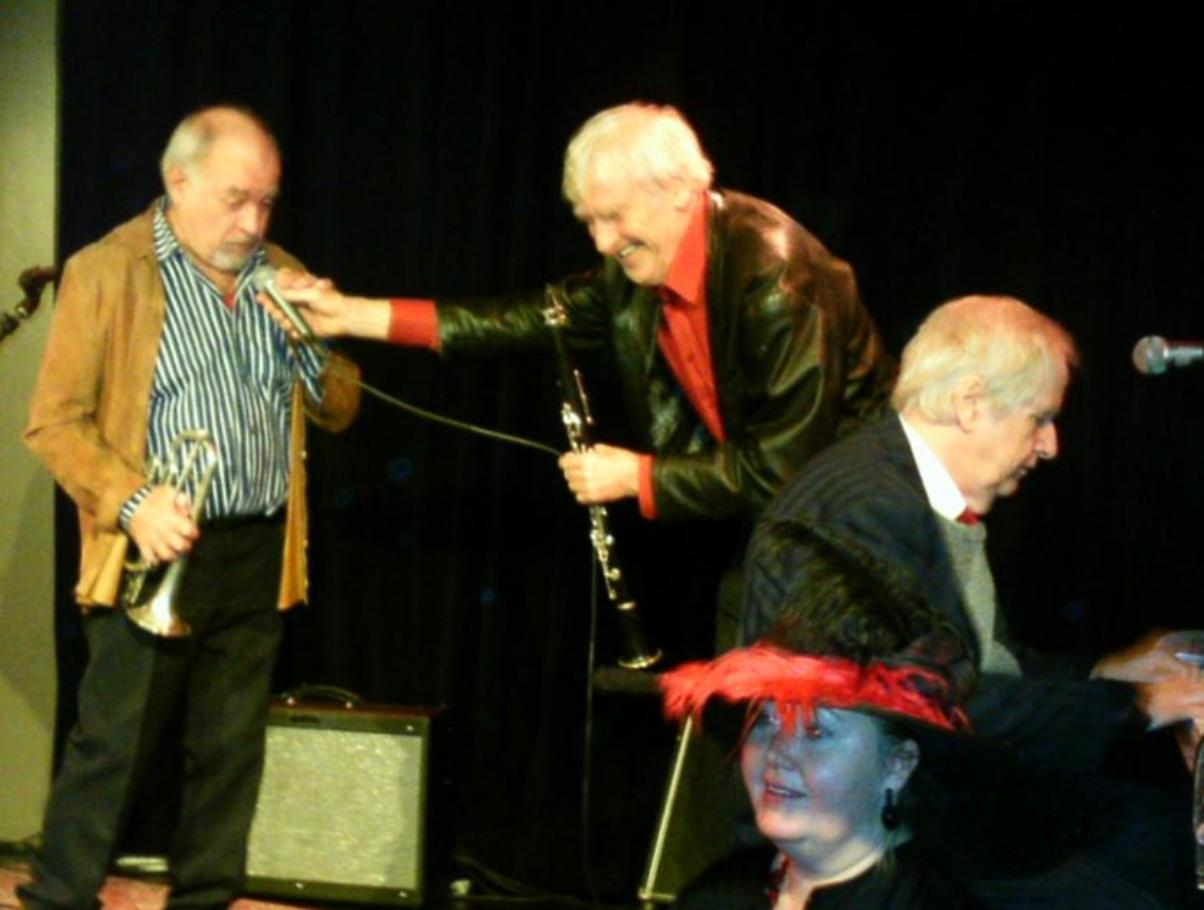
Anders Linder (center) and Carl-Axel Dominique (right) jam at the Kim Anderzon funeral reception

Anders Hjalmar Linder (born 27 August 1941 in Solna, Sweden) is a Swedish actor and jazz musician. His father is Erik Hjalmar Linder and his son is Olle Linder. He is mainly known from the children's programs Ville, Valle och Viktor, Vintergatan, Björnes magasin and Kapten Zoom.

Linder is a trained architect from the Royal Institute of Technology in Stockholm, but only worked half-time as an architect for two years before his stage career took over entirely.
