= Bengt Oxenstierna =

Bengt Oxenstierna may refer to:

- Bengt Bengtsson Oxenstierna (1591–1643), Swedish Privy Councillor and diplomat, Governor-General of Ingria and Livonia
- Bengt Gabrielsson Oxenstierna (1623–1702), President of the Royal Swedish Chancellery
