= Bengt Jönsson =

Bengt Jönsson may refer to:

- Bengt Jönsson (athletics coach) (born 1958), Swedish trainer in athletics
- Bengt Jönsson (Oxenstierna), Swedish statesman and co-regent of Sweden
- Bengt Jönsson (swimmer) (born 1955), Swedish swimmer
