= Bengt Fredman =

Swedish Army officer (1916–2008)

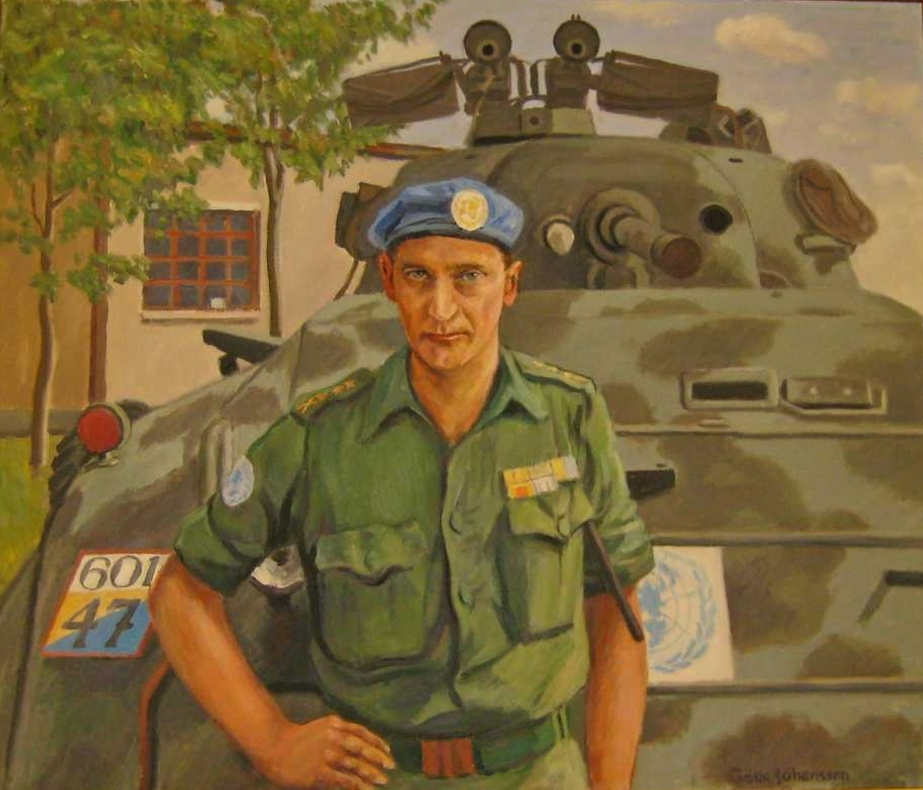
- Portrait painting of Bengt Fredman.
- Born: Bengt Gösta Olof Fredman; 22 April 1916; Östersund, Sweden
- Died: 31 December 2008 (aged 92)
- Military career
- Allegiance: Sweden
- Branch: Swedish Army
- Service years: 1939–1970s
- Rank: Lieutenant colonel
- Units: Västernorrland Regiment; ONUC; Jämtland Ranger Regiment
- Conflicts: Congo Crisis; Operation Grandslam

Lieutenant Colonel Bengt Gösta Olof Fredman (22 April 1916 – 31 December 2008) was a Swedish Army officer, mostly known for his actions during the Congo Crisis in 1963.

== Early life ==
Fredman was born on 22 April 1916 in Östersund, Sweden, the son of Reinhold Fredman, an accountant, and his wife Astrid Dahlström. He passed studentexamen in Sundsvall in 1935.

== Career ==
Fredman was commissioned as an officer in 1939 and was assigned as a second lieutenant to Västernorrland Regiment (I 21) in Sollefteå Fredman was promoted to lieutenant two years later and attended the Royal Swedish Army Staff College becoming captain in 1947. He served as secretary in the Västernorrland County's officer training union from 1948 to 1959 and was a member of the Central Federation for Voluntary Military Training (Centralförbundet för befälsutbildning) from 1956. Fredman served as major in the staff of Härnösand Defence District in 1958.

=== Congo ===
Fredman was commanding officer of the Swedish Battalion XVIII K between October 1962 and May 1963. He was handpicked for the post of deputy battalion commander but as the regular battalion commander was asked to become head of sector Kamina in the State of Katanga, Fredman received direct command and responsibility of the battalion. Thus, it was he who with short notice, planned, led the attack and captured the town of Kaminaville during Operation Grandslam on New Year's Eve in 1962. The attack occurred without loss to the Swedes and without destruction of either the white or African district. The larger of the two captured Gendarmerie camps in Kaminaville was named by a soldier very frivolously to Camp Fred which also became the future name. The name (Fred, Swedish word for "Peace") partly referred to their mission as peacemakers and the UN peacekeeping mandate and partly as a tribute to their battalion commander Bengt Fredman.

Early in the morning of 12 January 1963 in Kabundji, Fredman and his battalion surprised two Gendarmerie battalions on their payday and were disarmed, demobilized, were paid with their own war chest, declared to be civilians and sent home to their respective hometowns.

=== Later career ===
Back in Sweden in 1963, Fredman began serving in the Jämtland Ranger Regiment (I 5) and in 1966 he was promoted to lieutenant colonel and appointed head of the staff department and adjutant to the military commander of the Eastern Military District (Milo Ö) in Strängnäs.

Fredman was a member of the Swedish Order of Freemasons and Samfundet SHT.

== Personal life ==
In 1941, Fredman married Gun Wennberg (1920–1999), the daughter of Bror Wennberg and Beda Östling. He was the father of Lars Olof (born 1945), Elisabeth (born 1950), and Lennart (born 1953).

== Death ==
Fredman died on 31 December 2008 and was buried at the Eastern Cemetery in his hometown of Östersund.

== Dates of rank ==
- 1939 – Second lieutenant
- 1941 – Lieutenant
- 1947 – Captain
- 1958 – Major
- 1962 – Lieutenant colonel (acting rank)
- 1966 – Lieutenant colonel

== Awards and decorations ==
=== Swedish ===
- (Sweden) Knight of the Order of the Sword (1959)
- (Sweden) Swedish Central Federation for Voluntary Military Training Medal of Merit in silver
- (Sweden) Swedish Women's Voluntary Defence Organization Royal Medal of Merit in silver
- (Sweden) Swedish Civil Protection Association Merit Badge in gold
- (Sweden) Västernorrland County Association for Volunteer Military Training's Gold Medal (Västernorrlands läns befäls(utbildnings)förbunds guldmedalj)
- (Sweden) National Federation of Swedish Women's Auxiliary Defence Services' Silver Medal (Riksförbundet Sveriges lottakårers silvermedalj)
- (Sweden) Västernorrland Rifle Association's Silver Medal (Västernorrlands skytteförbunds silvermedalj)
- (Sweden) Society for the Promotion of Ski Sport and Open Air Life's Gold Medal (Skid- och friluftsfrämjandets i Sveriges guldmedalj)

=== Foreign ===
- United Nations Medal (ONUC)
