= Bengtolle Oldinger =

Swedish painter (1911–1988)

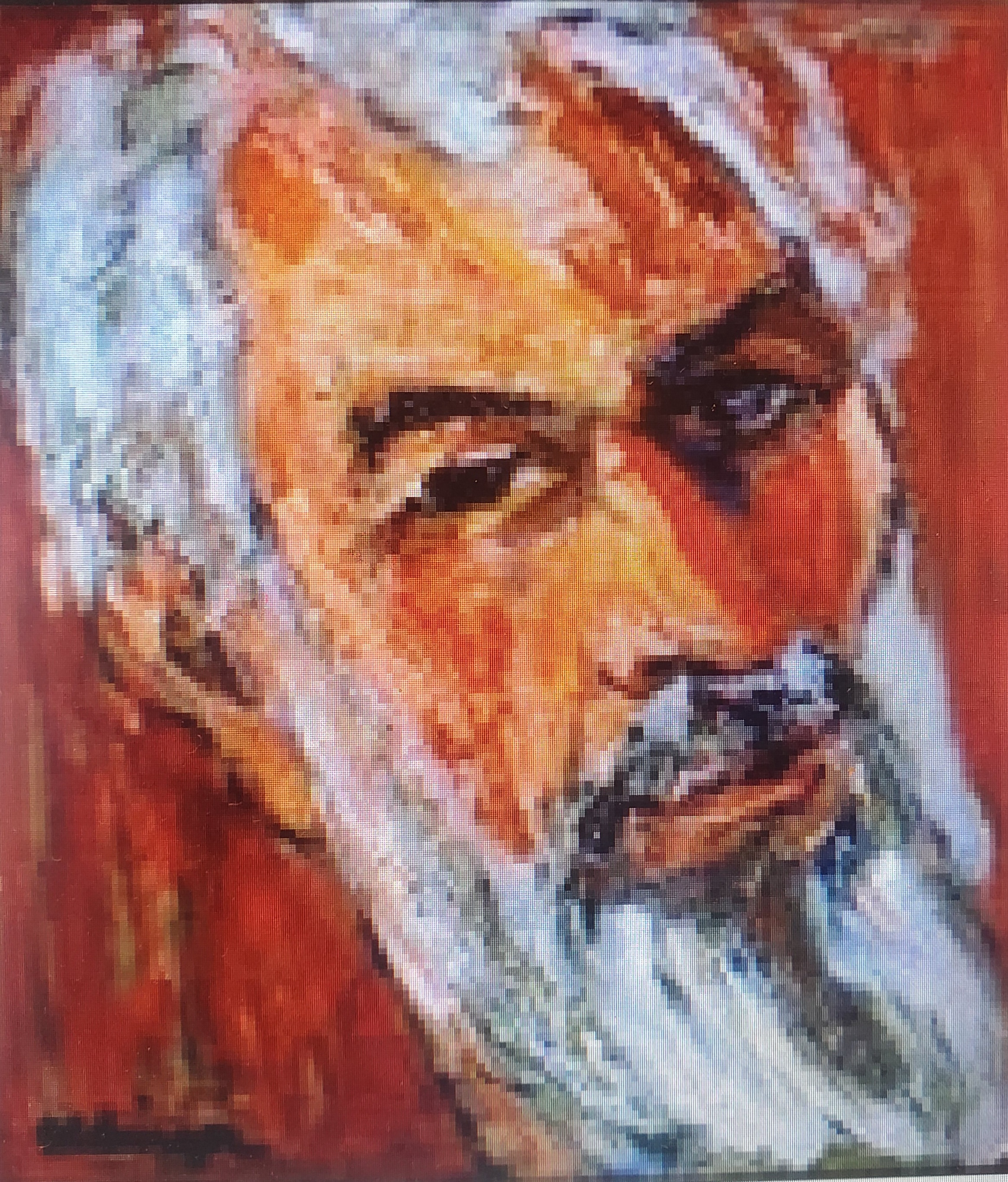
- Self portrait, 1978
- Born: Bengt Anders Valter Oldinger; November 3, 1911; Åmål, Dalsland, Sweden
- Died: March 31, 1988 (aged 76); Stockholm, Sweden
- Burial place: Skogskyrkogården, Stockholm, Sweden
- Occupations: Painter, draftsman, teacher

Bengt Anders Valter (Bengtolle) Oldinger (November 3, 1911, in Åmål – March 31, 1988, in Stockholm) was a Swedish painter, teacher, and draftsman.

== Early life ==
After training as an elementary school teacher at the Folkskoleseminariet in Karlstad and as an opera singer, he studied painting with Otte Sköld in Stockholm in 1937, and with André Lhote in Paris in 1947 and 1951. He was a teacher in Mälarhöjden's school until 1949.

== Career ==
Primarily, Oldinger painted in oil and acrylic, and was a draftsman who captured people in motion with a few lines. In reviews, his strong coloring, safe brushwork, and ability to compose images are emphasized. His motifs were discovered on painting trips in some sixty countries. He was particularly stimulated by encounters with folk life and nature in Egypt, Mexico, and Japan, and he gladly returned to the autumn colors of the mountain world and to life on the square during summers in Åmål.

In 1966 he was awarded a diploma at the Grand Prix International d'art contemporain de la Principauté de Monaco.

=== Exhibitions ===
In 1943 and 1950, solo exhibitions were held in Stockholm. Oldinger participated in group exhibitions in Spain in 1953 and 1954. Oldinger had a solo exhibition in 1958 at the Art Academy in Stockholm. After his first exhibition at Galleri Paul Ambroise in Paris in 1959, he changed his signature from Bengtolle to Oldinger. He participated in collective exhibitions in Paris in 1960 and 1967. In 1964 he was represented at the Art Suèdois contemporain exhibition in the Musée Galerie in Paris

He held a solo exhibition in 1967 at Gallery Paul Ambroise in Paris. In 1968, Åmål's art gallery was inaugurated with Oldinger's solo exhibition and he had exhibitions at Galleri AE in Gothenburg and Galleri St Erik in Stockholm. In connection with his 70th birthday in 1981, a retrospective exhibition was held in Åmål's art gallery.

In 2011, in connection with the 100th anniversary of his birth, exhibitions were held at Galleri Sander in Norrköping and at Galleri Kottla in Lidingö.

== Collections ==
Oldinger is, among other things, represented in King Gustav VI Adolf's collections at the National Museum in Stockholm, the Tessin institute in Paris, the Norrköping Art Museum and the Härjedalen Museum.

== Personal life ==
Oldinger is buried at Skogskyrkogården in Stockholm.
