= Lars Peterson =

Swedish orthopedist

Lars Peterson (born 1936 in Vansbro, Sweden) is an orthopedist, known as "the father of autologous cell implantation".

Beginning in 1987, Peterson co-pioneered, with colleague Mats Brittberg and others, autologous chondrocyte implantation, a method of repairing cartilage using a patient's own cartilage cells. He was honored for his work at Genzyme in 2009.

He is also a professor and sports physician, and has been a Swedish national league football and ice hockey player, active in both Örgryte IS and Frölunda HC.

Peterson's sports career started early in most sports, ending up playing in the Swedish National League in both soccer and hockey with Örgryte IS, ending on fourth place and Västra Frölunda IF, ending first place, respectively. Along with playing soccer and football, he studied medicine at the University of Gothenburg and graduated in 1966. He served his Residency in General Surgery in Kungälvs Hospital, his orthopaedic residency in Sahlgrenska University Hospital from 1967 to 1974, and became specialist in General Surgery 1972 and in Orthopaedic Surgery 1974. In 1974, Peterson defended his doctoral thesis: Fracture of the Neck of the Talus, An Experimental and Clinical Study.

In 1980, Peterson was approved associate professor of Orthopaedic Surgery at the University of Gothenburg and in 2000, appointed professor of Orthopaedic Surgery. Peterson had a long and broad experience in treating athletes in his University practice and as team physician in soccer and ice hockey and since 1987 in his clinic, Gothenburg Medical Center. He has served as head physician of the Swedish National Team in ice hockey and in soccer

For over 25 years, Peterson has been a member of the Sports Medical Committee of FIFA, The International Football Federation and a founding member of F-Marc (FIFA Medical Assessment and Research Center). He has served as a Medical Officer at six World Cups in Football. Peterson has been President of the Swedish Society of Sports Medicine and is an honorary member. He was president and one of the founding members of the International Society of Cartilage Repair (ICRS). He has served as Godfather for ICRS Traveling Fellows in 2001. He also has served as Goodfather in the Herodicus Society.

In 2010, Peterson received “The Duke of Edinburgh Prize“ for “Outstanding contribution to international education in Sports Medicine”. In 2010 awarded “Doctor Honoris Causa” at the University of Helsinki, Finland. In 2011, he was awarded “Doctor Honoris Causa” at Universidad Católica San Antonio de Murcia, Spain.

Peterson has lectured extensively, nationally and internationally and served as visiting professor several times. His publication list includes more than 200 originals, reviews books, book chapters in the fields of Orthopaedic Surgery, Sports Traumatology and Sports Medicine, Biomechanics, and Rehabilitation.
