= Bengt Gustafsson =

Bengt Gustafsson may refer to:

- Bengt Gustafsson (astronomer) (born 1943), Swedish professor of astronomy
- Bengt-Åke Gustafsson (born 1958), Swedish ice hockey player and coach
- Bengt Gustafsson (general) (1933–2019), Supreme Commander of the Swedish Armed Forces 1986–1994

== See also ==
- Bengt Gustafson (born 1963), Sweden volleyball player
