= Bengt Andersson Qvist =

Swedish chemist and mineralogist

- Born: 21 October 1726
- Died: 20 December 1792 (aged 63); Stockholm, Sweden
- Known for: improvement of steel making in Sweden

Bengt Andersson Qvist (sometimes Benct Qvist or Bengt Quist (21 October 1726 – 14 October 1799) was a Swedish chemist and mineralogist. He was assistant of Sven Rinman and after a visit to steel plants in Britain he built a demonstration plant in Sweden.

In 1769, he was elected a member of the Royal Swedish Academy of Sciences.
