= Bankson =

Bankson is a given name and surname. Notable people with the name include:

- Bankson T. Holcomb Jr. (1908–2000), American general in the United States Marine Corps
- Cassandra Bankson (born 1992), American media personality and model
- Claudia Bankson, fictional character in American Horror Story: Hotel
- Doug Bankson (born 1963), American politician

== See also ==
- Bankson Lake, in Michigan
