= Sommarlovsmorgon =

Swedish children's television series

- Genre: children
- Country of origin: Sweden
- Original language: Swedish

Original release
- Network: SVT
- Release: 1978

Sommarlovsmorgon (Summer vacation Morning) is a TV-series for children, broadcast by Sveriges Television every morning during the Swedish summer holidays, before 2011 only Monday–Friday. Since 2007 it has been possible to watch the program in the evening when it is repeated. During the Swedish Christmas holidays a TV series called Jullovsmorgon was broadcast, from the Christmas of 1970/71 to 2008/09. Every year's "Sommarlovsmorgon" broadcasts TV series/films.

== Series ==
According to Swedish Media Database.

- 1978–1987 – Sommarmorgon
- 1988–1989 – Sommarlov
- 1990 – Sommarlov with Gila Bergqvist, Ellinor Persson and Jan Trolin
- 1991 – Sommarlov with Gila Bergqvist, Peter Settman and Fredrik Granberg
- 1992 – Volrammos
- 1993–1994 – Tippen with Lasse Beischer and Morgan Alling
- 1995 – Sommarlov with Sara and Erik Haag
- 1996 – Kloak
- 1997 – Salve
- 1998 – Alarm
- 1999 – Mormors magiska vind
- 2000–2001 – Vintergatan
- 2002 – Högaffla Hage
- 2003–2004 – Badeboda Bo/Sommarkåken
- 2005 – Sommarlov 05
- 2006–2008 – Hej hej sommar
- 2009 – Sommarlov 09
- 2010–present (2020) – Sommarlov

== See also ==
- Sveriges Radio's Christmas Calendar
- Sveriges Television's Christmas calendar
