= List of Swedish actors =

This is a list of Swedish actors:

== A, Å, Ä ==
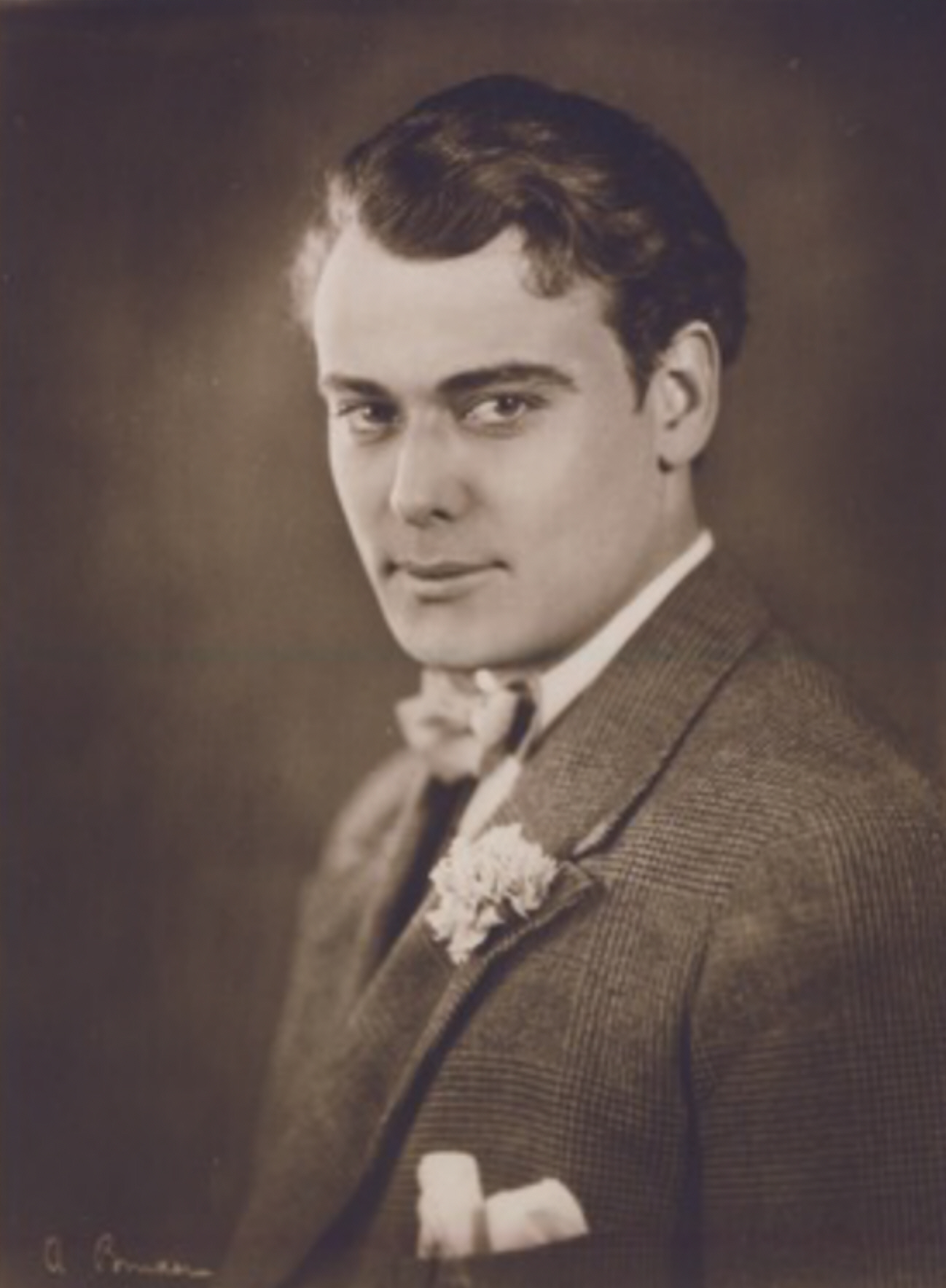
Nils Asther

- Anders Åberg (1948–2020)
- Lasse Åberg (born 1940)
- Eric Abrahamsson (1890–1942)
- Gunilla Abrahamsson (born 1945)
- Maud Adams (born 1945)
- Ann-Mari Adamsson (1934–2011)
- Georg Adelly (1919–1997)
- Edvin Adolphson (1893–1979)
- Kristina Adolphson (born 1937)
- Knut Agnred (born 1956)
- Thecla Åhlander (1855–1925)
- Harry Ahlin (1900–1969)
- Herman Ahlsell (1919–1994)
- Börje Ahlstedt (born 1939)
- Nils Ahrén (1877–1928)
- Elof Ahrle (1900–1965)
- Sven d'Ailly (1892–1969)
- Gösta Alexandersson (1905–1988)
- Margita Alfvén (1905–1962)
- Morgan Alling (born 1968)
- Malin Åkerman (born 1978)
- Ulla Akselson (1924–2007)
- Karin Albihn (1912–1974)
- Elsie Albiin (1921–2009)
- Emmy Albiin (1873–1959)
- Inga Ålenius (1938–2017)
- Hans "Hasse" Alfredson (1931–2017)
- Emil Almén (born 1980)
- Greta Almroth (1888–1981)
- Hanna Alström (born 1981)
- Sara Alström (born 1975)
- Gabriel Alw (1889–1946)
- Lars Amble (1939–2015)
- Marianne Aminoff (1916–1984)
- Bertil Anderberg (1913–1991)
- Torgny Anderberg (1919–2000)
- Augusta Anderson (1875–1951)
- Bibi Andersson (1935–2019)
- Birgitta Andersson (1933–2026)
- Gerd Andersson (born 1932)
- Harriet Andersson (born 1932)
- Jörgen Andersson (born 1951)
- Kent Andersson (1933–2005)
- Morgan Andersson (1934–1977)
- Olga Andersson (1876–1943)
- Peter Andersson (born 1953)
- Tommy Andersson (1962–2013)
- Wiktor Andersson (1887–1966)
- Kim Anderzon (1943–2014)
- Tintin Anderzon (born 1964)
- Leif Andrée (born 1958)
- Björn Andrésen (1955–2025)
- Ann-Margret (born 1941) (naturalized American citizen)
- Brita Appelgren (1912–1999)
- Georg Årlin (1916–1992)
- Birgitta Arman (1921–2007)
- Per-Axel Arosenius (1920–1981)
- Ragnar Arvedson (1895–1973)
- Sven Arvor (1907–2001)
- Olof Ås (1892–1949)
- Birger Åsander (1909–1984)
- Tobias Aspelin (born 1968)
- Josefin Asplund (born 1991)
- Nils Asther (1897–1981)
- Anna Åström (born 1990)
- Ted Åström (born 1945)
- Pernilla August (born 1958)
- Ewa Aulin (born 1950)
- Eddie Axberg (born 1947)
- Einar Axelsson (1895–1971)

== B ==
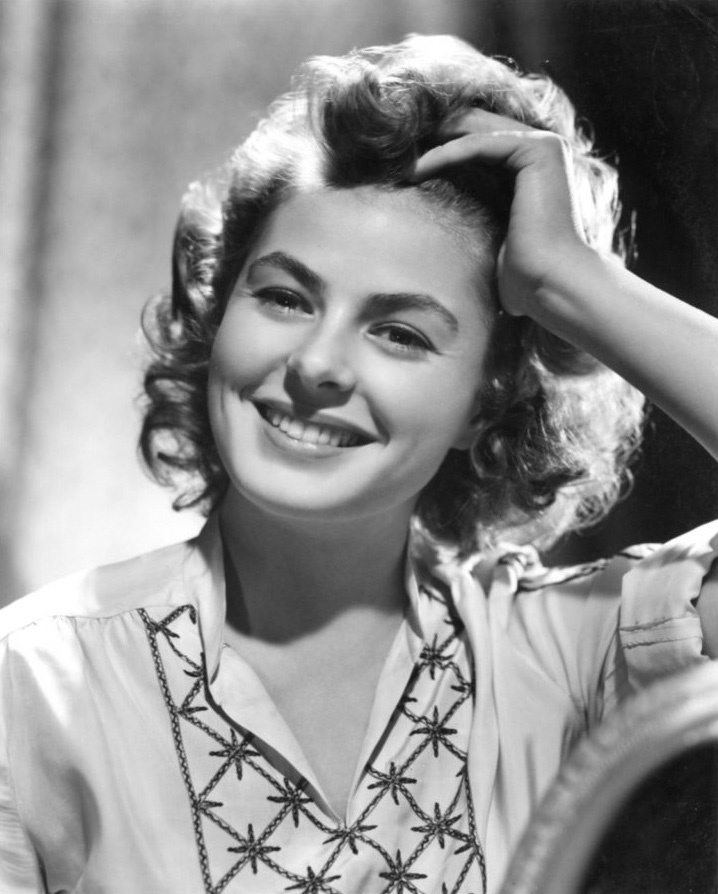
Ingrid Bergman

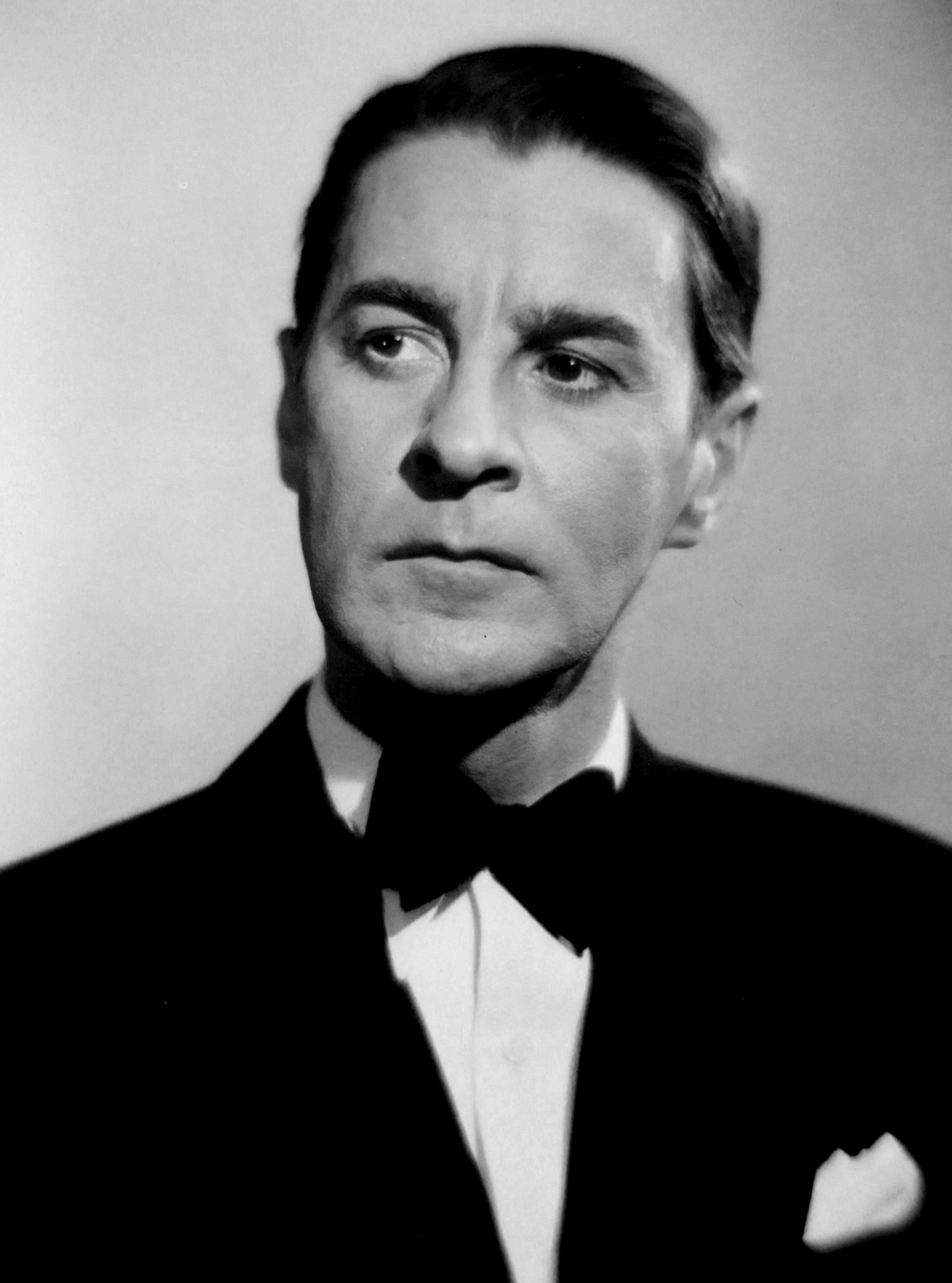
Gunnar Björnstrand

- Inday Ba (1972–2005)
- Alice Babs (1924–2014)
- Ingrid Backlin (1920–2013)
- Zara Backman (1875–1949)
- Johannes Bah Kuhnke (born 1972)
- Jonas Bane (born 1987)
- Carl Barcklind (1873–1945)
- Anna Bartels (1869–1950), opera singer
- Anna-Lisa Baude (1897–1968)
- Josua Bengtson (1882–1958)
- Björn Bengtsson (born 1973)
- Filip Benko (born 1986)
- Benkt-Åke Benktsson (1907–1957)
- Lars-Erik Berenett (1942–2017)
- Matti Berenett (born 1971)
- Filip Berg (born 1986)
- Stina Berg (1869–1930)
- Anna-Lena Bergelin (born 1959)
- Simon J. Berger (born 1979)
- Thommy Berggren (born 1937)
- Malin Berghagen (born 1966)
- Björn Berglund (1904–1968)
- Erik "Bullen" Berglund (1887–1963)
- Anna Bergman (born 1948)
- Ingrid Bergman (1915–1982)
- Mats Bergman (born 1948)
- Patrik Bergner (born 1962)
- Ulla Bergryd (1942–2015)
- Helena Bergström (born 1964)
- Jonas Bergström (born 1946)
- Olof Bergström (1919–1984)
- Torsten Bergström (1896–1948)
- Kjell Bergqvist (born 1953)
- Gösta Bernhard (1910–1986)
- Tord Bernheim (1914–1992)
- Theodor Berthels (1892–1951)
- Karin Bertling (born 1937)
- Källa Bie (born 1974)
- Carl Billquist (1933–1993)
- Fritiof Billquist (1901–1972)
- Malin Birgerson (born 1968)
- Björn Bjelfvenstam (born 1929)
- Åsa Bjerkerot (born 1959)
- Anita Björk (1923–2012)
- Anna Björk (born 1970)
- Halvar Björk (1928–2000)
- Olle Björklund (1916–1981)
- Renée Björling (1898–1975)
- Hugo Björne (1886–1966)
- Gunnar Björnstrand (1909–1986)
- Tehilla Blad (born 1995)
- Anna Blomberg (born 1972)
- Bengt Blomgren (1923–2013)
- Georg Blomstedt (1872–1933)
- Astrid Bodin (1903–1961)
- Allan Bohlin (1907–1959)
- Tomas Bolme (born 1945)
- Iwa Boman (born 1944)
- Sven Hugo Borg (1896–1981)
- Hilda Borgström (1871–1953)
- Josephine Bornebusch (born 1981)
- Jarl Borssén (1937–2012)
- Rolf Botvid (1915–1998)
- Lia Boysen (born 1966)
- Sanna Bråding (born 1980)
- Daniel Bragderyd (born 1991)
- Ida Brander (1857–1931)
- Brasse Brännström (1945–2014)
- Gösta Bredefeldt (1935–2010)
- Simon Brehm (1921–1967)
- Naemi Briese (1908–1980)
- May Britt (1934–2025)
- Helena Brodin (born 1936)
- Helga Brofeldt (1881–1968)
- Lena Brogren (1929–2005)
- Tomas von Brömssen (born 1943)
- Gudrun Brost (1910–1993)
- Johannes Brost (1946–2018)
- Carl Browallius (1868–1944)
- Bo Brundin (1937–2022)
- Ernst Brunman (1886–1961)
- Anne-Marie Brunius (1916–2002)
- Britta Brunius (1912–2000)
- John W. Brunius (1884–1937)
- Pauline Brunius (1881–1954)
- Ulf Brunnberg (born 1947)
- Vilhelm Bryde (1888–1974)
- Petra Brylander (born 1970)
- Reine Brynolfsson (born 1953)
- Bror Bügler (1908–1975)
- MyAnna Buring (born 1979)
- Elsa Burnett (1902–1999)
- Margaretha Byström (born 1937)
- Oscar Byström (1857–1938)

== C ==
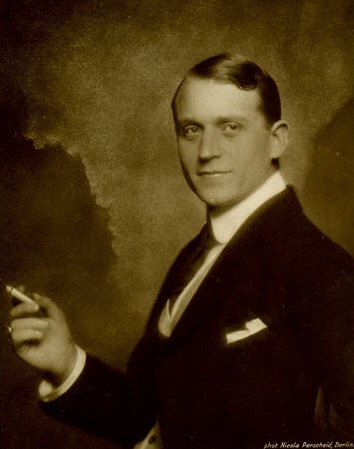
Nils Olaf Chrisander

- Julia Cæsar (1885–1971)
- Peter Carlberg (born 1950)
- Margit Carlqvist (born 1932)
- Elisabet Carlsson (born 1968)
- Elsa Carlsson (1892–1978)
- Ing-Marie Carlsson (born 1957)
- Janne "Loffe" Carlsson (1937–2017)
- Lars Göran Carlsson (born 1936)
- Sickan Carlsson (1915–2011)
- Thord Carlsson (1931–2005)
- Carl Carlswärd (born 1949)
- Artur Cederborgh (1885–1961)
- Jakob Cedergren (born 1973)
- Sten-Åke Cederhök (1913–1990)
- Gösta Cederlund (1888–1980)
- Åke Claesson (1889–1967)
- Krister Classon (born 1955)
- Nils Olaf Chrisander (1884–1947)
- Irma Christenson (1915–1993)
- Malin Crépin (born 1978)
- Görel Crona (born 1959)

== D ==
- Eva Dahlbeck (1920–2008)
- Nils Dahlgren (1891–1948)
- Alexandra Dahlström (born 1984)
- Gus Dahlström (1906–1989)
- Peter Dalle (born 1956)
- Valdemar Dalquist (1888–1937)
- Bengt Dalqvist (born 1975)
- Tage Danielsson (1928–1985)
- Amy Deasismont (born 1992)
- John Degerberg (1892–1972)
- Rolf Degerlund (born 1952)
- Pia Degermark (born 1949)
- Betty Deland (1831–1882)
- Carl-Magnus Dellow (born 1951)
- Carl Deurell (1868–1962)
- Suzanna Dilber (born 1976)
- Bengt Djurberg (1898–1941)
- Fredrik Dolk (born 1961)
- Märta Dorff (1909–1990)
- Henrik Dorsin (born 1977)
- Axel Düberg (1927–2001)
- Jörgen Düberg (born 1956)
- Julia Dufvenius (born 1975)
- Karl Dyall (born 1967)
- Sharon Dyall (born 1962)

== E ==
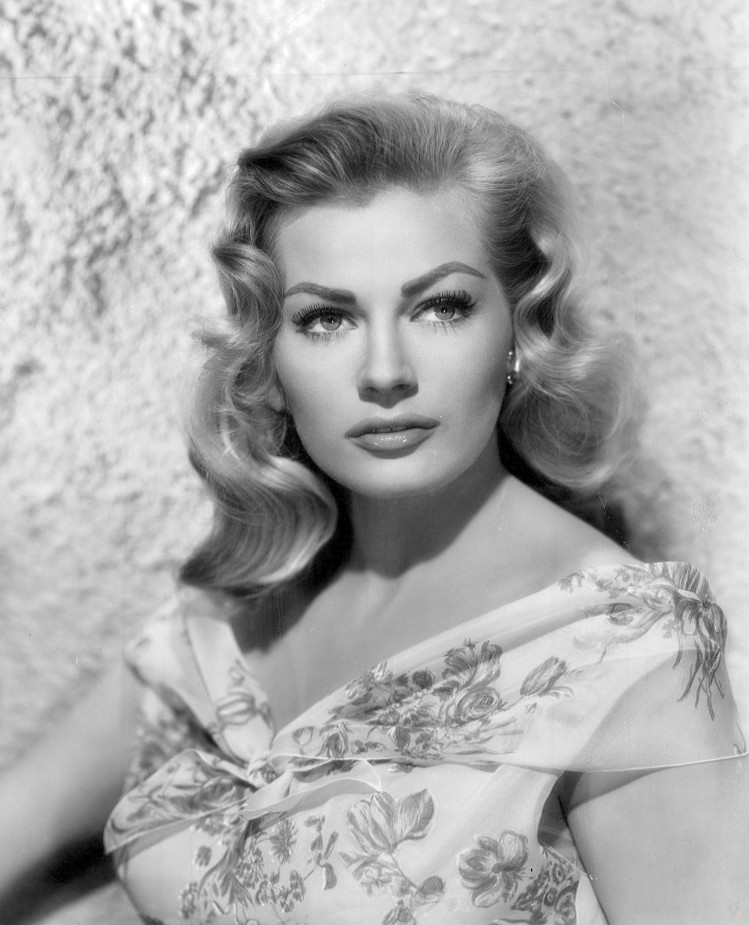
Anita Ekberg

- Dagmar Ebbesen (1891–1954)
- Elsa Ebbesen (1890–1977)
- Agneta Eckemyr (1950–2018)
- Rafael Edholm (born 1966)
- Tove Edfeldt (born 1983)
- Louise Edlind Friberg (born 1946)
- Lars Edström (born 1935)
- Allan Edwall (1924–1997)
- Per Eggers (born 1951)
- Lottie Ejebrant (born 1944)
- Anders Ek (1916–1975)
- Elin Ek (born 1976)
- Malin Ek (born 1945)
- Anita Ekberg (1931–2015)
- Stina Ekblad (born 1954)
- Anders Ekborg (born 1960)
- Dan Ekborg (born 1955)
- Lars Ekborg (1926–1969)
- Karin Ekelund (1913–1976)
- Bengt Ekerot (1920–1971)
- Britt Ekland (born 1942)
- Bengt Eklund (1925–1998)
- Ernst Eklund (1882–1971)
- Jakob Eklund (born 1962)
- Mira Eklund (born 1981)
- Nils Eklund (born 1927)
- Sigge Eklund (born 1974)
- Ulf Eklund (born 1951)
- Gösta Ekman (1890–1938)
- Gösta Ekman (1939–2017)
- Hasse Ekman (1915–2004)
- John Ekman (1880–1949)
- Agneta Ekmanner (born 1938)
- Thérèse Elfforss (1823–1905)
- John Elfström (1902–1981)
- Sten Elfström (1942–2024)
- Carl-Axel Elfving (1920–1988)
- Jimmy Endeley (born 1971)
- Lena Endre (born 1955)
- Lina Englund (born 1975)
- Peter Engman (born 1963)
- Hans V. Engström (1949–2014)
- Malena Engström (born 1967)
- Siv Ericks (1918–2005)
- Jacob Ericksson (1967–2025)
- Annalisa Ericson (1913–2011)
- Eric Ericson (born 1974)
- Nils Ericson (1906–1980)
- Stig Ossian Ericson (1923–2012)
- Sture Ericson (1912–1979)
- Anna Ulrica Ericsson (born 1966)
- John Ericsson (1883–1945)
- David Erikson (1899–1973)
- Anders Eriksson (born 1956)
- Charlotta Eriksson (1794–1862)
- John Axel Eriksson (born 1978)
- Sussie Eriksson (born 1963)
- Irma Erixson (born 1937)
- Hans Ernback (1942–2013)
- Malena Ernman (born 1970)
- Suzanne Ernrup (born 1954)
- Katarina Ewerlöf (born 1959)

== F ==
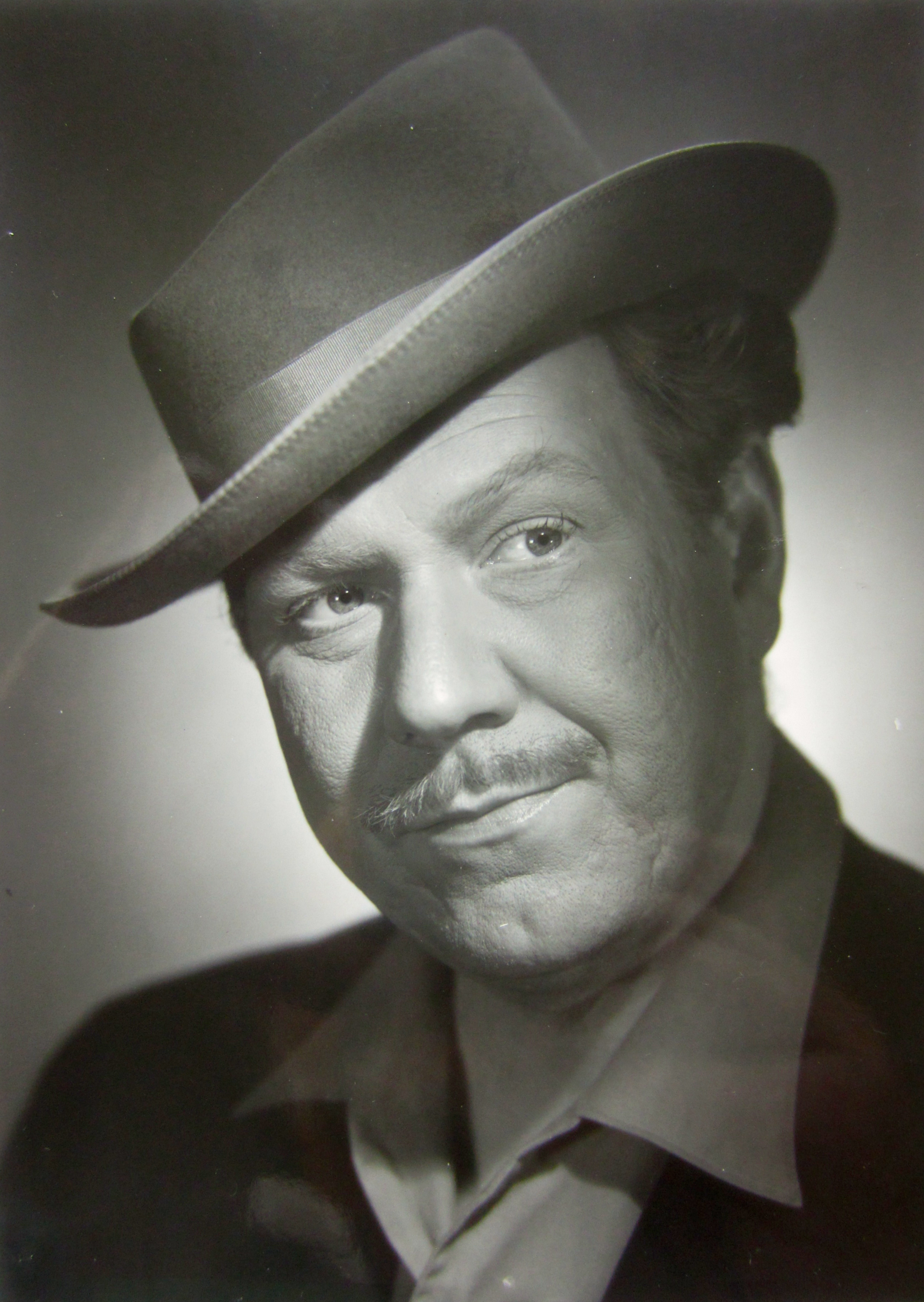
Åke Fridell

- Margareta Fahlén (1918–1978)
- Åke Falck (1925–1974)
- Ragnar Falck (1905–1966)
- Jonas Falk (1944–2010)
- Lauritz Falk (1909–1990)
- Niklas Falk (born 1947)
- Loa Falkman (born 1947)
- Christer Fant (born 1953)
- George Fant (1916–1998)
- Kenne Fant (1923–2016)
- Hampe Faustman (1919–1961)
- Rebecca Ferguson (born 1983)
- Arthur Fischer (1897–1991)
- Siegfried Fischer (1894–1976)
- Emil Fjellström (1884–1944)
- Aron Flam (born 1978)
- Karl Erik Flens (1913–1975)
- Thorsten Flinck (born 1961)
- Christer Flodin (born 1948)
- Barbro Flodquist (1919–1971)
- Gösta Folke (1913–2008)
- Emil Forselius (1974–2010)
- Göran Forsmark (1955–2020)
- Maria Franck (1769–1847)
- Karin Franz Körlof (born 1986)
- Gunnel Fred (born 1955)
- Ulf Friberg (born 1962)
- Åke Fridell (1919–1985)
- Gertrud Fridh (1921–1984)
- Semmy Friedmann (1891–1964)
- Elisabeth Frisk (1909–1986)
- Per Fritzell (born 1955)
- Cecilia Frode (born 1970)
- Samuel Fröler (born 1957)
- Ewa Fröling (born 1952)
- Tilde Fröling (born 1980)
- Basia Frydman (1946–2016)
- Eva Funck (born 1956)
- Georg Funkquist (1900–1986)
- Sigge Fürst (1905–1984)
- Gert Fylking (born 1945)

== G ==
Greta Garbo

- Thomas Gabrielsson (born 1963)
- Claudia Galli (born 1978)
- Sven-Eric Gamble (1924–1976)
- Yngve Gamlin (1926–1995)
- Moa Gammel (born 1980)
- Greta Garbo (1905–1990)
- Malte Gårdinger (born 2000)
- Pontus Gårdinger (born 1964)
- Hilding Gavle (1901–1969)
- Ida Gawell-Blumenthal (1869–1953)
- Björn Gedda (born 1942)
- Mona Geijer-Falkner (1887–1973)
- Göran Gentele (1917–1972)
- Ludde Gentzel (1885–1963)
- Karl Gerhard (1891–1964)
- Inga Gill (1925–2000)
- Göran Gillinger (born 1973)
- Fanny Gjörup (1961–2001)
- Malin Gjörup (1964–2020)
- Johan Glans (born 1974)
- Anton Glanzelius (born 1974)
- Anna Godenius (born 1944)
- Stefan Gödicke (born 1970)
- Marie Göranzon (born 1942)
- Göran Graffman (1931–2014)
- Matilda Grahn (born 1995)
- Wallis Grahn (1945–2018)
- Fredde Granberg (born 1970)
- Philomène Grandin (born 1974)
- Björn Granath (1946–2017)
- Lena Granhagen (born 1938)
- Kerstin Granlund (born 1951)
- Göthe Grefbo (1921–1991)
- Gösta Grip (1904–1998)
- Åke Grönberg (1914–1969)
- Valborg Elisabeth Groning (1890–1970)
- Svante Grundberg (1943–2019)
- Per Grundén (1922–2011)
- Stig Grybe (1928–2017)
- Nina Gunke (born 1955)
- Fredrik Gunnarsson (born 1965)
- Ernst Günther (1933–1999)
- Björn Gustafson (born 1934)
- Eric Gustafson (1897–1981)
- Gösta Gustafson (1886–1963)
- Björn Gustafsson (born 1986)
- Pontus Gustafsson (born 1955)
- Robert Gustafsson (born 1964)
- Ann-Marie Gyllenspetz (1932–1999)

== H ==
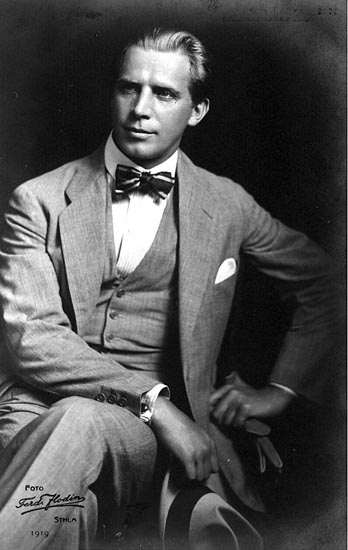
Lars Hanson

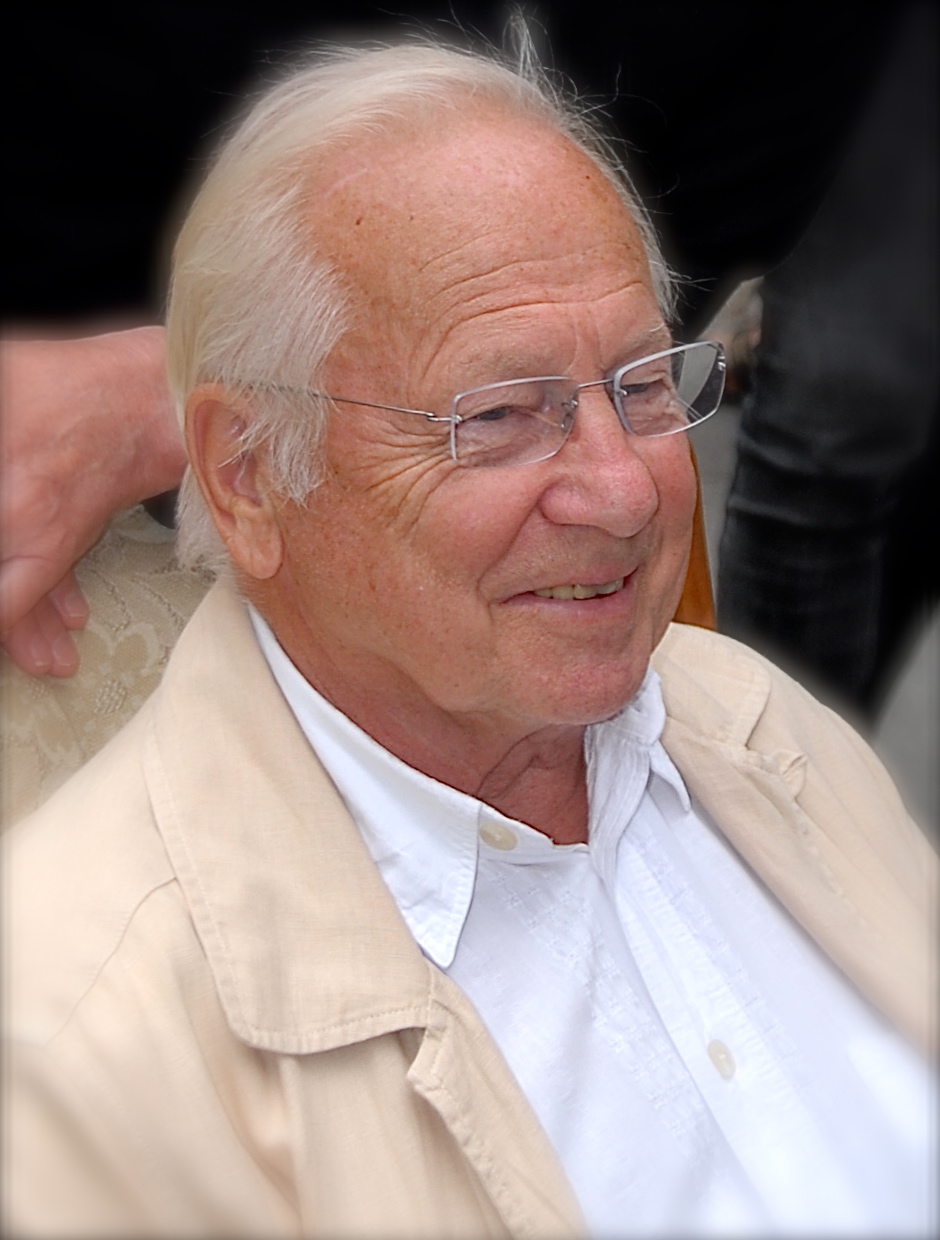
Ingvar Hirdwall

- Benny Haag (born 1961)
- Martina Haag (born 1964)
- Peter Haber (born 1952)
- Carl-Einar Häckner (born 1969)
- Douglas Håge (1898–1959)
- Helge Hagerman (1910–1995)
- Carl Hagman (1890–1949)
- Emy Hagman (1906–1976)
- Gerd Hagman (1919–2011)
- Justus Hagman (1859–1936)
- Berta Hall (1909–1999)
- Cecilia Häll (born 1978)
- Nils Hallberg (1921–2010)
- Jan "Janne" Halldorff (1939–2010)
- Leo Hallerstam (born 1986)
- Staffan Hallerstam (born 1957)
- Frida Hallgren (born 1974)
- Annika Hallin (born 1968)
- Gustaf Hammarsten (born 1967)
- Harald Hamrell (born 1960)
- Einar Hanson (1899–1927)
- Lars Hanson (1886–1965)
- Catherine Hansson (born 1958)
- Lena T. Hansson (born 1955)
- Maud Hansson (1937–2020)
- Thomas Hanzon (born 1962)
- Magnus Härenstam (1941–2015)
- Ellen Hartman (1860–1945)
- John Harryson (1926–2008)
- Peter Harryson (born 1948)
- Marcus Hasselborg (born 1986)
- Jenny Hasselquist (1894–1978)
- Ulf Hasseltorp (born 1960)
- Hugo Hasslo (1911–1994)
- Harry Hasso (1904–1984)
- Signe Hasso (1915–2002)
- Grete Havnesköld (born 1986)
- Stina Hedberg (1887–1981)
- Julia Hede (born 1962)
- Kåre Hedebrant (born 1995)
- Johan Hedenberg (born 1954)
- Sonya Hedenbratt (1931–2001)
- Solveig Hedengran (1910–1956)
- Thomas Hedengran (born 1965)
- Roland Hedlund (1933–2019)
- Ivan Hedqvist (1880–1935)
- Gerd Hegnell (born 1935)
- Carl-Axel Heiknert (1924–1981)
- Agda Helin (1894–1984)
- Sofia Helin (born 1972)
- Erik Hell (1911–1973)
- Thomas Hellberg (1941–2023)
- David Hellenius (born 1974)
- Gunnar Hellström (1928–2001)
- Rebecka Hemse (born 1975)
- Eva Henning (1920–2016)
- Uno Henning (1895–1970)
- Anders Henrikson (1896–1965)
- Krister Henriksson (born 1946)
- Dominik Henzel (born 1964)
- Bertram Heribertson (born 1955)
- Felix Herngren (born 1967)
- Måns Herngren (born 1965)
- Weyler Hildebrand (1890–1944)
- Olle Hilding (1898–1983)
- Gösta Hillberg (1877–1958)
- Linnéa Hillberg (1892–1977)
- Torsten Hillberg (1892–1954)
- Barbro Hiort af Ornäs (1921–2015)
- Ingvar Hirdwall (1934–2023)
- Keve Hjelm (1922–2004)
- Henrik Hjelt (born 1968)
- Folke Hjort (1934–1977)
- Lars Hjortsberg (1772–1843)
- Embla Hjulström (born 1994)
- Lennart Hjulström (1938–2022)
- Niklas Hjulström (born 1962)
- Gerhard Hoberstorfer (born 1963)
- Anna Hofman-Uddgren (1868–1947)
- Axel Högel (1884–1970)
- Erika Höghede (born 1963)
- Bo Höglund (born 1948)
- Holger Höglund (1906–1965)
- Magda Holm (1898–1982)
- Rut Holm (1900–1971)
- Britta Holmberg (1921–2004)
- Henric Holmberg (1946–2026)
- Sven Holmberg (1918–2003)
- Weiron Holmberg (born 1935)
- Sigrid Holmquist (1899–1970)
- Karl-Arne Holmsten (1911–1995)
- Heinz Hopf (1934–2001)
- Jens Hultén (born 1963)
- Petra Hultgren (born 1972)
- Axel Hultman (1869–1935)
- Ebba Hultkvist (born 1983)
- Peter Hüttner (born 1945)
- Maud Hyttenberg (1920–2009)

== I ==
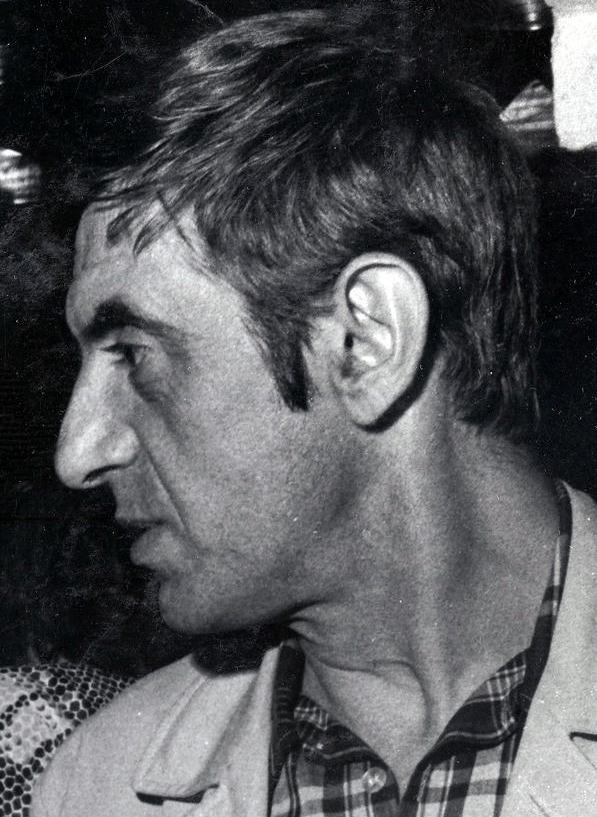
Tor Isedal

- Yohanna Idha (born 1978)
- Tor Isedal (1924–1990)

== J ==
- Ulla Jacobsson (1929–1982)
- Lennart Jähkel (born 1956)
- Adolf Jahr (1893–1964)
- Haddy Jallow (born 1985)
- Kristina Jämtmark (born 1957)
- Ingrid Janbell (born 1955)
- Ernst-Hugo Järegård (1928–1998)
- Liva Järnefelt (1896–1971), opera singer
- Anna Järphammar (born 1968)
- Stig Järrel (1910–1998)
- Sven Jerring (1895–1979)
- Peter Jöback (born 1971)
- Lisskulla Jobs (1906–1996)
- Stig Johanson (1919–1986)
- Ulf Johanson (1922–1990)
- Douglas Johansson(born 1960)
- Lilian Johansson (born 1948)
- Maria Johansson (born 1956)
- Pia Johansson (born 1960)
- Mary Johnson (1896–1975)
- Tor Johnson (1903–1971)
- Charlotta Jonsson (born 1973)
- Gun Jönsson (1929–2021)
- Jan-Ove "Jojje" Jönsson (born 1955)
- Nine-Christine Jönsson (1926–2011)
- Ulrika Jonsson (born 1967)
- Erland Josephson (1923–2012)
- Ludde Juberg (1884–1968)
- Inger Juel (1926–1979)
- Karin Juel (1900–1976)
- Ester Julin (1885–1931)

== K ==
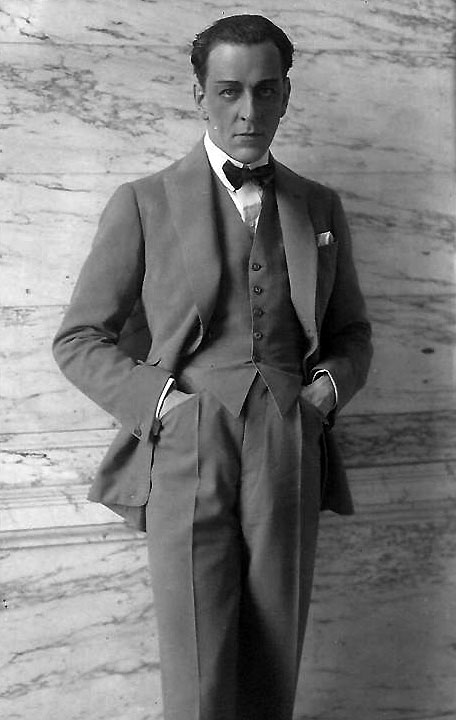
Ivar Kåge

- Ivar Kåge (1881–1951)
- Helena Kallenbäck (born 1944)
- Anna Kristina Kallin (1953–2004)
- Alexander Karim (born 1976)
- Jonas Karlsson (born 1971)
- Jonas Karlström (born 1978)
- Lo Kauppi (born 1970)
- Karin Kavli (1906–1990)
- Sam Kessel (born 1989)
- Magnus Kesster (1901–1975)
- Nils Kihlberg (1915–1965)
- Staffan Kihlbom (born 1964)
- Jullan Kindahl (1885–1979)
- Joel Kinnaman (born 1979)
- Melinda Kinnaman (born 1971)
- Nadine Kirschon (born 1984)
- Felix Kjellberg (born 1989)
- Lillebil Kjellén (1921–1994)
- Alf Kjellin (1920–1988)
- Björn Kjellman (born 1963)
- Ingvar Kjellson (1923–2014)
- Georg af Klercker (1877–1951)
- Elin Klinga (born 1969)
- Hans Klinga (1949–2025)
- Mårten Klingberg (born 1968)
- Kolbjörn Knudsen (1897–1967)
- Barbro Kollberg (1917–2014)
- Tommy Körberg (born 1948)
- Gösta Krantz (1925–2008)
- Lasse Krantz (1903–1973)
- Magnus Krepper (born 1967)
- Bianca Kronlöf (born 1985)
- Margaretha Krook (1925–2001)
- Jarl Kulle (1927–1997)
- Maria Kulle (born 1960)
- Andreas Kundler (born 1970)
- Sissela Kyle (born 1957)
- Ann-Sofie Kylin (born 1955)

== L ==
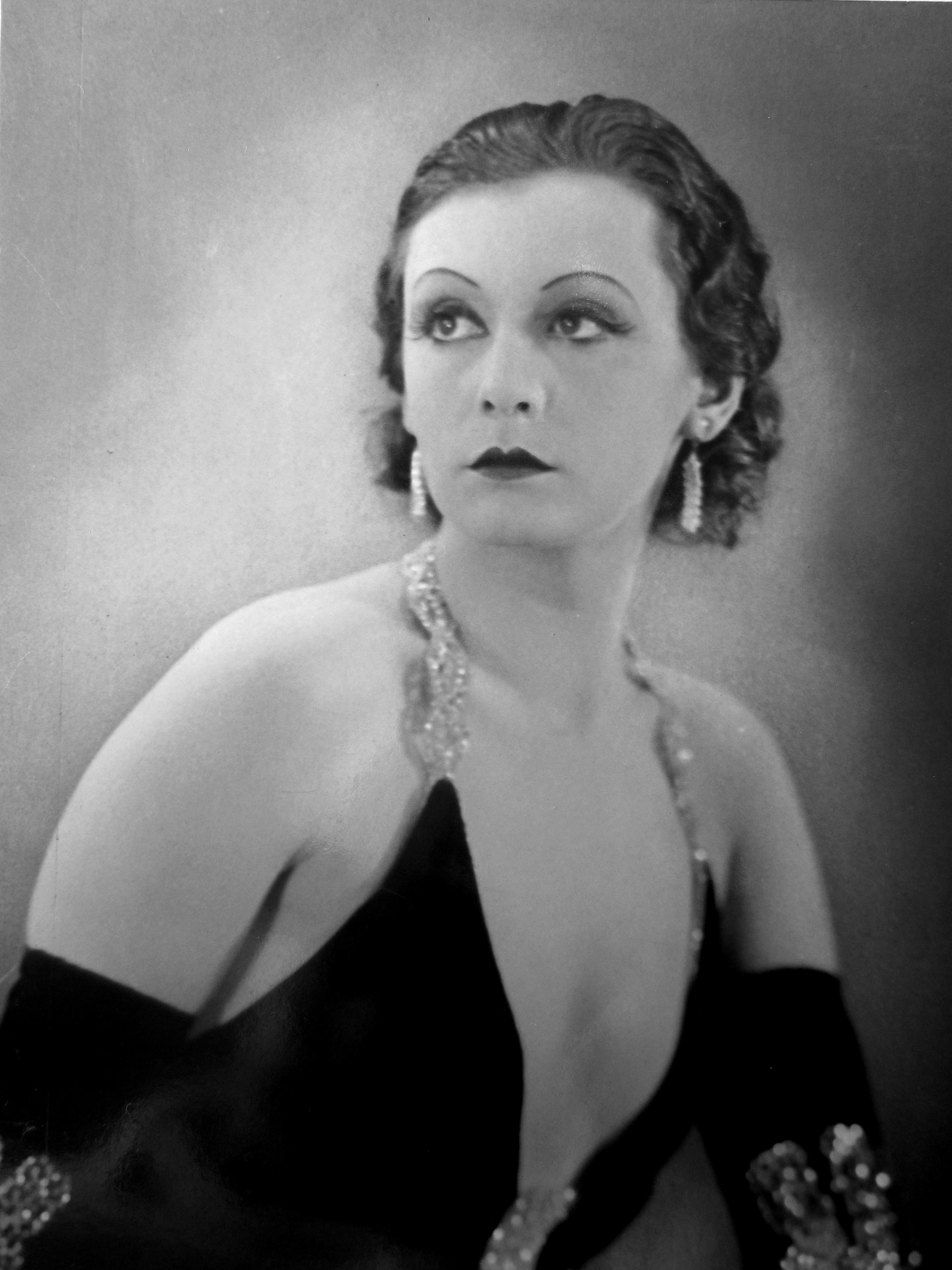
Zarah Leander

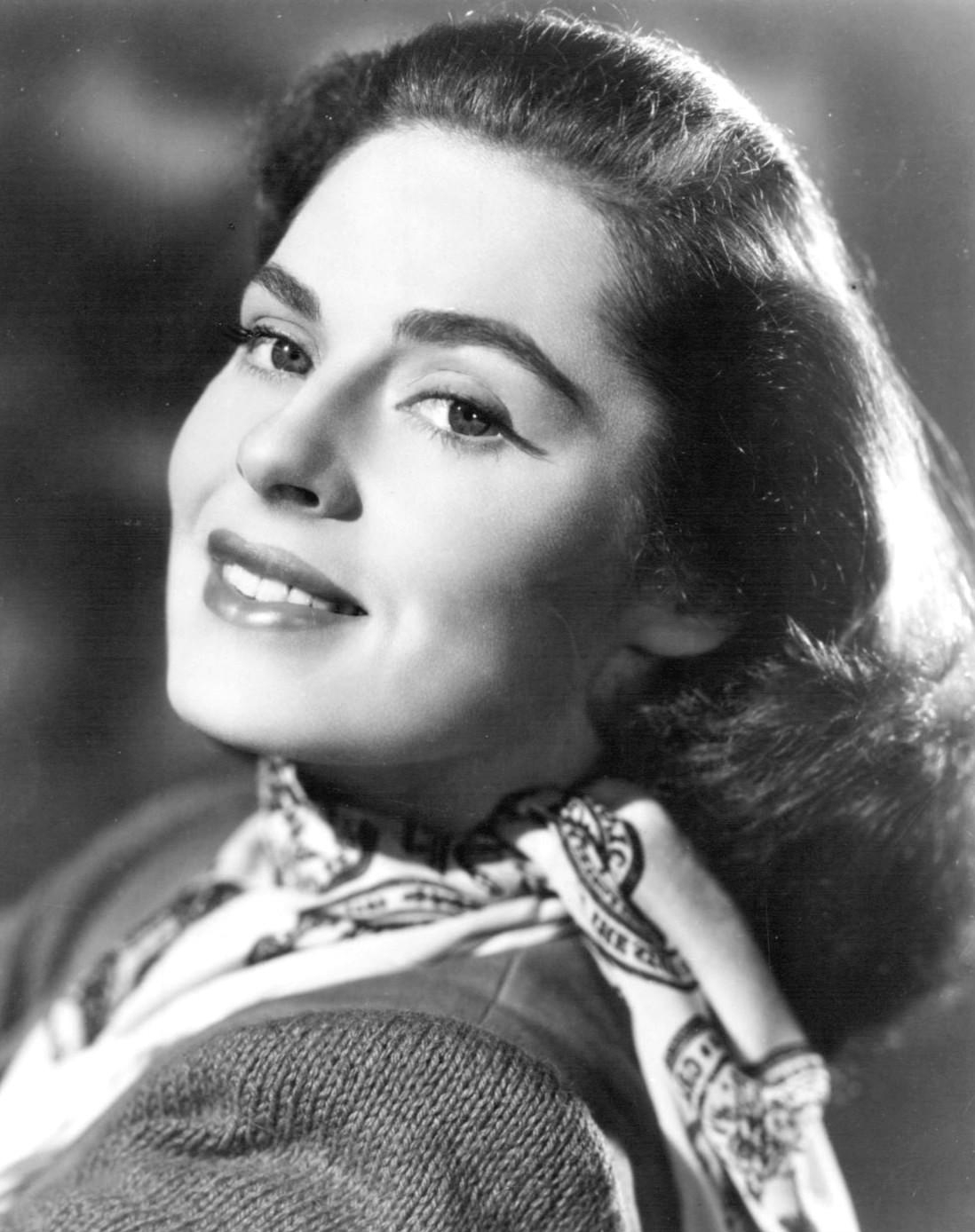
Viveca Lindfors

- Marika Lagercrantz (born 1954)
- Sture Lagerwall (1908–1964)
- Inga Landgré (1927–2023)
- Eivor Landström (1919–2004)
- Maria Langhammer (born 1962)
- Karin Lannby (1916–2007)
- Jörgen Lantz (born 1943)
- Babben Larsson (born 1956)
- Chatarina Larsson (born 1947)
- William Larsson (1873–1926)
- Rolf Lassgård (born 1955)
- Eric Laurent (1894–1958)
- Zarah Leander (1907–1981)
- Lina Leandersson (born 1995)
- Sofia Ledarp (born 1974)
- Tina Leijonberg (born 1962)
- Ken Lennaárd (born 1971)
- Birger Lensander (1908–1971)
- Malin Levanon (born 1977)
- Gustav Levin (born 1952)
- Carina Lidbom (born 1957)
- Anki Lidén (born 1947)
- Jessica Liedberg (born 1969)
- Rebecka Liljeberg (born 1981)
- Marie Liljedahl (born 1950)
- Jonna Liljendahl (born 1970)
- Leif Liljeroth (1924–2018)
- Torsten Lilliecrona (1921–1999)
- Dagny Lind (1902–1992)
- Anna Lindahl (1904–1952)
- Augusta Lindberg (1866–1943)
- Christina Lindberg (born 1950)
- Sven Lindberg (1918–2006)
- Arne Lindblad (1887–1964)
- Anita Lindblom (1937–2020)
- Gunnel Lindblom (1931–2021)
- Anders Linder (born 1941)
- Viveca Lindfors (1920–1995)
- Hans Lindgren (1932–2012)
- Lisa Lindgren (born 1968)
- Peter Lindgren (1915–1981)
- Sten Lindgren (1903–1959)
- Irene Lindh (born 1945)
- Anna Lindholm (born 1965)
- Ebba Lindkvist (1882–1942)
- Frej Lindqvist (born 1937)
- Jan Erik Lindqvist (1920–1988)
- Lasse Lindroth (1972–1999)
- Carl-Gustaf Lindstedt (1921–1992)
- Pierre Lindstedt (born 1943)
- Åke Lindström (1928–2002)
- Jörgen Lindström (born 1951)
- Marika Lindström (born 1946)
- Rune Lindström (1916–1973)
- Martin Ljung (1917–2010)
- Oscar Ljung (1909–1999)
- Sten Ljunggren (born 1938)
- Tom Ljungman (born 1991)
- Marianne Löfgren (1910–1957)
- Oskar Löfkvist (born 1980)
- Oliver Loftéen (born 1979)
- Bengt Logardt (1914–1994)
- Yvonne Lombard (born 1929)
- Anders Lönnbro (1945–2022)
- Ylva Lööf (born 1958)
- Tanja Lorentzon (born 1971)
- Lotta Losten (born 1981)
- Gustaf Lövås (1894–1968)
- Fredrique Löwen (1760–1813)
- Holger Löwenadler (1904–1977)
- Curt Löwgren (1908–1967)
- Oskar A. C. Lund (1885–1963)
- Regina Lund (born 1967)
- Richard Lund (1885–1960)
- Alfred Lundberg (1852–1935)
- Anna Lundberg (born 1994)
- Signe Lundberg-Settergren (1882–1967)
- Nils Lundell (1889–1943)
- Gerda Lundequist (1871–1959)
- Adam Lundgren (born 1986)
- Dolph Lundgren (born 1957)
- Anders Lundin (born 1958)
- Åke Lundqvist (1936–2021)
- Anja Lundqvist (born 1971)
- Anton Lundqvist (born 1989)
- Maria Lundqvist (born 1963)
- Henrik Lundström (born 1983)
- Ingrid Luterkort (1910–2011)
- Magna Lykseth-Skogman (1874–1949), opera singer

== M ==
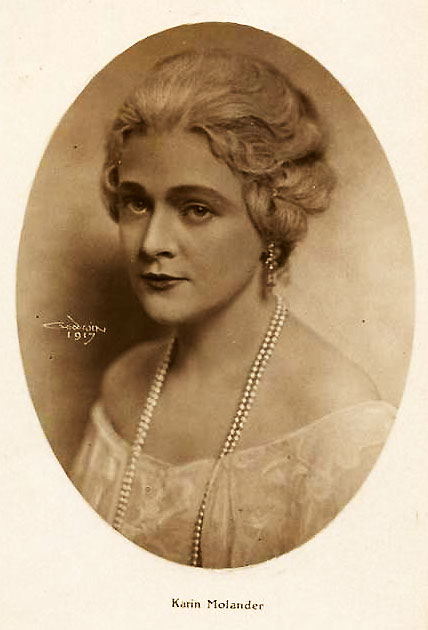
Karin Molander

- Lakke Magnusson (1946–2004)
- Peter Magnusson (born 1974)
- Sven Magnusson (1908–1962)
- Tova Magnusson (born 1968)
- Mona Malm (1935–2021)
- Claes Malmberg (born 1961)
- Dag Malmberg (born 1953)
- Siw Malmkvist (born 1936)
- Jan Malmsjö (born 1932)
- Jonas Malmsjö (born 1971)
- Birger Malmsten (1920–1991)
- Sune Mangs (1932–1994)
- Segol Mann (1918–1992)
- Claes Månsson (born 1950)
- Maritta Marke (1905–1983)
- Mona Mårtenson (1902–1956)
- Curt Masreliez (1919–1979)
- Ellen Mattsson (born 1973)
- Emma Meissner (1866–1942)
- Eva Melander (born 1974)
- Sven Melander (1947–2022)
- John Melin (1895–1966)
- Börje Mellvig (1911–1998)
- Livia Millhagen (born 1973)
- Liv Mjönes (born 1979)
- Thor Modéen (1898–1950)
- Jan Molander (1920–2009)
- Karin Molander (1889–1978)
- Per Morberg (born 1960)
- Hans Mosesson (1944–2023)
- Jan Mybrand (born 1959)
- Per Myrberg (1933–2023)

== N ==
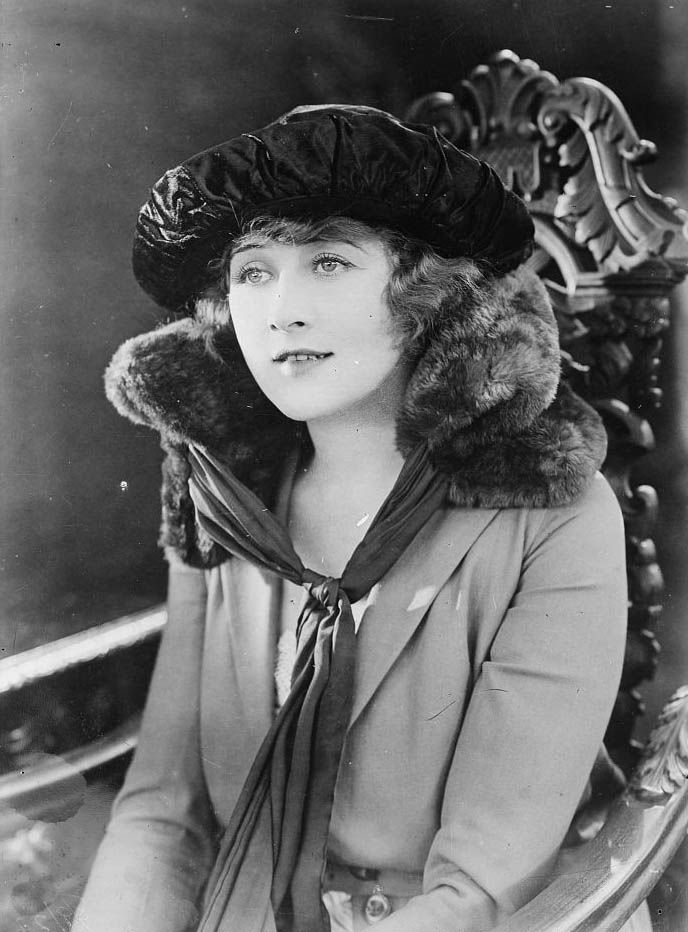
Anna Q. Nilsson

- Arsi Nami (born 1984)
- Måns Nathanaelson (born 1976)
- Gull Natorp (1880–1962)
- Joakim Nätterqvist (born 1974)
- Josefin Neldén (born 1984)
- Mimi Nelson (1922–1999)
- Gunnar Nielsen (1919–2009)
- Monica Nielsen (1937–2025)
- Lis Nilheim (1944–2025)
- Carlotta Nillson (1876–1951)
- Anna Q. Nilsson (1888–1974)
- Bengt Nilsson (born 1967)
- Cecilia Nilsson (born 1957)
- Inger Nilsson (born 1959)
- Kjell Nilsson (born 1949)
- Maj-Britt Nilsson (1924–2006)
- Liam Norberg (born 1969)
- Ika Nord (born 1960)
- Olle Nordemar (1914–1999)
- Yngve Nordwall (1908–1994)
- Henrik Norlén (born 1970)
- Figge Norling (born 1965)
- Anna Norrie (1860–1957)
- John Norrman (1884–1966)
- Simon Norrthon (born 1967)
- Bertil Norström (1923–2012)
- Tomas Norström (1956–2021)
- Tuva Novotny (born 1979)
- Börje Nyberg (1920–2005)
- Jan Nygren (1934–2019)
- Lena Nyman (1944–2011)
- Michael Nyqvist (1960–2017)
- Anders Nyström (1933–2022)

== O, Ö ==
- Brita Öberg (1900–1969)
- Barbro Oborg (born 1941)
- Gabriel Odenhammar (born 1983)
- Åke Ohberg (1905–1975)
- Fredrik Ohlsson (1931–2023)
- Jan Ohlsson (born 1962)
- Warner Oland (1879–1938)
- Anna Olin (1881–1946)
- Elisabeth Olin (1740–1828)
- Lena Olin (born 1955)
- Stig Olin (1920–2008)
- Pale Olofsson (born 1947)
- Ann-Margret Olsson (born 1941) (aka Ann-Margret) (naturalized American citizen)
- Dagmar Olsson (1908–1980)
- Gunilla Olsson (born 1947)
- Gunnar Olsson (1904–1983)
- Ingela Olsson (born 1958)
- Amanda Ooms (born 1964)
- Aliette Opheim (born 1985)
- Thomas Oredsson (born 1946)
- Anna Oscàr (1875–1915)
- Per Oscarsson (1927–2010)
- Klas Östergren (born 1955)

== P ==
- Lisette Pagler (born 1981)
- Ulf Palme (1920–1993)
- Aurore Palmgren (1880–1961)
- Adam Pålsson (born 1988)
- Bosse Parnevik (born 1938)
- Lars Passgård (1941–2003)
- Toivo Pawlo (1917–1979)
- Mikael Persbrandt (born 1963)
- Essy Persson (born 1941)
- Edvard Persson (1888–1957)
- Mim Persson (1902–1982)
- Willy Peters (1915–1976)
- Ivan Mathias Petersson (born 1971)
- Torkel Petersson (born 1969)
- Gio Petré (born 1937)
- Ann Petrén (born 1954)
- Erik A. Petschler (1881–1945)
- Hjördis Petterson (1908–1988)
- Lasse Petterson (1935–2019)
- Mimi Pollak (1903–1999)
- Gunvor Pontén (1929–2023)
- Nils Poppe (1908–2000)
- Charlotte Pousette (1832–1877)
- Mauritz Pousette (1824–1883)
- Gösta Prüzelius (1922–2000)
- Agneta Prytz (1916–2008)

== Q ==
- Isa Quensel (1905–1982)

== R ==
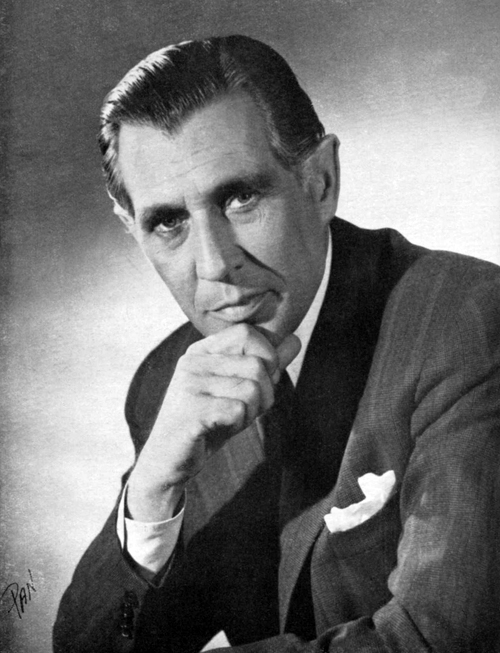
Georg Rydeberg

- Charlotta Raa-Winterhjelm (1838–1907)
- Johan Rabaeus (born 1947)
- Per Ragnar (born 1941)
- Arne Ragneborn (1926–1978)
- Göran Ragnerstam (born 1957)
- Örjan Ramberg (born 1948)
- Povel Ramel (1922–2007)
- Susanna Ramel (1920–2020)
- Albert Ranft (1858–1938)
- Peter Rangmar (1956–1997)
- Noomi Rapace (born 1979)
- Ola Rapace (born 1971)
- Alexandra Rapaport (born 1971)
- Stina Rautelin (born 1963)
- Kajsa Reingardt (born 1957)
- Eva Remaeus (1950–1993)
- Suzanne Reuter (born 1952)
- Med Reventberg (1947–2021)
- Johan Rheborg (born 1963)
- Fridolf Rhudin (1895–1935)
- Marie Richardson (born 1959)
- Olav Riégo (1891–1956)
- Axel Ringvall (1860–1927)
- Jan Rippe (born 1955)
- Annica Risberg (born 1941)
- Marie Robertson (born 1977)
- Ester Roeck-Hansen (1897–1987)
- Harry Roeck-Hansen (1891–1959)
- Frida Röhl (born 1971)
- Artur Rolén (1894–1972)
- Ernst Rolf (1891–1932)
- Shanti Roney (born 1970)
- Ingeborg Rönnblad (1873–1915)
- Gunilla Röör (born 1959)
- Bellan Roos (1901–1990)
- Magnus Roosmann (born 1963)
- Oscar Rosander (1901–1971)
- Eva Röse (born 1973)
- Elsa-Marianne von Rosen (1924–2014)
- Erik Rosén (1883–1967)
- Birgit Rosengren (1912–2011)
- Emelie Rosenqvist (born 1980)
- Wanda Rothgardt (1905–1950)
- Mats Rudal (born 1963)
- Teodor Runsiö (born 1995)
- Sif Ruud (1916–2011)
- Eva Rydberg (born 1943)
- Georg Rydeberg (1907–1983)
- Edvin Ryding (born 2003)
- Viran Rydkvist (1879–1942)

== S ==
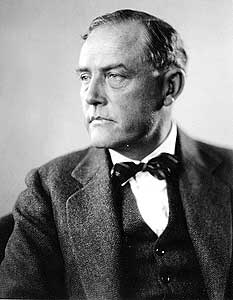
Victor Sjöström

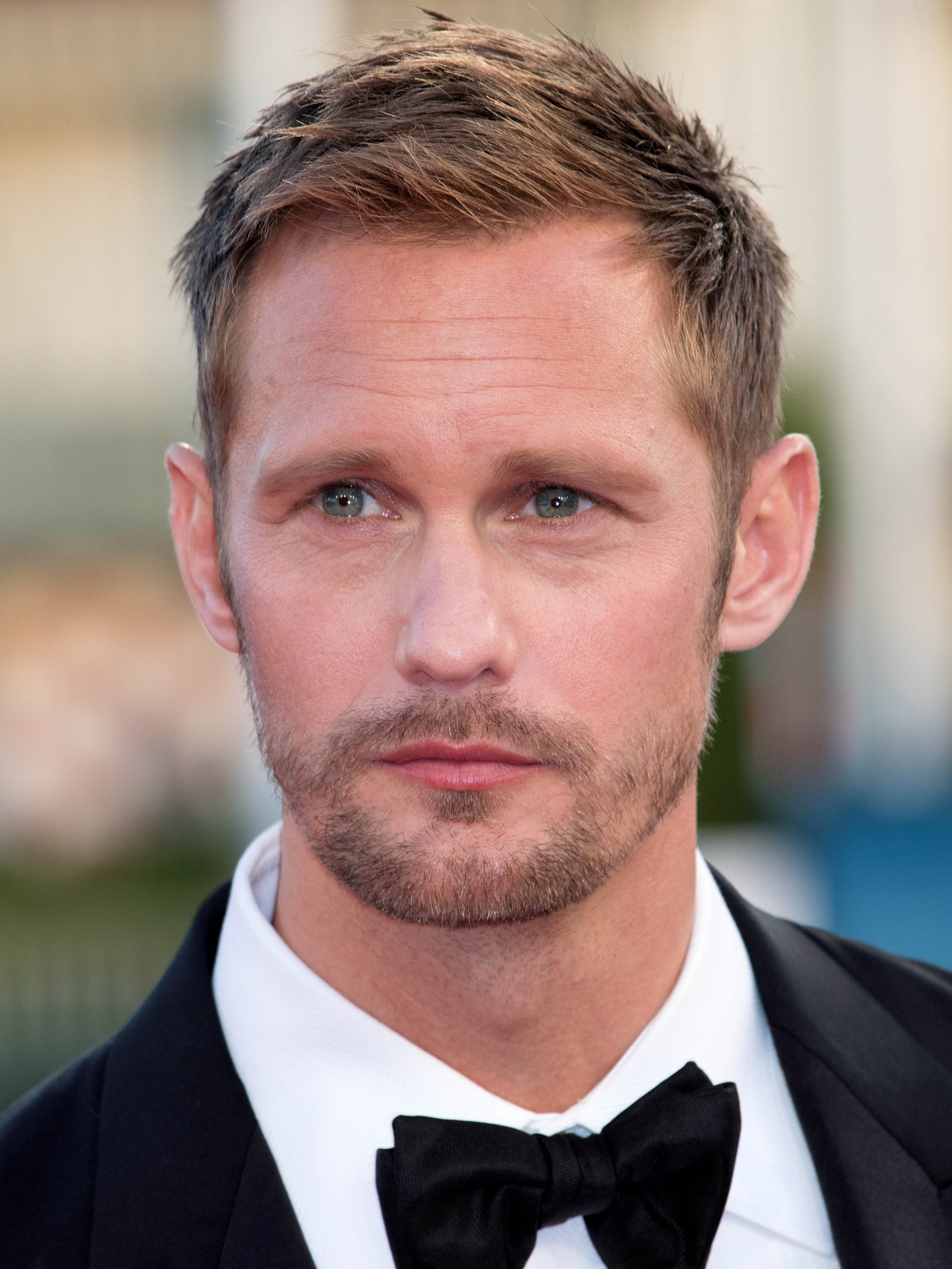
Alexander Skarsgård

- Jesper Salén (born 1978)
- Ulla Sallert (1923–2018)
- Reuben Sallmander (born 1966)
- Johanna Sällström (1974–2007)
- Mikael Samuelson (born 1951)
- Magnus Samuelsson (born 1969)
- Olof Sandborg (1884–1965)
- Per Sandborgh (born 1945)
- Helena af Sandeberg (born 1971)
- Junie Sandgren (born 2004)
- Olle Sarri (born 1972)
- Stefan Sauk (born 1955)
- Rebecca Scheja (born 1989)
- Henrik Schildt (1914–2001)
- Peter Schildt (born 1951)
- Vera Schmiterlöw (1904–1987)
- Hanna Schmitz (born 1976)
- Christina Schollin (born 1937)
- Michael Segerström (born 1944)
- Mona Seilitz (1943–2008)
- Concordia Selander (1861–1935)
- Hjalmar Selander (1859–1928)
- Karl Seldahl (born 1975)
- Viveka Seldahl (1944–2001)
- Viveca Serlachius (1923–1993)
- Håkan Serner (1933–1984)
- Victoria Silvstedt (born 1974)
- André Sjöberg (born 1974)
- Gunnar Sjöberg (1909–1977)
- Tekla Sjöblom (1878–1967)
- Ulla Sjöblom (1927–1989)
- Helen Sjöholm (born 1970)
- Vilgot Sjöman (1924–2006)
- Sture Sjöstedt (1916–2008)
- Arnold Sjöstrand (1903–1955)
- Per Sjöstrand (1930–2008)
- Victor Sjöström (1879–1960)
- Mia Skäringer (born 1976)
- Alexander Skarsgård (born 1976)
- Bill Skarsgård (born 1990)
- Gustaf Skarsgård (born 1980)
- Stellan Skarsgård (born 1951)
- Valter Skarsgård (born 1995)
- Georg Skarstedt (1900–1976)
- Björn Skifs (born 1947)
- Rolf Skoglund (1940–2022)
- Thore Skogman (1931–2007)
- Helge Skoog (1938–2025)
- Ulla Skoog (born 1951)
- Kristina Söderbaum (1912–2001)
- Dora Söderberg (1899–1990)
- Åke Söderblom (1910–1965)
- Lena Söderblom (born 1935)
- Lars Söderdahl (born 1964)
- Rolf Sohlman (born 1954)
- Sara Sommerfeld (born 1977)
- Camilla Sparv (born 1943)
- Tord Stål (1906–1972)
- Henrik Ståhl (born 1975)
- Stina Ståhle (1907–1971)
- Göran Stangertz (1944–2012)
- Mary Stävin (born 1957)
- Gaby Stenberg (1923–2011)
- Annette Stensson-Fjordefalk (born 1958)
- Ruth Stevens (1903–1989)
- Margareta Stone (born 1962)
- Emy Storm (1925–2014)
- Peter Stormare (born 1953)
- Hans Strååt (1917–1991)
- Charlott Strandberg (born 1962)
- Evabritt Strandberg (born 1943)
- Jan-Olof Strandberg (1926–2020)
- Ingeborg Strandin (1881–1948)
- Erik Strandmark (1919–1963)
- Anita Strindberg (born 1937)
- Anna-Lena Strindlund (born 1971)
- Bernt Ström (1940–2009)
- Carl Ström (1888–1957)
- Ewa Strömberg (1940–2013)
- Lena Strömdahl (born 1947)
- Lasse Strömstedt (1935–2009)
- Ulla Strömstedt (1939–1986)
- Katrin Sundberg (born 1962)
- Maria Sundbom (born 1975)
- Folke Sundquist (1925–2009)
- Frank Sundström (1912–1993)
- Doris Svedlund (1926–1985)
- Siri Svegler (born 1980)
- Tore Svennberg (1858–1941)
- Bo Svenson (born 1944)
- Allan Svensson (1951–2024)
- Per Svensson (born 1965)
- Karin Swanström (1873–1942)
- Tobias Swärd (born 1986)
- Carin Swensson (1905–1990)
- Max von Sydow (1929–2020)
- Kari Sylwan (born 1940)

== T ==
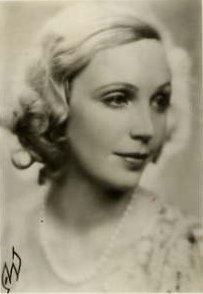
Inga Tidblad

- Aino Taube (1912–1990)
- Mathias Taube (1876–1934)
- Sven-Bertil Taube (1934–2022)
- Tora Teje (1893–1970)
- Lotta Tejle (born 1960)
- Birgit Tengroth (1915–1983)
- Leonard Terfelt (born 1976)
- Solveig Ternström (born 1937)
- Lil Terselius (1944–2021)
- Ester Textorius (1883–1972)
- Oskar Textorius (1864–1938)
- Claes Thelander (1916–1999)
- Göran Thorell (born 1954)
- Susanne Thorson (born 1981)
- Hans-Christian Thulin (born 1977)
- Ingrid Thulin (1926–2004)
- Olof Thunberg (1925–2020)
- Svante Thunberg (born 1969)
- Inga Tidblad (1901–1975)
- Kerstin Tidelius (1934–2023)
- Alice Timander (1915–2007)
- Ove Tjernberg (1928–2001)
- Rasmus Troedsson (born 1964)
- Märta Torén (1925–1957)
- Mikael Tornving (born 1961)
- Sara Torsslow (1795–1859)
- Jenny Tschernichin-Larsson (1867–1937)
- Mirja Turestedt (born 1972)
- Betty Tuvén (1928–1999)
- Jesper Tydén (born 1975)

== U ==
- Richard Ulfsäter (born 1975)
- Fredrik Ultvedt (born 1961)
- Johan Ulveson (born 1954)
- Jenny Ulving (born 1979)
- Bisse Unger (born 1994)

== V ==
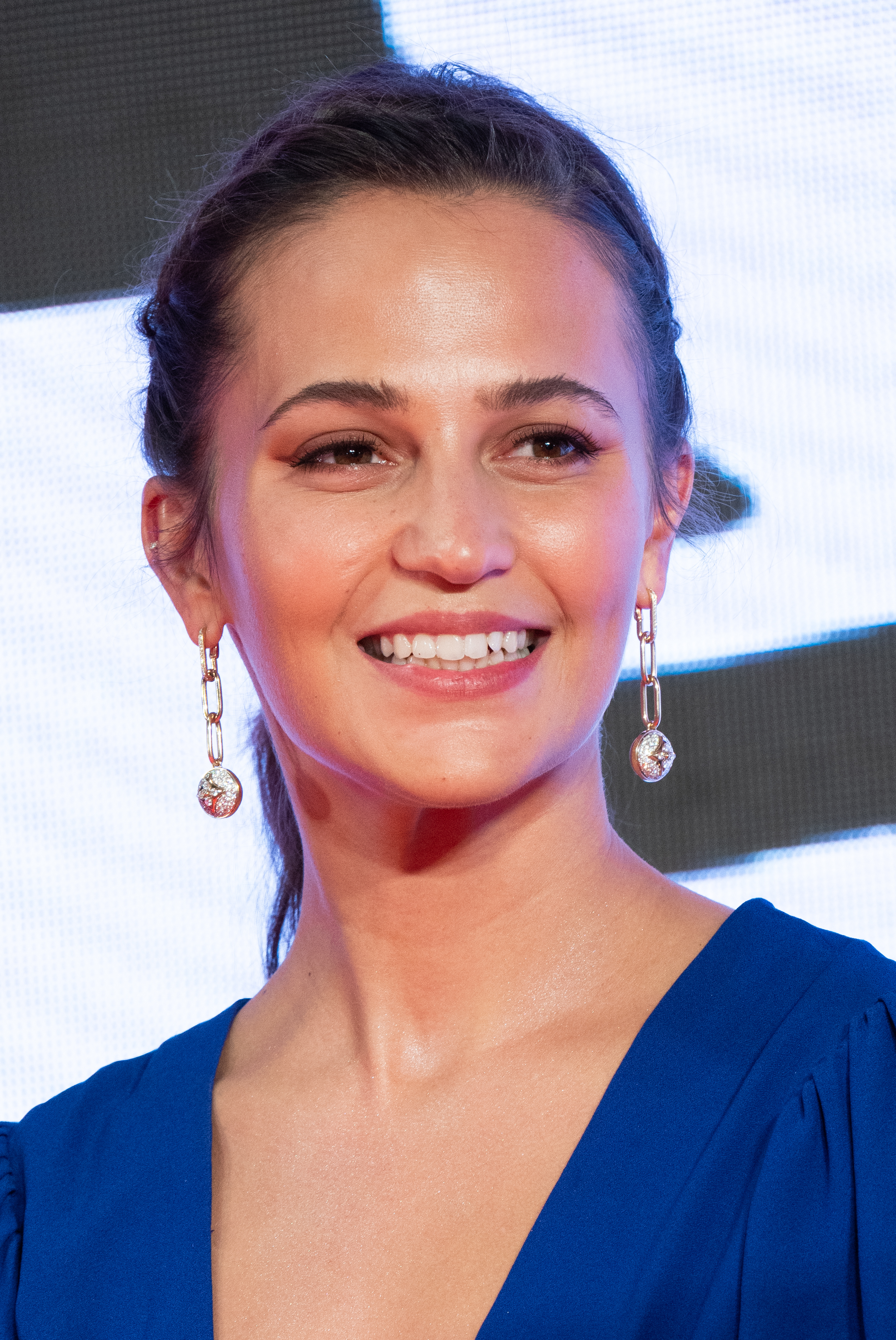
Alicia Vikander

- Birgitta Valberg (1916–2014)
- Matias Varela (born 1980)
- Bert-Åke Varg (1932–2022)
- Meta Velander (1924–2025)
- Inga-Bodil Vetterlund (1914–1980)
- Peter Viitanen (born 1980)
- Alicia Vikander (born 1988)

== W ==
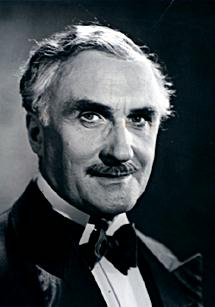
Olof Winnerstrand

- Anders de Wahl (1869–1956)
- Anna de Wahl (1844–1889)
- Gideon Wahlberg (1890–1948)
- Nils Wahlbom (1886–1937)
- Hans Wahlgren (1937–2024)
- Linus Wahlgren (born 1976)
- Pernilla Wahlgren (born 1967)
- Anita Wall (born 1940)
- Sigurd Wallén (1884–1947)
- Cissi Wallin (born 1985)
- Gunn Wållgren (1913–1983)
- Martin Wallström (born 1983)
- Gustaf Wally (1905–1966)
- August Warberg (1842–1915)
- Rakel Wärmländer (born 1980)
- Bullan Weijden (1901–1969)
- Ruth Weijden (1889–1956)
- Margreth Weivers (1926–2021)
- Öllegård Wellton (1932–1991)
- Lisa Werlinder (born 1972)
- Jessie Wessel (1894–1948)
- Kalle Westerdahl (born 1966)
- Håkan Westergren (1899–1981)
- Meg Westergren (born 1932)
- Catrin Westerlund (1934–1982)
- Bojan Westin (1926–2013)
- Johan Widerberg (born 1974)
- Ragnar Widestedt (1887–1954)
- Olof Widgren (1907–1999)
- Naima Wifstrand (1890–1968)
- Hans Wigren (born 1940)
- Claire Wikholm (born 1944)
- Iwar Wiklander (born 1939)
- Hedvig Willman (1841–1887)
- Andreas Wilson (born 1981)
- Carl-Gunnar Wingård (1894–1977)
- Frida Winnerstrand (1881–1943)
- Olof Winnerstrand (1875–1956)
- Signe Wirff (1887–1956)
- Lena Wisborg (born 1965)
- Rikard Wolff (1958–2017)
- Beppe Wolgers (1928–1986)
- Christopher Wollter (born 1972)
- Sven Wollter (1934–2020)

== Y ==
- Sebastian Ylvenius (born 1977)

== Z ==
- Ann Zacharias (born 1956)
- Sascha Zacharias (born 1979)
- Fylgia Zadig (1921–1994)
- Alice Bier Zandén (born 1995)
- Jessica Zandén (born 1957)
- Philip Zandén (born 1954)
- Tollie Zellman (1887–1964)
- Hanna Zetterberg (born 1973)
- Mai Zetterling (1925–1994)
- Monica Zetterlund (1937–2005)
- Lili Ziedner (1885–1939)

== See also ==
- List of former child actors from Sweden
- List of current child actors from Sweden
- List of Swedish people
- Lists of actors
