= Textorius =

Textorius is a surname. Notable people with the surname include:

- Ester Textorius (1883–1972), Swedish actress and opera singer, wife of Oskar
- Oskar Textorius (1864–1938), Swedish actor, singer, and theater director
