= Abrahamsson =

Abrahamsson is a patronymic Swedish surname. Notable people with the surname include:

- Alexander Abrahamsson (born 1999), Swedish footballer
- Carl Abrahamsson (1896–1948), Swedish ice hockey player
- Christer Abrahamsson (born 1947), Swedish ice hockey goaltender and coach
- Eric Abrahamsson (1890–1942), Swedish actor and comedian
- Erik Abrahamsson (1898–1965), Swedish athlete
- Frida Abrahamsson (born 1994), Swedish football defender
- Göran Abrahamsson (1931–2018), Swedish épée and foil fencer
- Gunilla Abrahamsson (born 1945), Swedish actress
- Henock Abrahamsson (1909–1958), Swedish football goalkeeper
- Josefin Abrahamsson (born 1979), Swedish table tennis player
- Maria Abrahamsson (born 1963), Swedish lawyer, journalist, and politician
- Peter Abrahamsson (born 1988), Swedish professional footballer
- Sejde Abrahamsson (born 1998), Swedish footballer
- Thommy Abrahamsson (born 1947), Swedish ice hockey defenceman
