= Rikberg =

Rikberg is a surname. Notable people with the surname include:

- Alar Rikberg (born 1981), Estonian indiaca player
- Nils Rikberg (1928–2002), Finnish football player
- Rait Rikberg (born 1982), Estonian volleyball player

== See also ==
- Risberg
