= Clas Lindberg =

Swedish director and screenwriter (born 1956)

- Born: Clas Ragnar Lindberg; 24 August 1956 (age 69); Lund, Sweden
- Occupations: Film director, screenwriter
- Years active: 1980–present

Clas Ragnar Lindberg (born 24 August 1956) is a Swedish director and screenwriter. Lindberg studied at Dramatiska Institutet in Stockholm. He won the award for Best Screenplay for the film Underground Secrets at the 27th Guldbagge Awards. At the 29th Guldbagge Awards, he won the award for Best Director for the film The Ferris Wheel.

== Direction ==
- 2004 – Farväl
- 2003 – Don't Cry Wolf
- 2002 – Pappa polis
- 1998 – Pip-Larssons
- 1997 – Min vän shejken i Stureby
- 1996 – Att stjäla en tjuv
- 1991 – Underground Secrets

== Screenwriting ==
- 2003 – Don't Cry Wolf
- 1996 – Att stjäla en tjuv
