= Underground Secrets =

1991 film

- Directed by: Clas Lindberg
- Written by: Clas Lindberg
- Produced by: Lennart Dunér
- Starring: Ulf Eklund
- Cinematography: Andra Lasmanis
- Release date: 22 February 1991
- Running time: 81 minutes
- Country: Sweden
- Language: Swedish

Underground Secrets (Swedish: Underjordens hemlighet) is a 1991 Swedish drama film directed by Clas Lindberg. Lindberg won the award for Best Screenplay and was nominated for Best Director at the 27th Guldbagge Awards.

== Cast ==
- Ulf Eklund as Doctor
- Gösta Ekman as Carson
- Anna-Yrsa Falenius as Nurse
- Jenny Fogelquist as Sjuksköterskeleven
- Gunnel Fred as Nisse's mother
- Robert Gustafsson as Young Man
- Weiron Holmberg as Janitor
- Oliver Loftéen as Nisse
- Olof Rhodin as Robinson
- Kristina Törnqvist as Nurse Sara
- Max Vitali as Lelle
- Bojan Westin as Nurse
- Hans Wigren as Nisse's father
- Kim Åström as Nurse's Assistant
- Marie Öhrn as Fritidsfröken
