= Häxan Surtant =

Swedish television character

Häxan Surtant (The Sour-Hag Witch), also called "Världens suraste och elakaste häxa" (The Sulkiest and Meanest Witch in the World), is a Swedish fictional character who appears on SVT. Four TV series about Häxan Surtant have been broadcast and all of them are directed and written by Carl Englén. The narrator (called Pratgubben), who always appears, is Sven Björklund. On 28 August 2009 Häxan Surtant received the Kristallen Award for being "the 2009 best children's TV program".

== Cast ==
- Katrin Sundberg as Häxan Surtant
- Birgitta Andersson as Halvgalna Häxmamman Harriet (Harriet the Half-mad Witch-mother), Häxan Surtant's mother
- Torbjörn Harr as Trollet Trygve (Trygve the Troll), also called "Sveriges Snällaste Sagofigur" ("Sweden's Kindest Fairy Tale Character")
- Gertie Hede as Trollmor (The Troll Mother), Trygve's mother
- Safa Safiyari as Programledartrollet (The TV-host-troll)
- Nora Shtieba as Älvan Ellen (Ellen the Pixie)
- Mats Ågren as Rosenrasande Riddaren Ragnar (Ragnar the Furious Knight)
- Kajsa Reingardt as Fisförnäma Fen Felicia (Felicia the Pompous Fairy)
- Nina Sosunoff as Dansanta Drakdödaren Desiré (Desiré the Dancing Dragon-killer)
- Anna Blomberg as Misstänksamma Monstret Margit (Margit the Suspicious Monster)
- Micke Wranell as Nyvakne Narren Nisse (Nisse the New-woken Jester), a sleepy jester who wakes up when Häxan Surtant meets him
- Åke Lundqvist as Gråtmilde Gråvätten Greger (Greger the Tearful Imp)
- Sten Ericson as Gunnar, Häxmamman Harriet's friend
- Said Chabane as Ali-Baba, Häxmamman Harriet's friend

== About the TV series ==
=== Häxan Surtant ===
This TV series was broadcast in the 2004/2005 Jullovsmorgons Jonas jullov and had six episodes.

Every morning Häxan Surtant stops a young prince going to kindergarten who lives in an apartment near Häxan Surtant's. She asks him what he'll do at kindergarten and in one episode he answers "Spela fotboll" ("Play football"). Then Häxan also wants to play football and goes out to play it, but it doesn't go as she planned and she becomes very angry, so she conjures away everything which is relevant to football.

When the prince comes home from kindergarten he and the princess (his bigger sister) watch the TV program Sagonytt ("Story News") where they inform that something has been conjured away, for example footballs. The boy and his sister know Häxan did it so they tell her to conjure it back and play with them so she understands that playing football can be fun and isn't as bad as she thought.

In the end Häxan always becomes angry anyway; she listens to what the prince and the princess say through the walls:

- (The Prince) "Vad gör man om hon fortsätter vara dum fast man är snäll?" ("What do you do if she continues being mean even if you are kind?")
- (The Princess) "Ja då kan man kalla henne för 'fisrumpa'." ("Yeah, then you can call her 'fart-butt'.")

=== Aktiebolaget Häxan Surtant ===
This TV series was broadcast as Jullovsmorgon 2006/2007 in 15 episodes.

Häxan Surtant has nothing to do. She wants to work but hates co-workers, so she works alone for herself in her newly founded company Aktiebolaget Häxan Surtant (The Häxan Surtant Joint-stock company), without knowing just what the company should do. Every day, she arranges something random for the display window without reason, a pizza box in this case. She then hopes that no one will enter.

Trollet Trygve happens to pass the shop every day and upon seeing the pizza box decides to enter. Trollet Trygve walks up to Häxan and says that he saw a pizza box by the window, so is it maybe possible that this is a pizzeria? Häxan tells him to come back at afternoon to pick up his order. She then goes outside to find someone (Riddaren Ragnar in this episode) who can help her make the pizza. This scenario happens in each episode but with different goods.

In the pizza episode, the pizza was finished long before afternoon, so she ate it while it was warm. Then when she realized that she does not have the pizza for Trollet Trygve as she promised, she became so angry, that she conjured away every pizza in the world. The TV program Sagonytt reporter Älvan Ellen comes to the shop and tells Häxan that if the things have disappeared, she can't do something "bad" with the things. Häxan understands that she must make the things that have disappeared come back. After conjuring back all pizza she then realizes that she must fix pizza before Trollet returns for his order. Depending on the episode, Häxan often goes away to another place to get the thing done. She then returns to her shop just before Trollet Trygve arrives, upon Trygve's arrival he asks Häxan how much it'll cost, which she replies with "12 000 kronor".

==== Additional citations yet to be placed ====
- (Trollmor) "Idiot!" (to Trollet Trygve)
- (Trollet Trygve) "Jutt de' ja." ("That's right")
- (Monstret Margit) "Nu misstänker jag..." ("Now I'm suspecting...")
- (Trollet Trygve) "Hur mycket pengar blir det här då?" ("So how much will this cost?")
- (Trollet Trygve) "12 000 kronor? Det var dyrt." ("12 000 SEK? That was expensive.")
- (Pratgubben) "Det verkar som om Aktiebolaget Häxan Surtant går med vinst." ("It seems that Aktiebolaget Häxan Surtant is making a profit.")

=== Häxan Surtant och den fruktansvärda fritiden ===
This TV series ("The Sour-Hag Witch and The Terrible Playtime") was broadcast first during November 2008–January 2009 and had ten episodes.

Häxan Surtant hasn't paid her apartment for more than 200 years and Gråtmilda Gråvätten Greger, Häxan's landlord, wonders if she'll pay soon. Häxan doesn't want to pay and it's difficult to find a new apartment so she must move back to her mother, Halvgalna Häxmamman Harriet. But she's not so "halvgalen" (half-mad), she is very kind and Häxan hates that she is kind and nice and goes away.

Häxan wants to go to work but can't because it's Sunday and Sundays are work-free days. Then she gets a "play-time-hobby" (for example ceramic in the 2nd program) and goes to Sagofolkets hus ("House of Fairytale People") where Trollet Trygve works as chief and 2 other story-figures are there and have fun with the same hobby as Häxan. But suddenly it doesn't go as Häxan planned and she becomes angry and conjures away everything which has to do with the hobby. When she suddenly doesn't have some hobby, she must go home to her mother who tells her that they said on TV that someone conjured her favourite things, so she can't go out and have fun. Häxan wants to be alone and her mother promises to leave her alone at home if she conjures the things back, so she does it.

After that she sleeps in her mother's sofa until the next Sunday, she finds a new hobby, but becomes unhappy about the hobby because it didn't go as she planned. And when she sleeps, she dreams about "elaka saker man kan göra mot barn" ("mean things one can do to children").

==== Citations ====
- (Häxan Surtant) "Du är ju världens sämsta mamma!" ("You are the worst mother in the world!")
- (Häxmamman Harriet) "Ja, du brukar säga det! Och du är så söt när du blir arg...!" ("Yeah, you always say that! And you are so sweet when you are angry...!")
- (Häxan Surtant) "Nu går jag till jobbet!" ("I'm going to work now!")
- (Pratgubben) "Jobbet...? Men det är ju söndag! Du är ju ledig ju!" ("Work...? But it's Sunday! You are work-free!")
- (Häxan Surtant) "Åååh! Jag hatar söndagar! Ledig är det absolut värsta man kan vara!" ("Oh! I hate Sundays! Work-free is the absolutely worst one can be!")

=== Häxan Surtant och landet Häxania ===
"The Sour-Hag Witch and the country Häxania" was broadcast first during January–March 2012 and had ten episodes.

Häxan Surtant hates nice people on the streets etc. She is so angry that she goes to a forest where she believes she can be alone, but suddenly she finds two princesses and a prince who stop her from coming into their country Kojania where they live in a tree house (koja in Swedish). Then she also wants to start a country where she can be alone. She buys Gråtmilda Gråvätten Greger's holiday village and pays only a banana and forces away Greger and calls the new country Häxania.

But suddenly she isn't alone, she is together with Riddaren Ragnar, Fen Felicia, Trollet Trygve and Trollmor who are on holiday in the "former" holiday village. Riddaren Ragnar says that they may stay in Häxania because they are citizens and citizens can't be forced away. But Häxan has an own house where she lives alone and sulk.

The next day Häxan becomes angry when she wakes up and sees something "nice" so she angrily goes to the forest. She meets the children in Kojania who say that they are doing something and then Häxan goes back to Häxania and says that the citizens of Häxania should do it too.

In the final episode, Greger gets his holiday village back, but Trollet Trygve thinks it's "expensive", because Häxan Surtant says that "it costs 12,000 SEK". In the final program Kojania is also cancelled; the children say that they miss their home and are "trötta på att leka land" ("tired of playing country").

==== Citations ====
- (Häxan Surtant) "Nu går jag till skogs!" ("I'm going to the forest now!")
- (Häxan Surtant) "Pratgubbe, vad är...?" ("Narrator, what is...?")
- (Pratgubben) "Vet inte du det?" ("Don't you know that?")
- (Häxan Surtant) "Jo. Jag ville bara kolla om DU vet det. Det vore ju förfärligt om du berättade en saga som du inte förstår." ("Oh yes I do. I just wanted to check if YOU know, because it would've been terrible if you had been telling a story you don't understand.")
- (Trollmor) "Idiot!" (to Trollet Trygve)
