= Risberg =

Risberg is a Swedish surname, which means "shrub mountain" or "shrub hill", from the Swedish terms ris ("shrub" or "brushwood") and berg ("mountain" or "hill"). Notable people with the surname include:

- Adam Risberg, Swedish drag queen
- Annica Risberg (born 1941), Swedish actress and singer
- Emilie Risberg (1815–1890), Swedish educator
- Jan Risberg (born 1953), Swedish conductor
- Lennart Risberg (1935–2013), Swedish boxer
- Swede Risberg (1894–1975), American baseball player
