= Kristiansand International Children's Film Festival =

Kristiansand International Children's Film Festival is an organised, extended presentation of international children's films in one or more movie theaters or screening venues, usually in a single locality. It is located in Kristiansand, Norway.

== Selected releases ==
- The Sword in the Stone (May 3, 2000)
- The Great Mouse Detective (May 3, 2000)
- The Jungle Book (May 4, 2000)
- Winnie the Pooh and Tigger Too! (May 4, 2000)
- Fantasia 2000 (May 4, 2000)
- The Aristocats (May 2, 2001)
- Lady and the Tramp II: Scamp's Adventure (May 3, 2001)
- Lady and the Tramp (April 30, 2002)
- Snow White and the Seven Dwarfs (May 1, 2002)
- Dumbo (May 1, 2002)
- One Hundred and One Dalmatians (May 1, 2002)
- Pippi on the Run (May 1, 2002)
- Tom and Jerry: The Magic Ring (May 1, 2002)
- Alice in Wonderland (May 4, 2002)
- Don't Cry Wolf (April 29, 2003)
- Pippi in the South Seas (April 29, 2003)
- Hercules (May 3, 2003)
- Looney Tunes: Back in Action (April 27, 2004)
- Winnie the Pooh: Springtime with Roo (April 29, 2004)
- The Cat Came Back (April 30, 2004)
