= Bojan Westin =

Swedish actress (1926–2013)

- Born: Bojan Viola Westin; 5 September 1926; Njutånger, Sweden
- Died: 4 October 2013 (aged 87); Stockholm, Sweden
- Occupation: Actress
- Years active: 1941–2010

Bojan Viola Westin (5 September 1926 – 4 October 2013) was a Swedish actress. She appeared in more than 30 films and television shows between 1941 and 2010.

Bojan Viola Westin was born on 5 September 1926 in Njutånger. She moved to Stockholm as a teenager, where she attended Calle Flygare's Theater School.

== Selected filmography ==
- The Talk of the Town (1941)
- The Ghost Reporter (1941)
- Tired Theodore (1945)
- Kristin Commands (1946)
- Jens Mansson in America (1947)
- Underground Secrets (1991)
- Drowning Ghost (2004)
- Sökarna: Återkomsten (2006)
