= Don't Cry Wolf (film) =

- Directed by: Clas Lindberg
- Written by: David Berron; Anders Lennberg; Clas Lindberg; Urban Nordgård
- Produced by: Roland Johansson; Castro Khatib; Karl Penser
- Cinematography: John Haag-Rosenlund
- Edited by: Clas Lindberg
- Music by: Thomas Lindahl
- Release date: 4 April 2003
- Running time: 94 minutes
- Country: Sweden
- Language: Swedish

Don't Cry Wolf (Swedish: Lillebror på tjuvjakt) is a 2003 Swedish comedy film directed by Clas Lindberg. Lindberg won the Audience Award at the 2003 Kristiansand International Children's Film Festival for the film.

== Cast ==
- Kjell Bergqvist as Roland Ström, Lillebror's father
- Daniel Bragderyd as Lillebror
- Helena Korsvall as Alex, Lillebror's sister
- Inga Ålenius as Märta, Lillebror's grandmother
- David Schlein-Andersen as Jens
- Karin Bjurström as Veronika, Jens's mother
- Rikard Svensson as Slim, thief
- Ivan Mathias Petersson as Frank, thief
- Conny Andersson as Peter, thief
- Willy Karlsson as Granit
- Svante Grundberg as Guard at the museum
- Gösta Hurtig-Möller as Guard at the museum
- Putte Elgh as Guard at the museum
- Lennart Gustavsson as Chief at the museum
- Helen Vedle as Cashier at the museum
