= Kan du vissla Johanna? (film) =

- Based on: Kan du vissla Johanna? by Ulf Stark
- Written by: Ulf Stark
- Directed by: Rumle Hammerich
- Starring: Tobias Swärd; Jimmy Sandin; Per Oscarsson
- Composer: Jacob Groth
- Country of origin: Sweden
- Original language: Swedish

Production
- Producer: Agneta Jansson
- Cinematography: Andra Lasmanis
- Running time: 55 minutes
- Production company: Sveriges Television

Original release
- Network: Kanal 1
- Release: 24 December 1994

Kan du vissla Johanna? ("Can You Whistle Johanna?") is a Swedish TV film which originally aired on Sveriges Television on 24 December 1994, based on the screenwriter Ulf Stark's 1992 book of the same name. Since 1994 it has been traditionally broadcast every Christmas Eve in Sweden.

The title comes from a 1932 song with the same name by Åke Söderblom and Sten Axelson.

== Plot ==
The film takes place during the 1950s. Berra, a 7-year-old boy, wishes for a grandfather who he can love, who can invite him for coffee and who can teach him how to whistle. His friend Ulf tells him that he can look at the retirement home, where he finds an old man called Nils who becomes Berra's stepgrandfather.

== Cast ==
- Tobias Swärd as Berra (Bertil)
- Jimmy Sandin as Ulf
- Per Oscarsson as Nils
- Helena Kallenbäck as Tora, woman working at the retirement home
- Thomas Roos as Mr Gustavsson
- Gunilla Abrahamsson as teacher
- Gustav Levin as Priest
- Mats Bergman as Tobacco merchant
