= Zara Backman =

Swedish actress

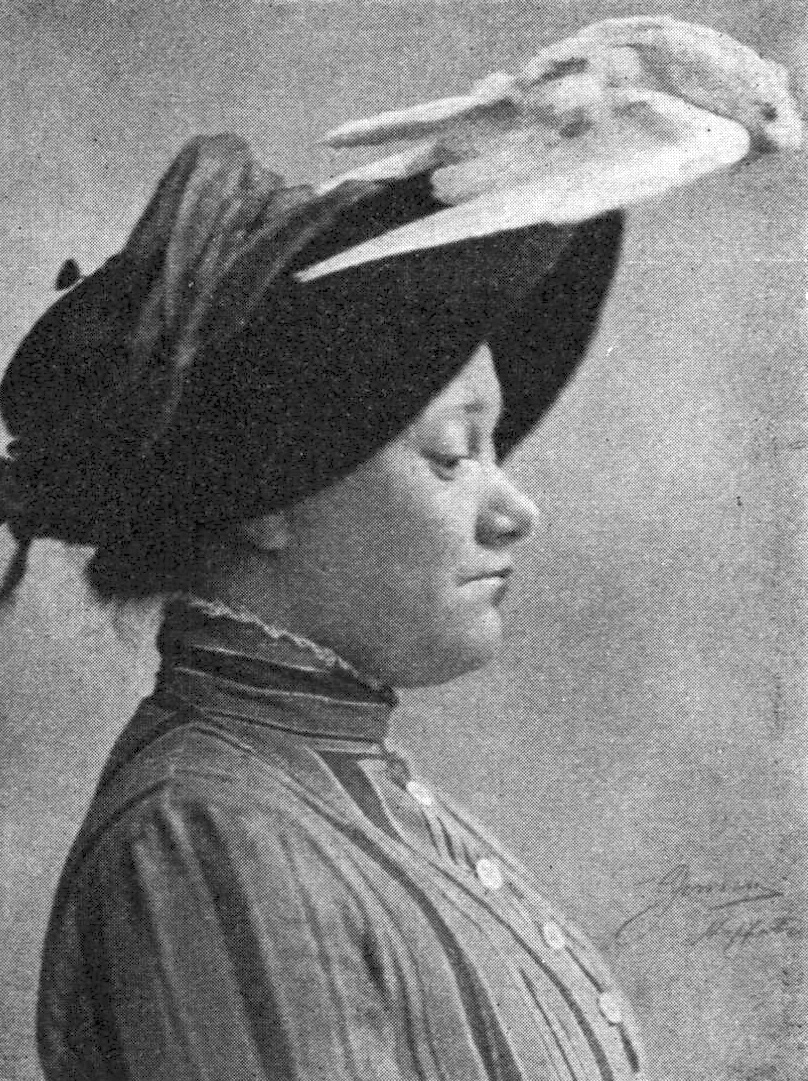
- Backman in 1910
- Born: Anna Zara Backman; 27 October 1875
- Died: 13 September 1949 (aged 73)

Anna Zara Backman (27 October 1875 – 13 September 1949 in Gothenburg) was a Swedish actress.

== Filmography ==
- 1915 – I kronans kläder
- 1916 – Svärmor på vift eller Förbjudna vägar
- 1916 – Bengts nya kärlek eller Var är barnet?
- 1930 – Lyckobreven
- 1938 – Du gamla du fria
