= Njutånger =

- Location within Sweden Gävleborg Location within Sweden
- Coordinates: 61°37′N 17°03′E
- Country: Sweden
- Province: Hälsingland
- County: Gävleborg County
- Municipality: Hudiksvall Municipality

Area
  - Total: 1.71 km^{2} (0.66 sq mi)

Population (31 December 2023)
  - Total: 806
  - Density: 472/km^{2} (1,220/sq mi)
- Time zone: UTC+1 (CET)
  - Summer (DST): UTC+2 (CEST)

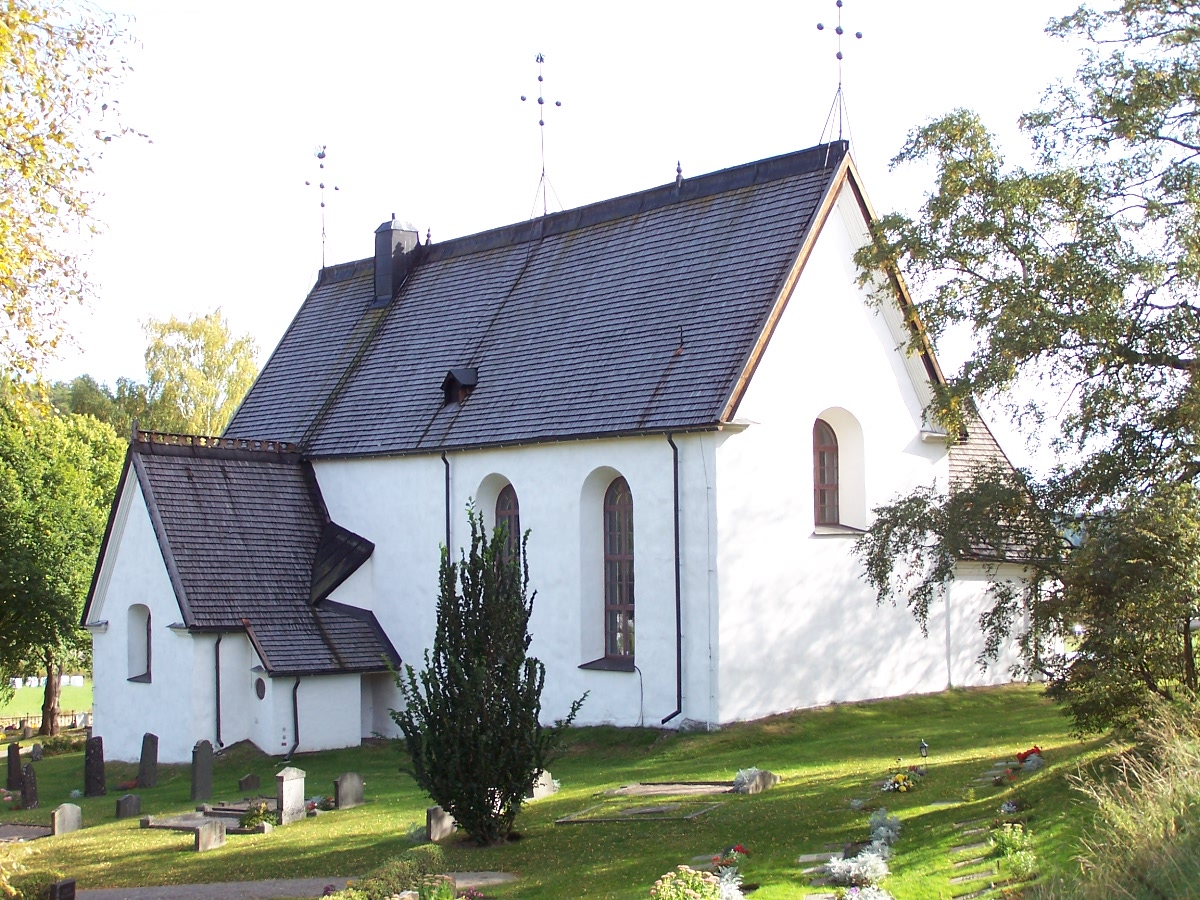
Njutånger church, Sweden

Njutånger is a locality situated in Hudiksvall Municipality, Gävleborg County, Sweden with 806 inhabitants in 2023.
