= Bengt Dalqvist =

Swedish actor, dancer and singer (born 1975)

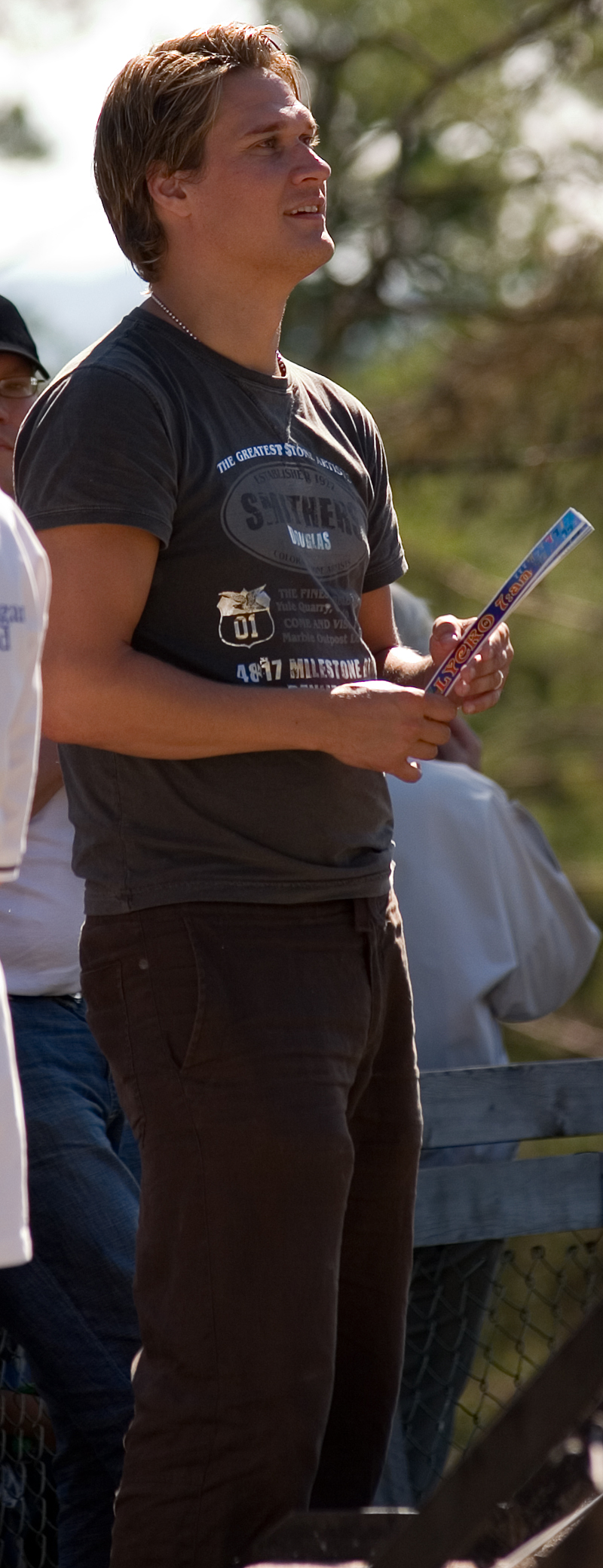
- Dalqvist in 2006
- Born: Bengt Albin Gösta Dalqvist; 28 March 1975 (age 51); Enköping, Sweden
- Occupations: Actor; dancer; singer
- Years active: 1996–present
- Spouse(s): Nette Dalqvist; 2 children

Bengt Albin Gösta Dalqvist (born 28 March 1975), also known as Dahlqvist, is a Swedish actor, dancer and singer.

== Career ==
He acted in over 500 episodes of the TV4 series Skilda världar, as the character Daniel Toivonen. He has also had a role in the musical West Side Story. Along with Eva Rydberg, he acted in the farce Arnbergs korsettfabrik at Intiman in 2001. He has also been a singer in the band The Odd Dogs. He auditioned for Idol 2009 on TV4, but was eliminated.

== Personal life ==
Dalqvist is married to his wife, Nette Dalqvist (née Lövkvist). Together, they live in Södermalm, Stockholm and have two children.

== Filmography ==
=== Film ===
- Stigma (2000) – Mikael
- Skönheten (2002) – The boy
- Onyx (2003) – Niklas

=== Television ===
- Sexton (1996) – Håkan
- Skilda världar (1996–2002) – Daniel Toivonen
- På rymmen (1999) – "Spårhund"
- Nya lögner (1999) – Daniel Toivonen
