= Åke Lundqvist =

Swedish actor (1936–2021)

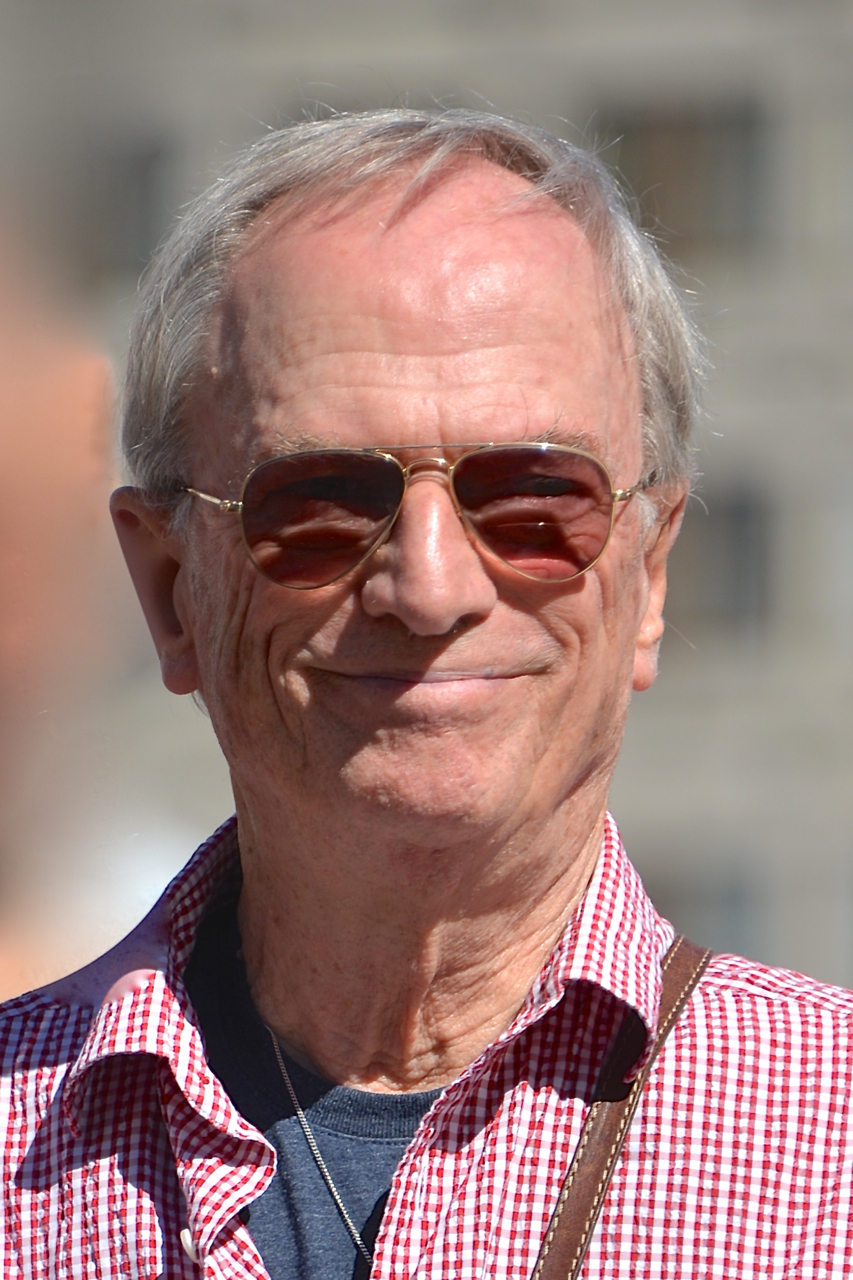
- Åke Lundqvist in August 2013
- Born: 9 June 1936; Gävle Parish
- Died: 4 August 2021 (aged 85)

Åke Bertil Lundqvist (9 June 1936 – 4 August 2021) was a Swedish actor.

Lundqvist began his acting career in 1973, when he played a role as the bookkeeper Schröder in Selma Lagerlöf's Gösta Berlings saga.

== Filmography ==
- 2009 – Ångrarna
- 2008/2009 & 2012 - Häxan Surtant
- 2001 – Röd jul
- 2000 - The Mind's Eye (novel)
- Jakten på en mördare (1999)
- Beck – Mannen med ikonerna (1997) (TV-film)
- 1972 – Ture Sventon, privatdetektiv
