= Daniel Bragderyd =

Swedish actor

Nils Daniel Bragderyd (born 15 March 1991) is a Swedish actor.

== Filmography ==
- Percy, Buffalo Bill och jag (2005)
- Don't Cry Wolf (2003)
- Pappa polis (2002)
- Hjälp! Rånare! (2002)
