= Katrin Sundberg =

Swedish actress, dancer and choreographer

- Born: 8 October 1962 (age 63); Örebro, Sweden
- Occupations: actress, dancer, choreographer
- Father: Björn Sundberg

Katrin Sundberg (real name: Eva Cathrine Sundberg, born 8 October 1962 in Örebro) is a Swedish actress, dancer and choreographer.

As actress, Sundberg is well known as her title role in the Sveriges Television series Häxan Surtant. She also played Uni Sax in the 2009 "julkalendern" Superhjältejul. She has appeared in the entertainment program Gäster med gester.
