= Oliver Loftéen =

Swedish actor (1979–2021)

Oliver Loftéen (12 April 1979 – 30 August 2021) was a Swedish actor. Loftéen starred in several classic Swedish drama and comedy movies.

Loftéen was diagnosed with Asperger syndrome shortly before his death.

== Selected filmography ==
- Underjordens hemlighet (The Underground Secret)
- Bert - Den sista oskulden (Bert - The Last Virgin)
- Tic Tac
- Vägen ut (The Way Out)
- Pusselbitar (Pieces Of A Puzzle)
- Sex, hopp och kärlek (Sex, Hope And Love)
