= Ulf Eklund =

Swedish actor

- Born: 23 April 1951 (age 75); Stockholm, Sweden
- Occupation: Actor
- Years active: 1980–present

Ulf Eklund (born 23 April 1951) is a Swedish actor. He has appeared in more than 25 films and television shows since 1980.

== Biography ==
Eklund grew up in Bagarmossen and Näsbypark. From school age he began doing revues and theatre, though at that time he was more active behind the scenes as a technician and in similar roles. He appeared as an actor in Bengt Ahlfors' play Kropp (Body), with which he toured schools. When the others in the group applied to the National Academy of Dramatic Art (Scenskolan), he did the same and was admitted in Stockholm in 1973, graduating in 1976.

== Filmography ==
- Lycka till (1980)
- Öbergs på Lillöga (1983)
- Äntligen! (1984)
- Uppdraget (1985)
- Sammansvärjningen (1986)
- Goda grannar (1987)
- Stoft och skugga (1988)
- All Dogs Go to Heaven (1989) (Swedish voice)
- Rock*a*Doodle (1991)
- Underground Secrets (1991)
- Den ofrivillige golfaren (1991)
- T. Sventon och fallet Isabella (1991)
- Portis klarar skivan (1991)
- Zorn (1994)
- The Indian in the Cupboard (1995) (Swedish voice)
- Du bestämmer (1995)
- Sjukan (1995)
- Beck – Spår i mörker (1997)
- Pip-Larssons (1998)
- Ivar Kreuger (1998)
- C/o Segemyhr (1998)
- S:t Mikael: Traumaenheten (1998–1999)
- Rederiet (1999)
- Reuter & Skoog (1999)
- Goda grannar (1987–1988)
- Skilda världar (2000)
- Nödig (2001)
- Rederiet (1992–2002)
- Kommissionen (2005)
- Lovisa och Carl Michael (2005)
- Inga tårar (2006)
- Wallander – Skulden (2009)
- The Hypnotist (2012)
- Inside Out (2015)
- Maria Wern - De döda tiger (2016)

== Theater ==
- Mother Courage and Her Children (Mutter Courage und ihre Kinder) (1987)
- The Land Without Borders (Das weite Land) (1992)
- 900 Oneonta Street (900 Oneonta) (1996)
- Fiddler on the Roof Jerry Bock , Sheldon Harnick and Joseph Stein
