= Kajsa Reingardt =

Swedish actress

Kajsa Louise Reingardt (born 22 June 1957, Malmö, Sweden) is a Swedish actress.

Reingardt studied at Malmö Theatre Academy 1977–80 and worked after the education at Malmö City Theatre but also at Borås City Theatre. Since 1992 she works at Stockholm City Theatre.

== Selected filmography ==
- 2008 - Oskyldigt dömd (TV)
- 2007–2010 - Hotell Kantarell (TV)
- 2006–present - Häxan Surtant (TV)
- 2005 - Van Veeteren – Carambole
- 1998 - Beck – Öga för öga
- 1989 - Fallgropen
- 1986 - Skånska mord (TV)
- 1979 - Våning för 4 (TV)
