= Tobias Swärd =

Swedish actor (born 1986)

Tobias Swärd (born Tobias Oscar Robert Svärd, 8 October 1986 in Eskilstuna) is a Swedish actor known for his role as Berra in Kan du vissla Johanna?
