= Inga Ålenius =

Swedish actress (1938–2017)

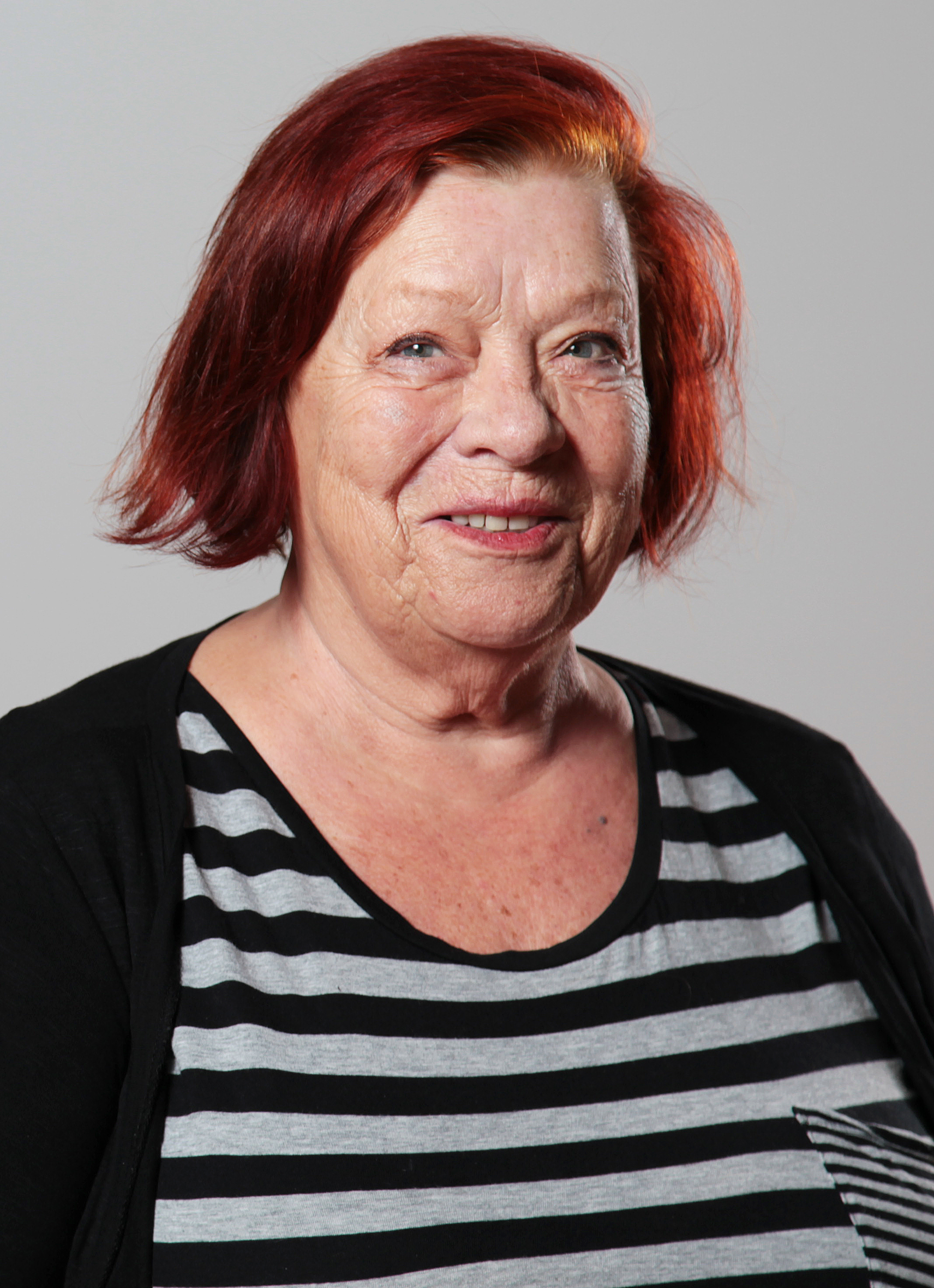
- Ålenius 2012
- Born: 15 May 1938; Stockholm, Sweden
- Died: 23 April 2017 (aged 78); Sweden
- Occupation: Actress
- Known for: Role of Lisen in Fanny and Alexander

Inga Maria Ålenius (15 May 1938 – 23 April 2017) was a Swedish actress. She is best known for her role as "Lisen" in Ingmar Bergman's film Fanny and Alexander.

== Early life and career ==
Ålenius was born on 15 May 1938 in Stockholm, and educated at the City Theater's drama school in Norrköping. She worked at the County Theater in Västerås, People's Theater in Gothenburg, and the National Theater. Her first film credit was the 1968 film Under ditt parasoll, starring the pop/rock group Sven-Ingvars.

Besides working in Bergman's 1982 film Fanny and Alexander. She also worked in television, playing the role of "Astrid" on Hem till byn, Sweden's longest running TV series, for 30 years. Ålenius had starred alongside actor Nils Poppe in several roles during the early 1990s.

== Later years and death ==
After turning 70, Ålenius moved to the town of Helsingborg. Her last role was in the play I Sista Minuten. Ålenius died following a brief illness in 2017, aged 78.

== Filmography ==
- 1968: Under ditt parasoll - Kristina från Vilhelmina
- 1971-2006: Hem till byn (TV Series) - Astrid Ljung
- 1976: Raskens (TV Mini-Series) - Maid
- 1979: Den nya människan - Personal på ungdomshemmet
- 1980: Mor gifter sig (TV Mini-Series) - Sockersirupen
- 1981: Sista budet - Rosita
- 1982: Fanny and Alexander - Lisen - Ekdahlska huset
- 1988: Polisen som vägrade ta semester (TV Mini-Series) - Agata Gärdin
- 1991: The Best Intentions (TV Mini-Series) - Alva Nykvist
- 1992: The Best Intentions - Alva Nykvist
- 1996: Rusar i hans famn - Lady in the Shop
- 1996: Skilda världar (TV Series) - Dagmar Larsson
- 1996: Att stjäla en tjuv - Mrs. Fahlström
- 1998: Beck – Pensionat Pärlan (TV Series) - Kvinnliga grannen
- 1999: In Bed with Santa - Signe
- 2000: The New Country (TV Movie) - Gumman
- 2001: Woman with Birthmark (TV Mini-Series) - Helena Wagner
- 2001: Kommissarie Winter (TV Series) - Louises mamma
- 2002: Pappa polis (TV Mini-Series) - Mormor
- 2003: Lillebror på tjuvjakt - Märta
- 2003: Capricciosa - Margit
- 2004: Masjävlar - Anna
