= Ivan Mathias Petersson =

Actor, director and screenwriter

Ivan Mathias Gunnar Petersson (born 5 October 1971) is a Swedish actor, film director, author and screenwriter born in Spånga, Stockholm Municipality. His father is actor Bo-Ivan Petersson.

== Selected filmography ==
- 1995 – Nattens barn (TV)
- 1997 – 9 millimeter
- 1999 - C/O Segemyhr (TV series(S03E10 Konnässören))
- 2000 – Dykaren
- 2001 – Pusselbitar (TV)
- 2001 – Rendezvous (also screenwriter and director)
- 2002 – Hjälp! Rånare! (TV)
- 2002 – Tusenbröder (TV)
- 2003 – Lillebror på tjuvjakt
- 2005 – Den utvalde
- 2006 – Mäklarna (TV)
- 2006 – Möbelhandlarens dotter (TV)
- 2006 – Tjocktjuven
- 2007 – Järnets änglar
- 2007 – Leende guldbruna ögon (TV)
- 2007 – Beck – Det tysta skriket
- 2008 – Maria Wern – Främmande fågel (TV)
- 2009 – Wallander – Skytten
- 2019 – Treadstone
- 2022–2023 – Jack Ryan (TV)

== Bibliography ==
- 2000 – Mataffärens hemlighet
