= Frida Abrahamsson =

Swedish footballer (born 1994)

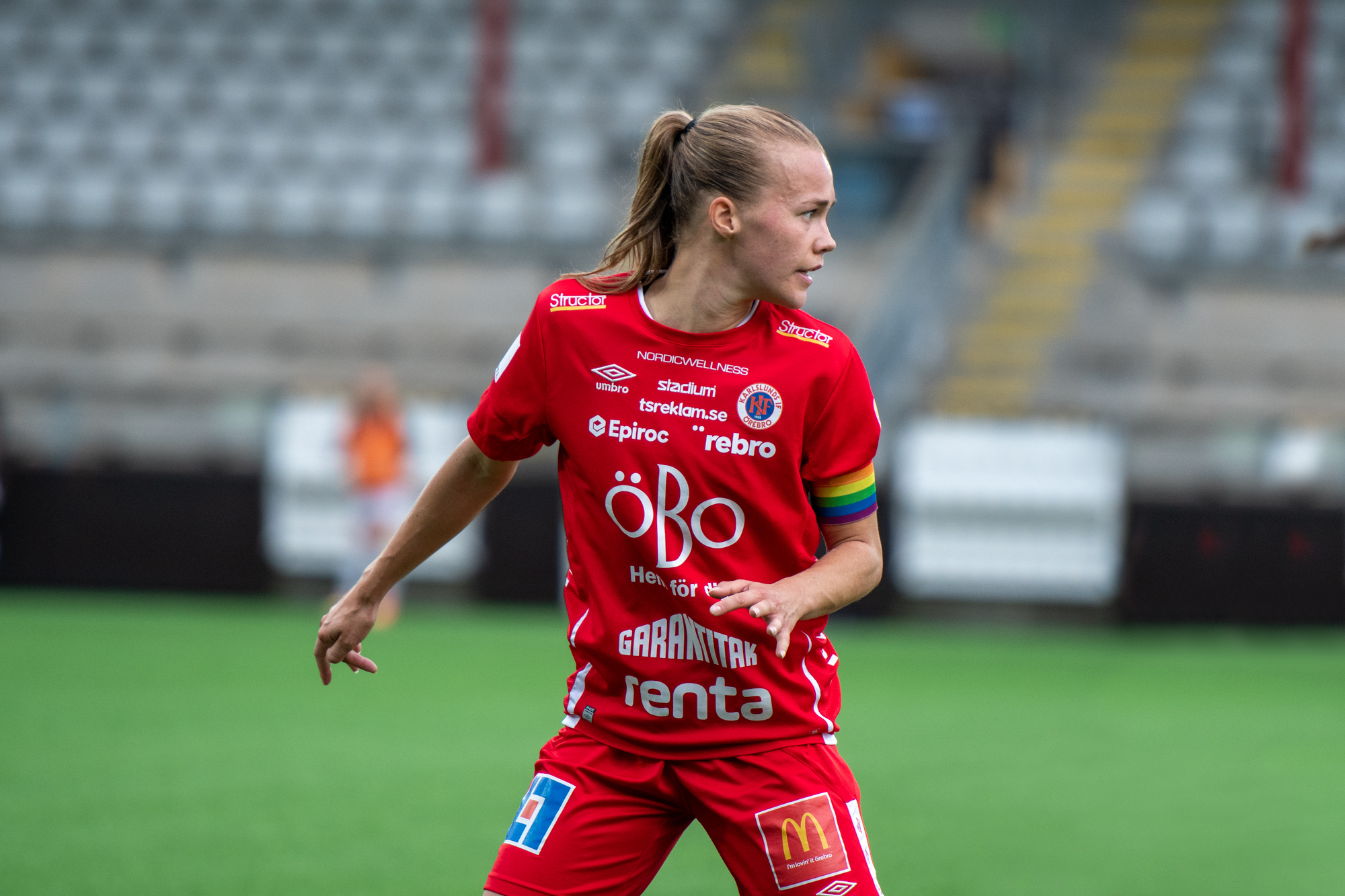

Personal information
- Full name: Frida Abrahamsson
- Date of birth: 14 September 1994 (age 32)
- Height: 1.71 m (5 ft 7 in)
- Position: Defender

Team information
- Current team: KIF Orebro
- Number: 4

Senior career*
Years	Team	Apps	(Gls)
2014–2017	Piteå IF	23	(0)
2015–2016	→ Sunnanå SK (loan)	10	(0)
2018–	KIF Orebro	64	(3)
- * Club domestic league appearances and goals as of 3 November 2020

Frida Abrahamsson (born 14 September 1994) is a Swedish football defender currently playing for KIF Orebro in the Damallsvenskan.
