= Ester Textorius =

Swedish actress (1883–1972)

Ester V. Textorius
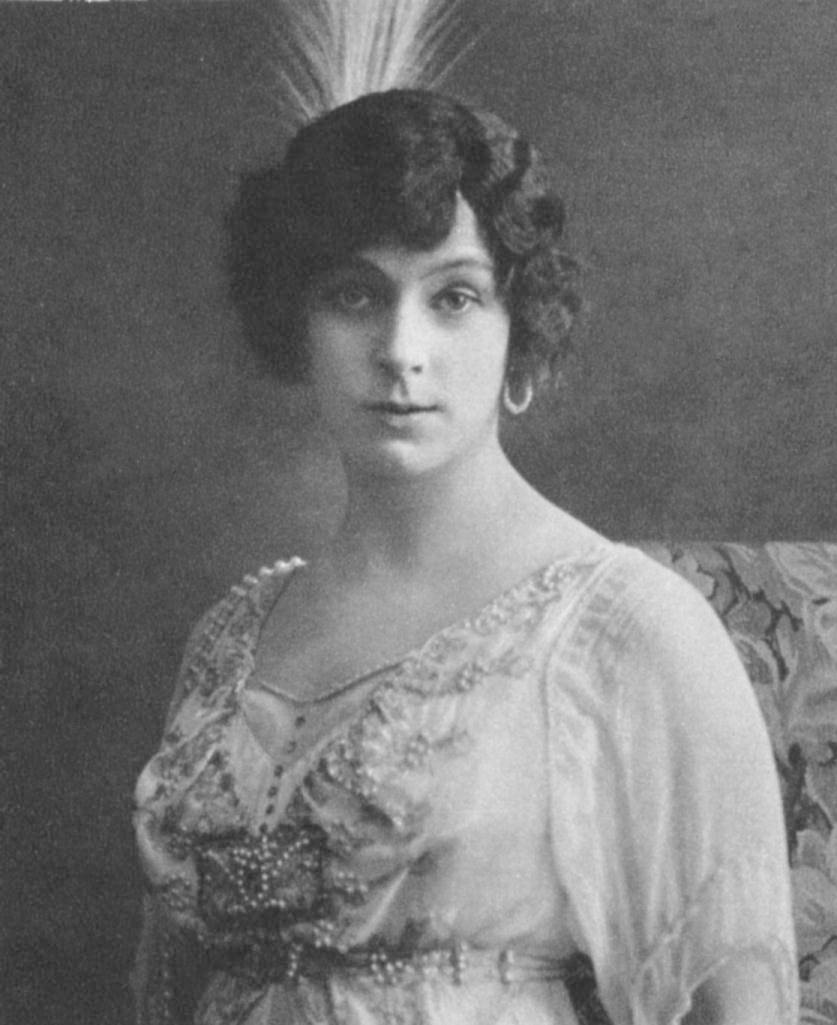
- Ester Textorius, c. 1912
- Born: 22 August 1883; Västerås, Sweden
- Died: 13 February 1972 (aged 88); Stockholm, Sweden
- Occupations: Actress and singer

Ester Vilhelmina Textorius (née Pettersson; 22 August 1883 – 13 February 1972) was a Swedish actress and opera singer, known for her comedic theater roles.

== Early life and marriage ==
Ester Vilhelmina Pettersson was born in Västerås, Sweden, on 22 August 1883. In 1904 she married the actor Oskar Textorius (1864–1938).

== Career ==
Textorius started her acting career by answering an advertisement by theater leader Emil Hillberg, and made her stage debut in 1901 at Halmstad theater in Halmstad as Paula in the play Fri vilja. After studies with Hillberg and actress Josefina Gullberg, she worked for a few years at different theaters in the countryside. It was during these years that she had the opportunity to work with the famous the Royal Dramatic Theatre actor J. Gustaf Fredrikson (1832–1921). Her favorite part during these years was as Käthe in the play Gamla Heidelberg. At about this same time she also met her future husband.

=== Stockholm debut ===
In 1907, Textorius made her Stockholm debut in a farce at Djurgårdsteatern and also recorded three records for Lycrophon with recorded operetten. In 1909 and 1910 she worked with Anton Salmson at the newly opened Operett-teatern at Östermalm in Stockholm. And from 1911 to 1918 she worked at Vasateatern. During these years she did a lot of operetten; even though successful, she never considered herself a good enough singer for such roles and later preferred speaking roles. She also played in a revue.

In 1911, the couple made their joint film debut in Anna Hofman-Uddgren's short film Stockholmsfrestelser. Textorius, however, never become an established actress and participated only in a handful of films, mostly comedic roles in the 1940s. By 1912 she had done some recordings for the label Odeon.

Between 1919 and 1925, the Textorius duo worked in Gothenburg, Ester mostly at Folkteatern, but they returned to Stockholm where her husband obtained a job as a director at Oscarsteatern and Vasateatern. Ester worked with the administration at the same time.

In 1939, Textorius became a widow and had her final stage performance in Pauline Brunius's play Kvinnorna at the Royal Dramatic Theatre.

== Death and legacy ==
Textorius died on 13 February 1972 in Stockholm, at the age of 88.

== Filmography ==
- 1911: Stockholmsfrestelser
- 1925: Damen med kameliorna
- 1941: Lärarinna på vift
- 1942: Sexlingar
- 1943: Stora skrällen
