= Oskar Textorius =

Swedish actor, singer and theater director (1864–1938)

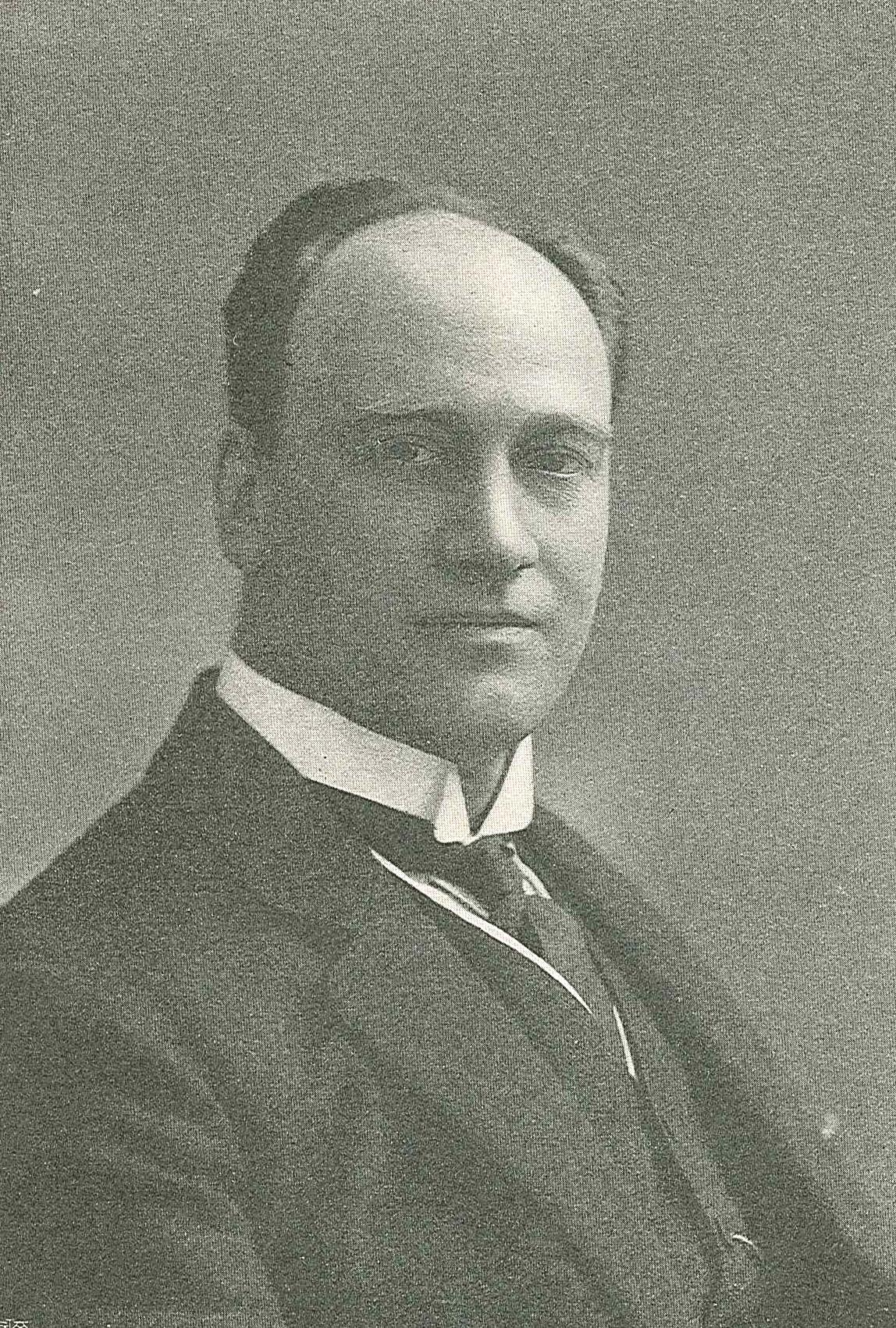
- Occupations: Actor, theater manager
- Spouse: Georgina Sondell
- Children: Elsa Textorius

Bror Oskar Textorius (8 April 1864 in Kristianstad – 20 April 1938 in Stockholm) was a Swedish actor, singer and theater director. Textorius made his stage debut in 1887 and participated in different theater groups before getting a job at Folkteatern in Stockholm in 1893. He started his own operetta group which toured between 1899 and 1906, after that he worked in theater in Stockholm and between 1911 and 1918 he became the most noted operetta actor at Oscarsteatern. He worked at Scalateatern in Copenhagen, Denmark between 1918 and 1920 and worked as a stage leader at Stora Teatern in Gothenburg between 1920 and 1925, and later from 1937 and until his death.

Textorius made his film debut in 1911, in Anna Hofman-Uddgren's short film Stockholmsfrestelser along with his wife Ester Textorius, he would feature in six films. He made his music debut in 1907 by recording operettes and made about 100 recordings.

He was married three times, the first time to actress Georgina Sondell with whom he had his daughter Elsa Textorius, the second marriage was with actress Svea Textorius between 1900 and 1904, and the last time was with actress Ester Textorius from 1904 and until his death.

== Filmography ==
- 1911 – Stockholmsfrestelser
- 1913 – Filmdrottningen
- 1925 – Hennes lilla majestät
- 1926 – Fänrik Ståls sägner-del I
- 1931 – Farornas paradis
- 1932 – Ett skepp kommer lastat
