= Gunilla Abrahamsson =

Swedish actress (born 1945)

Gunilla Elisabet Abrahamsson (born 22 June 1945 in Norrköping) is a Swedish actress. She studied at Gothenburg Theatre Academy.

== Selected filmography ==
- 1994 – Rederiet (TV)
- 1994 – Kan du vissla Johanna? (TV film)
- 1998 – Beck – Monstret
- 1998 – Skärgårdsdoktorn (TV)
- 1999 – Vägen ut
- 2001 – Kaspar i Nudådalen (TV, Julkalendern)
- 2001 – Om inte
- 2002 – Stackars Tom (TV)
- 2002 – Stora teatern (TV)
- 2003 – En ö i havet (TV)
- 2004 – Om Stig Petrés hemlighet (TV)
- 2005 – 27 sekundmeter, snö (TV film)
