= Annica Risberg =

Swedish actress and singer

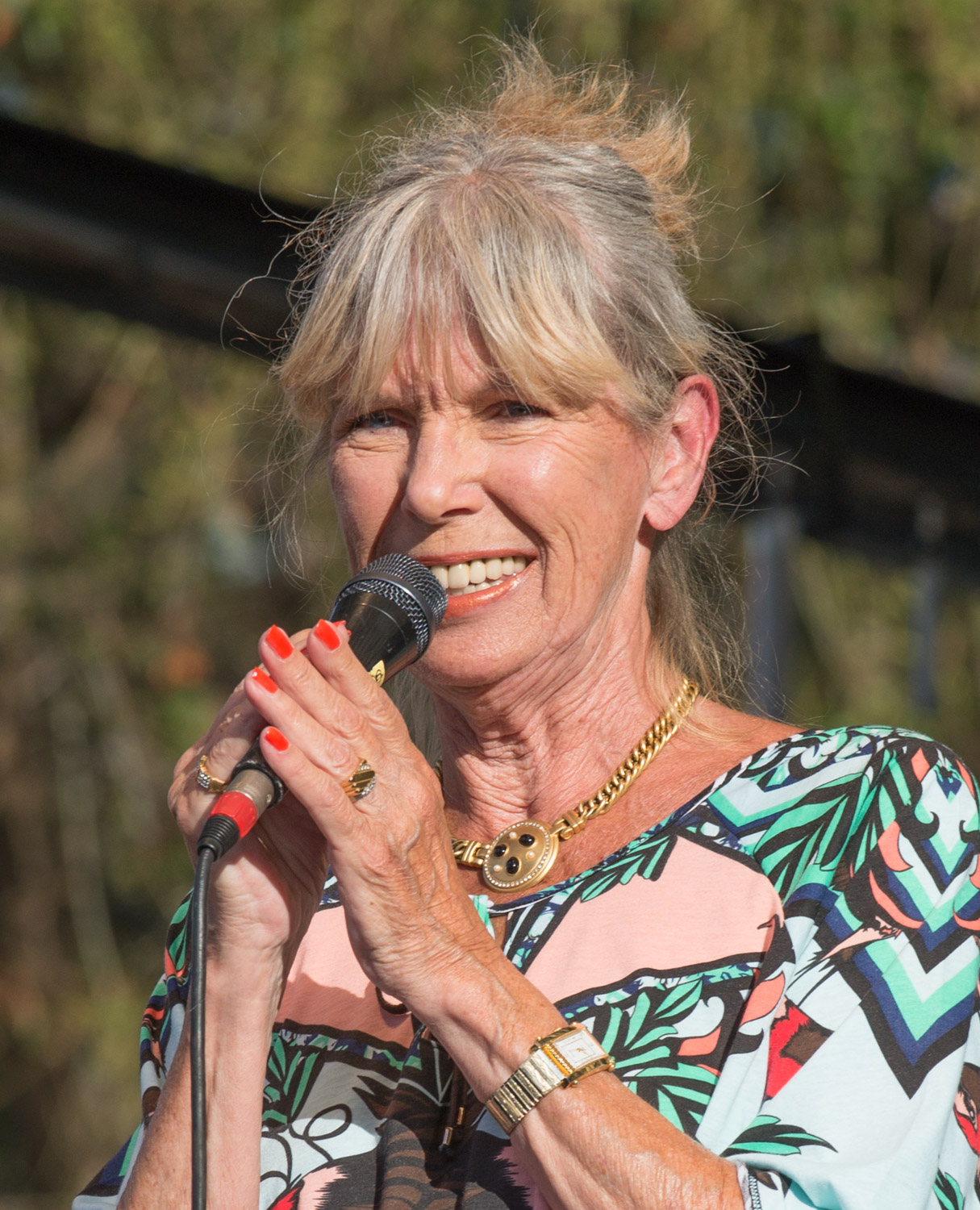
Annica Risberg in 2015

Annica Risberg (born 27 March 1941) is a Swedish actress and singer.

Annica Risberg was born Annika Margareta Risberg in Engelbrekt Parish in Stockholm. Her parents were the accordionist Thore Risberg and Ella Margareta, née Lennbom. When she was 16, she came second in an Aftontidningen talent show, and in 1963 she was in the production of Stop the World – I Want to Get Off at the Scala in Stockholm.

In the 1970s she was one of the busiest backup singers in Sweden, both live and in recordings. She often worked in the group Dolls with Kerstin Dahl and Kerstin Bagge, and also made a number of her own recordings. In 1975 her song "Sommaren med dig" was a hit. She was a programme host at Skansen and worked for the Swedish Defence Forces field artists programme.

She worked with Yngve Stoor on a number of recordings and in 2004 released a recording with Christer Eidebo; others she has worked with include Olle Widestrand, Lars Ek and Sten-Åke Cederhök.

She has been married twice, to Leif Malm from 1964 to 1975 (when she was sometimes known as Annica Malm) and to Bengt Meder from 1989 to 1990. Her children Eva Malm (born 1965) and Fredrik Malm (born 1968) collaborated with her on a recording of children's songs released in 1977, Smått å gott – 26 barnvisor.

== Filmography ==
- 1976: Agaton Sax och Byköpings gästabud
- 1978: Min lilla åsna (Swedish dub of The Small One)
- 1981: Sopor
- 1983: Katy
