= Wallander: Mastermind =

2005 film by Peter Flinth

Wallander – Mastermind
- Directed by: Peter Flinth
- Written by: Stefan Ahnhem
- Produced by: Ole Søndberg; Lars Björkman
- Starring: Krister Henriksson; Johanna Sällström; Ola Rapace
- Release date: 16 December 2005
- Running time: 102 minutes
- Country: Sweden
- Language: Swedish

Wallander - Mastermind is a 2005 film about the Swedish police detective Kurt Wallander directed by Peter Flinth.

Wallander's team deals with a series of false alarms—until it becomes apparent that there is more to these seemingly harmless cases than meets the eye. Soon, the entire department is on the trail of someone who is clearly pulling everyone's strings, and it is up to them to identify the mastermind behind these schemes before it is too late.

== Cast ==
- Krister Henriksson as Kurt Wallander
- Johanna Sällström as Linda Wallander
- Ola Rapace as Stefan Lindman
- Angela Kovacs as Ann-Britt
- Fredrik Gunnarsson as Svartman
- Douglas Johansson as Martinsson
- Mats Bergman as Nyberg
- Michael Nyqvist as Lothar Kraftzcyk
- Sally Carlsson as Therese
- Suzanna Dilber as Jolanta
- Marianne Mörck as Ebba
- Frederic Täckström as a policeman in Malmö
- Göran Aronsson as Grönkvist
- Lisa Lindgren as Elisabeth Martinsson
- Stina Ekblad as the dissector
- Jan Skott as Ragnar Öberg
