= Wallander: Innan frosten =

2005 Swedish police drama film

Wallander – Innan frosten
- Directed by: Kjell-Åke Andersson
- Written by: Pelle Berglund; Stefan Ahnhem
- Based on: Before the Frost by Henning Mankell
- Produced by: Ole Søndberg; Lars Björkman
- Starring: Krister Henriksson; Johanna Sällström; Ola Rapace
- Release date: 14 January 2005
- Country: Sweden
- Language: Swedish

Wallander – Innan frosten is a 2005 Swedish drama film about the fictional police detective Kurt Wallander, directed by Kjell-Åke Andersson. It is based on the 2002 novel of the same name, by Henning Mankell.

== Synopsis ==
Linda Wallander graduates from police academy in Stockholm, whereupon, she moves back to Ystad, where her father, Kurt Wallander, lives and works as a police officer. Kurt thinks that his daughter's graduation is the day after the actual day, giving him a nasty surprise when she turns up unexpectedly, equally unhappy to see him. Together, they investigate Linda's first case, the disappearance of an elderly lady, Birgitta Medberg.

== Cast ==
- Krister Henriksson as Kurt Wallander
- Johanna Sällström as Linda Wallander
- Ola Rapace as Stefan Lindman
- Ellen Mattsson as Anna Westin
- Niklas Falk as Erik Westin
- Angela Kovacs as Ann-Britt Höglund
- Douglas Johansson as Martinsson
- Mats Bergman as Nyberg
- Fredrik Gunnarsson as Svartman
- Chatarina Larsson as Lisa Holgersson
- Jens Hultén as Torgeir
- Karin Bertling as Birgitta Medberg
- Malena Engström as Myran
- Maria Arnadottir as Malin Krantz
- Marianne Mörck as Ebba
