= Wallander – Tjuven =

- Directed by: Stephan Apelgren
- Written by: Lars Lundström
- Produced by: Malte Forssell
- Starring: Krister Henriksson; Lena Endre; Sverrir Gudnason; Nina Zanjani
- Release date: 19 August 2009
- Running time: 87 minutes
- Country: Sweden
- Language: Swedish

Wallander – Tjuven (The Thief) is a 2009 film / television drama about the Swedish police detective Kurt Wallander directed by Stephan Apelgren. Tjuven was released to DVD and broadcast as part of the second series of the Wallander (Swedish TV series), as episode 4 of 13.

== Synopsis ==
Some homes are burgled and a vigilante group is formed. Soon Wallander is convinced that a double murder has occurred, although no bodies have been found.

== Cast ==
- Krister Henriksson as Kurt Wallander
- Lena Endre as Katarina Ahlsell
- Sverrir Gudnason as Pontus
- Nina Zanjani as Isabelle
- Fredrik Gunnarsson as Svartman
- Mats Bergman as Nyberg
- Douglas Johansson as Martinsson
- Stina Ekblad as Karin
- Henny Åman as Hanna, Katarina's daughter
- Jacob Ericksson as Olle
- Shanti Roney as Ralf
- Kalle Westerdahl as Peter
- Karin Lithman as Anne
- Kola Krauze as Jarek
- Vera Veljovic-Jovanovic as Maja
- Harald Leander as Journalist
- Max Lindmaa as Hooligan
