= Wallander (Swedish TV series) =

2005–2013 Swedish crime TV series

- Genre: Crime fiction
- Directed by: Stephan Apelgren; Anders Engström; Jørn Faurschou; Jonas Grimås; Leif Magnusson; Charlotte Brandström
- Starring: Krister Henriksson; Johanna Sällström; Ola Rapace; Mats Bergman; Fredrik Gunnarsson; Douglas Johansson; Stina Ekblad; Lena Endre
- Composer: Adam Nordén
- Country of origin: Sweden
- Original language: Swedish
- No. of seasons: 3
- No. of episodes: 32

Production
- Production locations: Ystad, Sweden
- Cinematography: Peter Mokrosinski; Geoff Boyle
- Running time: 89 minutes
- Production companies: Svensk Filmindustri; Yellow Bird; ARD Degeto

Original release
- Network: TV4
- Release: 14 January 2005 – 30 July 2013

Wallander (Swedish pronunciation: [vaˈlǎnːdɛr]) is a Swedish television series adapted from Henning Mankell's Kurt Wallander novels, starring Krister Henriksson in the title role. The first season of thirteen films was produced in 2005 and 2006, with one taken directly from a novel and the remainder with new storylines suggested by Mankell. The second season of thirteen films was shown between 2009 and 2010. The stories are set in Ystad, Skåne near the southern tip of Sweden.

The three films Before the Frost (#1), Mastermind (#6), and The Secret (#13) were premiered in cinemas, with the rest first released as direct-to-DVD movies. The first episode of the second series, Hämnden (The Revenge), was released in Swedish cinemas in January 2009; the rest of the series was made for television. A third and final season, containing six 90 minute episodes, aired in 2013 with Charlotta Jonsson replacing the late Johanna Sällström as Linda Wallander. The first episode, adapted from the novel The Troubled Man, was released in cinemas in January 2013.

== Season 1, 2005–06 ==
From 2005 to 2006, the first 13 new stories, starring Krister Henriksson as Kurt Wallander, were produced. The first film is based on the Henning Mankell novel Before the Frost and was released in cinemas. The rest of the films are original stories based on plots written by Mankell, with scriptwriting completed by others. Two more were theatrical releases, and the rest were released on DVD and shown on TV.

No.	Title	Original release date	Length
1	"Innan frosten" "Before the Frost"	14 January 2005	89 minutes
A missing grandmother leads Kurt Wallander on the trail of a religious cult. Tracking a sadistic killer, he follows a string of incidents, including ritual murders and attacks on domestic animals, with the help of his daughter Linda, a new member of the police, in the town of Ystad.
2	"Byfånen" "The Village Idiot"	3 August 2005	92 minutes
A man with learning difficulties blows himself up while trying to rob a bank. Linda is promoted to a detective and, against Kurt's advice, considers sharing a cottage with Stefan.
3	"Bröderna" "The Brothers"	7 September 2005	90 minutes
Kurt Wallander and his colleagues uncover the connections between a series of murders and a military training exercise. Becoming roommates makes Linda and Stefan's relationship more complicated.
4	"Mörkret" "The Overdose a.k.a. The Darkness"	12 October 2005	89 minutes
When an abandoned baby is found in a car, Kurt Wallander oversees a big operation to find the missing father. The case brings back memories for Linda of her own past and Kurt deals with a troubling health issue.
5	"Afrikanen" "The African"	16 November 2005	88 minutes
Ystad CID intervenes in the investigation of an African man's apparent suicide in a rail yard. The investigation reveals the murder weapon is connected to one of Kurt's oldest friends. Linda and Stefan's relationship affects the investigation.
6	"Mastermind" "Mastermind"	13 December 2005	98 minutes
Investigating a grisly local murder and the disappearance of a policeman's daughter, Ystad CID begins to suspect the two are connected. A connection to an earlier case begins to focus the investigation.
7	"Den svaga punkten" "The Tricksters a.k.a. The Weak Point"	15 March 2006	87 minutes
When a riding pupil finds the stable owner dead in his barn, Wallander is initially at a loss for suspects—the dead man had no friends, no social life, and seemingly no enemies. However, a little digging reveals a much more complicated and sinister story and soon the suspect list is too large. Kurt's brief romance leaves confusion.
8	"Fotografen" "The Photographer"	10 May 2006	89 minutes
A middle-aged American woman at a photo exhibition steals an exhibit and is found dead in the harbour. Her spouse believes she was having an affair, and wants her body and all her belongings to be sent back to the US. The autopsy reveals she is four months pregnant. Both Kurt and Linda struggle with their private lives.
9	"Täckmanteln" "The Container Lorry"	12 July 2006	87 minutes
An abandoned lorry is discovered to contain dead refugees.
10	"Luftslottet" "The Castle Ruins"	23 August 2006	88 minutes
An old man who withdraws 20 million kronor from the bank is found poisoned. His neighbours are suspected, but they are the next to be poisoned.
11	"Blodsband" "The Black King a.k.a. Blood Line"	25 October 2006	89 minutes
Following an argument with her lover on her boat, a woman is found dead. Wallander and the Ystad police investigate; their enquiries lead them to a farm commune and to an old friend of Linda's.
12	"Jokern" "The Forger a.k.a. The Joker"	1 November 2006	88 minutes
When a woman is shot dead on the beach outside her restaurant, the only witness is her young daughter. Wallander and his team are informed about a restaurant mafia in Malmö run by Jack Hansson, so the Malmö police are called in to help. One of their cops, Frank Borg, knows a little bit too much about Jack's business dealings, and his methods are unconventional.
13	"Hemligheten" "The Secret"	10 November 2006	90 minutes
When an 11-year-old boy is found dead, the team struggle in overcoming the emotional torment the case causes them.

== Season 2, 2009–10 ==
In 2008, a further 13 films were commissioned. Filming began in August 2008, and continued during 2009. The 13 episodes were released during 2009 and 2010.

The first of these films, Hämnden (The Revenge), was a theatrical release on 9 January 2009, directed by award-winning Paris-based Franco-Swedish director Charlotte Brandström. The remaining 12 films went directly to DVD in Scandinavia during 2009 and 2010, and were broadcast there at a later date. In the beginning of 2010, both Canvas TV in Belgium and BBC Four in the UK began airing the 13 episodes weekly, which meant that they both showed the two last episodes before these had been released in Scandinavia.

Hämnden (The Revenge) also received a brief US theatrical release on May 25, 2012, from Music Box Films, as a tie-in to promote their American VOD release of the Season 2 episodes.

The episodes in the second series are:

No.	Title	Original release date	Length
14	"Hämnden" "The Revenge"	9 January 2009 (Sweden), 27 February 2010 (Belgium)	95 minutes
Wallander has bought a dream house by the sea, but his peace and quiet are soon shattered when a man is murdered, a Ystad power substation is blown up, and several car bombs are detonated. The local populace suspects Islamic extremists, but when the army is called in, Wallander believes otherwise.
15	"Skulden" "The Guilt"	17 June 2009 (Sweden), 6 March 2010 (Belgium)	93 minutes
When a young boy goes missing, suspicions immediately fall on a previously convicted child sex offender, and vigilantes start attacking him and his elderly mother. However, when the boy is found dead with a high dosage of a sedative, Wallander starts to look elsewhere for the killer.
16	"Kuriren" "The Courier"	15 July 2009 (Sweden), 13 March 2010 (Belgium)	91 minutes
After the murder of a motorcyclist, the investigation soon reveals that bike racers are being used as drug couriers from Denmark to Sweden and that the killing was part of a power struggle within the Yugoslav drug cartel that is running the couriers. When one of Wallander's colleagues is attacked in her home, it's obvious that one of the cartel leaders will let nobody stand in his way.
17	"Tjuven" "The Thief"	18 August 2009 (Sweden), 20 March 2010 (Belgium)	87 minutes
Homes are burgled and a vigilante group is formed. Soon Wallander is convinced there's been a double murder, although no bodies have been found.
18	"Cellisten" "The Cellist"	19 September 2009 (Sweden), 27 March 2010 (Belgium)	92 minutes
The police go to great lengths to protect a cellist who is due to testify in a Russian mafia trial. While on a stakeout, trainee Pontus is shot.
19	"Prästen" "The Priest"	21 October 2009 (Sweden), 3 April 2010 (Belgium)	89 minutes
A priest is shot outside a low-budget hotel in Ystad and is fighting for his life in hospital. Wallander has no clues until he finds out that the priest was having an affair.
20	"Läckan" "The Leak"	18 November 2009 (Sweden), 10 April 2010 (Belgium)	93 minutes
When a security van is robbed, Wallander suspects a leak inside the security company.
21	"Skytten" "The Sniper"	16 December 2009 (Sweden), 17 April 2010 (Belgium)	93 minutes
When a small-time crook is killed by a sniper, Wallander and the Ystad police investigate.
22	"Dödsängeln" "The Angel of Death"	20 January 2010 (Sweden), 24 April 2010 (Belgium)	93 minutes
A girl in a choir disappears and is later found dead; then her best friend in the choir also disappears. Suspicion falls on a strange man who has been seen in the neighbourhood.
23	"Vålnaden" "The Ghost, a.k.a. The Phantom"	24 March 2010 (Sweden), 1 May 2010 (Belgium)	93 minutes
A cottage by the sea, owned by a local charity that lets it out to the public, is ravaged by a gas explosion. The burned corpse of a man is found inside and a badly burned woman is found outside, dying in hospital before she's able to talk. When they are identified later, a web of betrayal, secrets, and love affairs is revealed. The woman's husband, who was also the business partner of the dead man, is immediately suspected. But then he too is murdered...
24	"Arvet" "The Heritage"	21 April 2010 (Sweden), 8 May 2010 (Belgium)	96 minutes
A cider manufacturer is murdered during a business party. When more people with connections to the business are killed, Wallander starts suspecting that the killer is to be found within the company. And is there perhaps more than one killer?
25	"Indrivaren" "The Collector, a.k.a. The Dun"	22 May 2010 (Belgium), 12 June 2010 (United Kingdom), 16 June 2010 (Sweden)	92 minutes
A woman is found murdered in her flat, and in the subsequent investigation the loyalty of one of Wallander's young colleagues is put to the test.
26	"Vittnet" "The Witness"	5 June 2010 (Belgium), 19 June 2010 (United Kingdom), 21 July 2010 (Sweden)	92 minutes
A young girl is hiding somewhere in Ystad. She has seen something terrible and someone wants her silenced. At the same time, a trial of human traffickers starts, and both Wallander and district prosecutor Katarina Ahlsell receive death threats, forcing them to assess their jobs as well as their own relationship.

After filming completed on the 2009 series, Henriksson stated that he would not play Wallander again, having only signed the new contract because he thought the 2005 series could have been better. However, he later indicated that he would be interested in playing the role in an adaptation of the final Wallander novel, The Troubled Man, because "it is the definite end".

== Season 3, 2013 ==
A third and final season, containing six 90-minute episodes, was released in 2013 with Charlotta Jonsson as Linda Wallander. The first episode, adapted from the novel The Troubled Man, was released in cinemas in January 2013, and the rest on DVD. The series finale premiered 30 July 2013.

No.	Title	Original release date
27	"Den orolige mannen" "The Troubled Man"	11 January 2013
Wallander's daughter Linda is married and has a daughter of her own. The disappearance of Linda’s father-in-law draws Wallander into a case that has roots in Swedish submarine incidents.
28	"Försvunnen" "Missing"	19 January 2013
Just back from suspension from the police department, Wallander conducts an investigation into the disappearance of a girl which has frightening similarities to a case he worked ten years earlier.
29	"Sveket" "The Betrayal"	24 July 2013
The estranged wife of a prominent man is found dead near the family home. The husband is the obvious suspect, but several loose ends suggest more is going on.
30	"Saknaden" "The Loss"	30 July 2013
Wallander travels to Moldova to learn more about a woman found dead in Ystad. Upon returning to Sweden, he searches for her missing baby.
31	"Mordbrännaren" "The Arsonist"	30 July 2013
When a man dies in a fire, it looks as if a convicted arsonist recently released from prison is being framed, but he refuses to help the investigation exonerate him.
32	"Sorgfågeln" "The Sad Bird"	30 July 2013
As Wallander and Linda work with Malmö police to solve the kidnapping of a restaurateur, Wallander suspects that the police are involved in the crime.

== Cast ==
- Krister Henriksson as Kurt Wallander
- Johanna Sällström as Linda Wallander (series 1)
- Charlotta Jonsson as Linda Wallander (series 3)
- Douglas Johansson as Jan Martinsson
- Fredrik Gunnarsson as Johan Svartman
- Mats Bergman as Nyberg
- Ola Rapace as Stefan Lindman (series 1)
- Angela Kovács as Ann-Britt Höglund (series 1)
- Stina Ekblad as Karin Linder, the coroner
- Marianne Mörck as Ebba
- Göran Aronsson as Grönkvist
- Lena Endre as Katarina Ahlsell, prosecutor (series 2)
- Nina Zanjani as Isabelle Melin (series 2)
- Sverrir Gudnason as Pontus Höijer but introducing himself as 'Pontus Abs' in Kuriren (series 2)
- Gaston as Jussi (series 3)

== Production ==
The following are some other personnel involved:

- Executive producers: Åsa Sjöberg, Jenny Gilbertsson, Peter Bose, Lars Björkman, Morten Fisker, Anni Faurbye Fernandez, Mikael Wallen, Niva Westlin, Vibeke Windeløv.
- Producers: Malte Forsell, Ole Søndberg, Lars Björkman, Lasse Bjørkmann.
- Editors: Håkan Karlsson, Tomas Beije, Mattias Morheden, Hélène Berlin, Margareta Lagerqvist, Kristofer Nordin, Dino Jonsäter, Gustav Öström.

== Reception ==
To coincide with the BBC television adaptation, Wallander, BBC Four began broadcasting the 2005 series to United Kingdom audiences. Before the Frost and Mastermind were shown in November 2008; broadcast of the others began weekly in July 2009. Reviewing The Village Idiot and The Brothers in the Financial Times, John Lloyd wrote:

More evident is the philosophical underpinning that the books' author, Henning Mankell, brings, focusing down on the forensic work of a provincial detective the global sins of the western world. This coming week’s episode, The Brothers, is a murder mystery emerging from a terrible crime perpetrated by a group of drunken men on colonised people; last week's, The Village Idiot, had at its core the moral obloquy of a private surgeon greedy for profit.
Wallander and his comrades seek what remedies they can to the consequences of the sins of oppression and greed. At one point, Wallander tells his daughter, Linda, who is applying to become a detective, that she should reflect—otherwise she, like him, will emerge from a tunnel 30 years later, wondering what had happened to life. What had happened for Wallander is a melancholy immersion in human degradation, a provincial Inferno without a Virgil to guide him.

Writing in Örnsköldsviks Allehanda after the release of The Thief (2009), Peter Carlsson complained that only the first and last films of the successive series were any good, pointing out that these are the ones released to cinemas. Carlsson further criticised that the middle films "are often predictable, tentative and carelessly made", and that the arrest of the criminal is anticlimactic.

As a series, Wallander was nominated for The International TV Dagger at the 2009 Crime Thriller Awards, an awards ceremony presented by British television channel ITV3 and the Crime Writers' Association.

Series 2 won the International TV Dagger at the 2010 Crime Thriller Awards, an awards ceremony presented by British television channel ITV3 and the Crime Writers' Association.

== DVD releases ==
- The first season was released in installment sets.
- The first set of season 1 was released on a single Region 1 DVD by MHz Networks on 31 August 2010 under the title; Henning Mankell's Wallander: Episodes 1–3.
- The second set of season 1 was released on a single Region 1 DVD by MHz Networks on 21 September 2010 under the title; Henning Mankell's Wallander: Episodes 4–6.
- The third set of season 1 was released on a single Region 1 DVD by MHz Networks on 23 November 2010 under the title; Henning Mankell's Wallander: Episodes 7–9.
- The fourth & final set of season 1 was released on a single Region 1 DVD by MHz Networks on 23 November 2010 under the title; Henning Mankell's Wallander: Episodes 10–13.
- The 13 episodes of season 2 were released in a Region 1, seven DVD set by Music Box Films on 29 May 2012 under the title; Henning Mankell's Wallander (#MBFHE-034).
- The third season of 6 episodes were released in a Region 1, four DVD set by MHz Networks on 27 May 2014 under the title; Henning Mankell's Wallander 3.
