= Vi hade i alla fall tur med vädret – igen =

- Directed by: Kjell-Åke Andersson
- Written by: Santiago Gil; Kjell-Åke Andersson
- Produced by: Peter Possne
- Music by: Björn J:son Lindh
- Distributed by: Svensk Filmindustri
- Release date: 5 December 2008 (Sweden)
- Running time: 95 minutes
- Country: Sweden
- Language: Swedish

Vi hade i alla fall tur med vädret – igen ("We were at least lucky with the weather – again") is a Swedish comedy film directed by Kjell-Åke Andersson, which was released premiere to cinemas in Sweden on 5 December 2008. It is a sequel to the 1980 film Vi hade i alla fall tur med vädret.

== Plot ==
Now, almost 30 years after their travel trailer vacation, Gösta and Gun are pensioners. This summer they'll go to their son Johan's wedding in Norrland. Gösta buys a recreational vehicle for their journey but Gun perhaps wants to go by aircraft, but in the end she wants to go with Gösta by the recreational vehicle. On the way, they pick up their granddaughter Magda. But may Gösta really make a good journey?

== Selected cast ==
- Rolf Skoglund as Gösta
- Claire Wikholm as Gun
- Mikaela Knapp as Magda, Lotta's and Peppe's daughter
- Gustav Berg as Jens, Magda's boyfriend
- Magdalena in de Betou as Lotta, Gösta's and Gun's daughter
- Jacob Ericksson as Peppe
- Robin Stegmar as Johan
- Ellen Mattsson as Pia, Johan's girlfriend
- Sissela Kyle as Doctor
- Johan Glans as Hambörje
- Ulf Kvensler as Camping receptionist
- Michalis Koutsogiannakis as Miklos

== Home video ==
The film was released to DVD in 2009.
