= Tomas Norström =

Swedish actor and film director (1956–2021)

- Born: 23 May 1956
- Died: 3 October 2021 (aged 65); Stockholm, Sweden
- Occupation(s): Actor and film director

Stig Tomas Norström (23 May 1956 – 3 October 2021) was a Swedish actor and film director. He also recorded audiobooks, among them J. R. R. Tolkien's works.

Norström studied at the Swedish National Academy of Mime and Acting until 1981, together with Jessica Zandén, Maria Johansson, Sissela Kyle, and Peter Stormare.

== Partial filmography ==
- 1976: Near and Far Away - Gregor
- 1977: Mackan - Roffe
- 1979: En kärleks sommar - Laboratorieassistenten
- 1979: Kejsaren - Dräng
- 1980: Der Mann, der sich in Luft auflöste - Kvant
- 1981: Höjdhoppar'n - Rickard
- 1981: Varning för Jönssonligan - Kriminalassistent Holm
- 1983: Second Dance - Manne
- 1984: Två solkiga blondiner - Holken
- 1984: Sköna juveler - Robber
- 1985: Svindlande affärer - Tecknar-Micke
- 1987: Res aldrig på enkel biljett
- 1988: Som man ropar (TV Mini Series) - Gerard
- 1988: Venus 90 - Kenneth, Sound engineer
- 1990: Werther - Max Karlsson
- 1990: S*M*A*S*H (TV Mini Series) - Börje
- 1990: I skog och mark
- 1990: The Rabbit Man - Henrik
- 1990: Good Evening, Mr. Wallenberg - Andersson
- 1991: The White Viking - Bishop Thangbrandur
- 1992: Hammar - Bror Hammar
- 1992: Min store tjocke far - Vicar
- 1993: Dreaming of Rita - Verkstadsägare
- 1993: Kådisbellan - Boxing Trainer
- 1994: Polismördaren - Herrgott Nöjd
- 1994: Stockholm Marathon - Ypsilon (voice, uncredited)
- 1994: Händerna - Kjell-Åke
- 1994: Bert (TV Series) - Banan-Boris Strängborn
- 1995: Vita lögner - Delgivningsman
- 1996: Jägarna - Ove
- 1996: Drömprinsen - Filmen om Em - Larsa
- 1996: Lögn - The Associate Professor's Mother's Lover
- 1997: Reine & Mimmi i fjällen! - Folke Nilsson
- 1998-2000: Pistvakt – En vintersaga (TV Series) - Olle Ivar Marklund / Pelle
- 2000: Hur som helst är han jävligt död - Editor Flink
- 2002: Livet i 8 bitar - Stig
- 2003: Kitchen Stories - Folke Nilsson
- 2005: Spadek - Krister
- 2005: Pistvakt - Olle Ivar Marklund
- 2005: Wallander (TV Series) - Kuratorn
- 2006: Inga tårar - Arvid
- 2006: LasseMajas detektivbyrå (TV Series) - Polismästaren
- 2007: Beck (TV Series) - Jon Ljunggren
- 2007: Blåbärskriget - Bärkungen
- 2008: LasseMajas detektivbyrå – Kameleontens hämnd - Polismästaren
- 2010: Home for Christmas - Kristen
- 2013: LasseMajas detektivbyrå - Von Broms hemlighet - Polismästaren
- 2014: LasseMajas detektivbyrå - Skuggor över Valleby - Polismästaren
- 2015: Villmark Asylum - Frank
- 2015: LasseMajas detektivbyrå - Stella Nostra - Polismästaren
- 2016: A Cure for Wellness - Frank Hill
- 2018: LasseMajas detektivbyrå - Det första mysteriet - Police Chief / Gym Teacher
- 2020: Lasse-Majas detektivbyrå – Tågrånarens hemlighet - Polismästaren

He also directed the 2008 film Gunnel together with Henrik Carlheim-Gyllenskiöld.
