= Vi hade i alla fall tur med vädret =

- Written by: Kjell Sundvall; Börje Hansson; Kjell-Åke Andersson
- Directed by: Kjell Sundvall
- Starring: Tobias Swärd; Jimmy Sandin; Per Oscarsson
- Composer: Örjan Fahlström
- Country of origin: Sweden
- Original language: Swedish

Production
- Cinematography: Kjell-Åke Andersson
- Running time: 57 minutes
- Production company: Sveriges Television

Original release
- Network: TV 2
- Release: 27 February 1980

Related
- Vi hade i alla fall tur med vädret (2008)

Vi hade i alla fall tur med vädret ("We were at least lucky with the weather") is a Swedish TV comedy film directed by Kjell Sundvall. It originally aired over SVT on 27 February 1980. In 2008 it was followed by the film Vi hade i alla fall tur med vädret – igen.

== Plot ==
The family Backlund are going on travel trailer vacation. But Gösta doesn't like that Rudolf, the children's grandpa, has been promised to follow them. During the vacation there is always an incident after the other.

== Selected cast ==
- Rolf Skoglund as Gösta Backlund
- Claire Wikholm as Gun Backlund
- Charlotte Thomsen as Lotta Backlund
- Johan Öhman as Johan Backlund
- Gunnar Lindkvist as Rudolf, grandpa (Gun's father)
- Rune Pettersson as motorcycle-policeman

== Home video ==
The film was released to home video in 1983.
