= Kalle Westerdahl =

Swedish actor (born 1966)

- Born: 1966 (age 59–60); Askim, Sweden
- Occupation: Actor

Kalle Westerdahl (born 1966) is a Swedish actor. He has travelled around and played his monologue Man i djungeln. He played Robert Lind in a production of Donna Juanita at Stockholm City Theatre in 2016.

== Selected filmography ==
- 1988 - Xerxes
- 1993 - Allis med is (TV)
- 1994 - Bert
- 1994 - Sommarmord
- 1994 - Rapport till himlen (TV)
- 2000 - Pistvakt – En vintersaga (TV)
- 2000 - I väntan på bruden
- 2001 - Om inte
- 2004 - Kyrkogårdsön
- 2004 - Falla vackert
- 2007 - En riktig jul (TV, "Julkalendern")
- 2008 - Allt flyter
- 2009 - Wallander – Tjuven
