= Karin Bertling =

Swedish actress

- Born: Karin Boel Bertling; 25 May 1937 (age 88); Sweden
- Occupation: Actress

Karin Boel Bertling (born 25 May 1937) is a Swedish actress.

== Selected filmography ==
- 2002–04 – Skeppsholmen (TV series)
- 2003 – Hannah med H
- 2003 – The Man Who Smiled (TV)
- 2004 – Camp Slaughter
- 2005 – Wallander – Innan frosten
- 2008 – Skägget i brevlådan (TV, Julkalendern)
- 2015 – Granny's Dancing on the Table
- 2023 – Tore (TV series)
- 2024 – Veronika
