= Spinning Man =

- Theatrical release poster
- Directed by: Simon Kaijser
- Screenplay by: Matthew Aldrich
- Based on: The Spinning Man by George Harrar
- Produced by: Ellen S. Wander; Keith Arnold
- Starring: Guy Pearce; Pierce Brosnan; Minnie Driver; Alexandra Shipp; Clark Gregg; Odeya Rush
- Cinematography: Polly Morgan
- Music by: Jean-Paul Wall
- Production companies: Grindstone Entertainment Group; Film Bridge International; Chimney Co.
- Distributed by: Lionsgate Premiere
- Release date: April 6, 2018 (United States)
- Countries: United States; Sweden
- Language: English
- Budget: $8.5 million
- Box office: $283,755

Spinning Man is a 2018 thriller film directed by Simon Kaijser based on a novel by George Harrar and adapted to screenplay by Matthew Aldrich. It stars Guy Pearce, Pierce Brosnan, Minnie Driver, Alexandra Shipp, Clark Gregg and Odeya Rush. The film was released on video on demand as well as experiencing limited release by Lionsgate Premiere on April 6, 2018.

== Premise ==
Evan Birch (Guy Pearce) is a family man and esteemed professor of philosophy at a distinguished college. When Joyce Bonner, a high school student, goes missing, Evan's previous off-campus dalliances cause his wife, Ellen (Minnie Driver), to question his alibi. Meticulous police detective Robert Malloy (Pierce Brosnan) has even more reason to be suspicious when crucial evidence makes Evan the prime suspect in Joyce's disappearance. Suddenly, the questions Evan faces are not merely academic – they are a matter of life or death.

== Cast ==
- Guy Pearce as Dr. Evan Birch
- Pierce Brosnan as Det. Robert Malloy
- Minnie Driver as Ellen Birch
- Alexandra Shipp as Anna, a student in Evan's philosophy class
- Odeya Rush as Joyce Bonner
- Clark Gregg as Paul, Evan's lawyer
- Jamie Kennedy as Ross, Evan's colleague
- Freya Tingley as Mary

== Production ==
First announced in May 2016 by Film Bridge International, the picture was intended to be Danish film-maker, Peter Flinth's directorial debut in the US, with Nikolaj Coster-Waldau set to star as the lead character alongside Greg Kinnear and Emma Roberts, while filming was originally set to commence in Minnesota a month later. However, in April 2017, a new cast and crew were revealed, putting Guy Pearce in the shoes of the main protagonist, a troubled professor, co-starring with Pierce Brosnan, Minnie Driver and Alexandra Shipp, while Simon Kaijser was announced as the director. Jamie Kennedy also joined the cast the next day, with Clark Gregg coming on board a month later. Principal photography began in May 2017.

== Release ==
The film was released on 6 April 2018, by Lionsgate Premiere.

== Reception ==
On review aggregator website Rotten Tomatoes, the film holds an approval rating of 50%, based on 12 reviews, and an average rating of 5.3/10. On Metacritic, the film has a weighted average score of 44 out of 100, based on 6 critics, indicating "mixed or average reviews".
