= Stromdahl =

Stromdahl is a surname. Notable people with the surname include:

- Brad Stromdahl (born 1977), American baseball coach
- Lena Strömdahl (born 1947), Swedish actress
- Reidar Strømdahl, Norwegian politician
