= Malena Engström =

Swedish actress

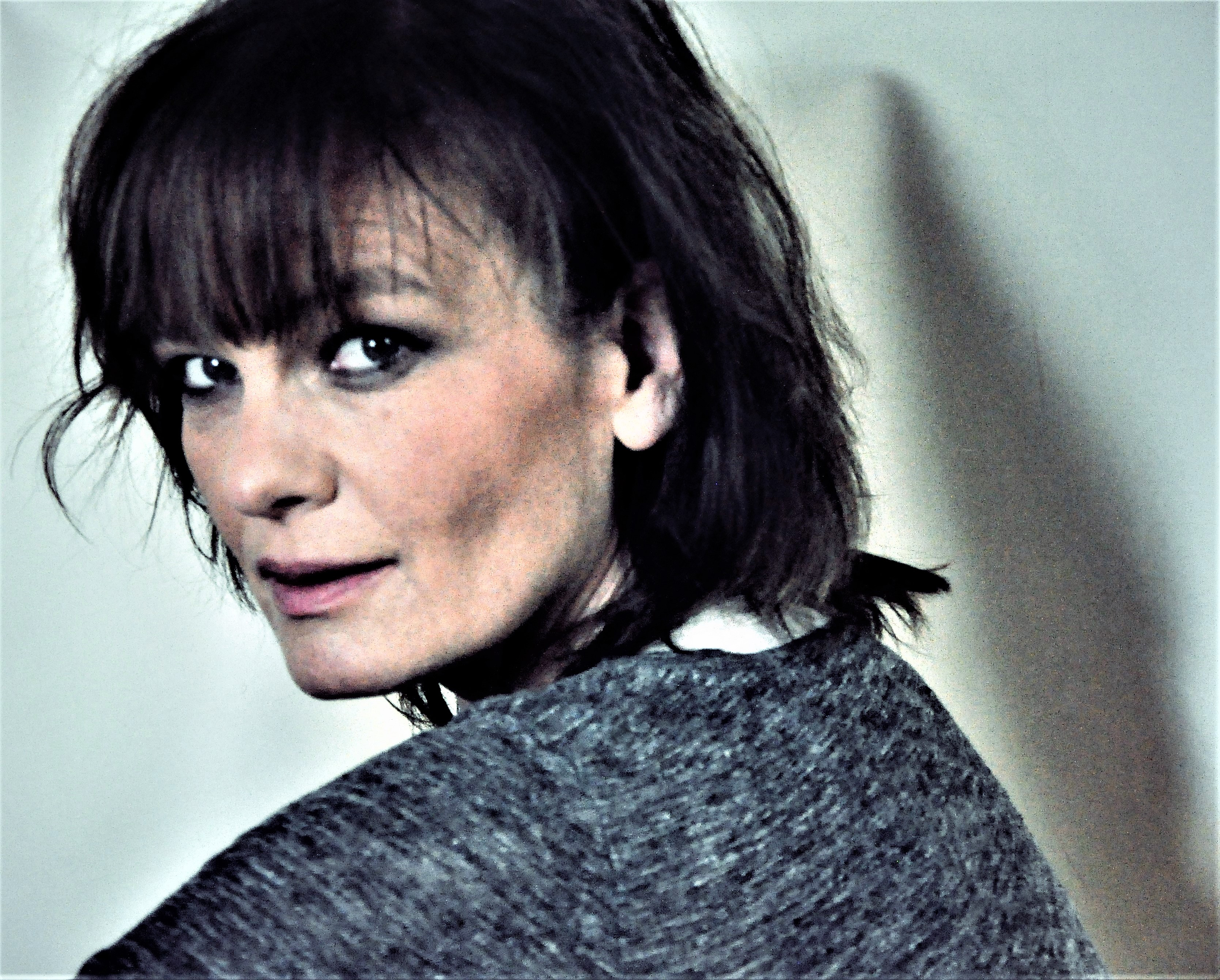
Malena Engström

Malena Engström (born 1967 in Västerås) is a Swedish actress.

== Selected filmography ==
- 2000 – Rederiet (TV)
- 2000 – Brottsvåg (TV)
- 2002 – Klassfesten
- 2003 – Spung (TV)
- 2004 – Falla vackert
- 2004 – Att sörja Linnea (TV)
- 2005 – Wallander – Innan frosten
