= Thorskog House =

Building in Bohuslän, Sweden

Coordinates: 58.0333°N 12.1364°E

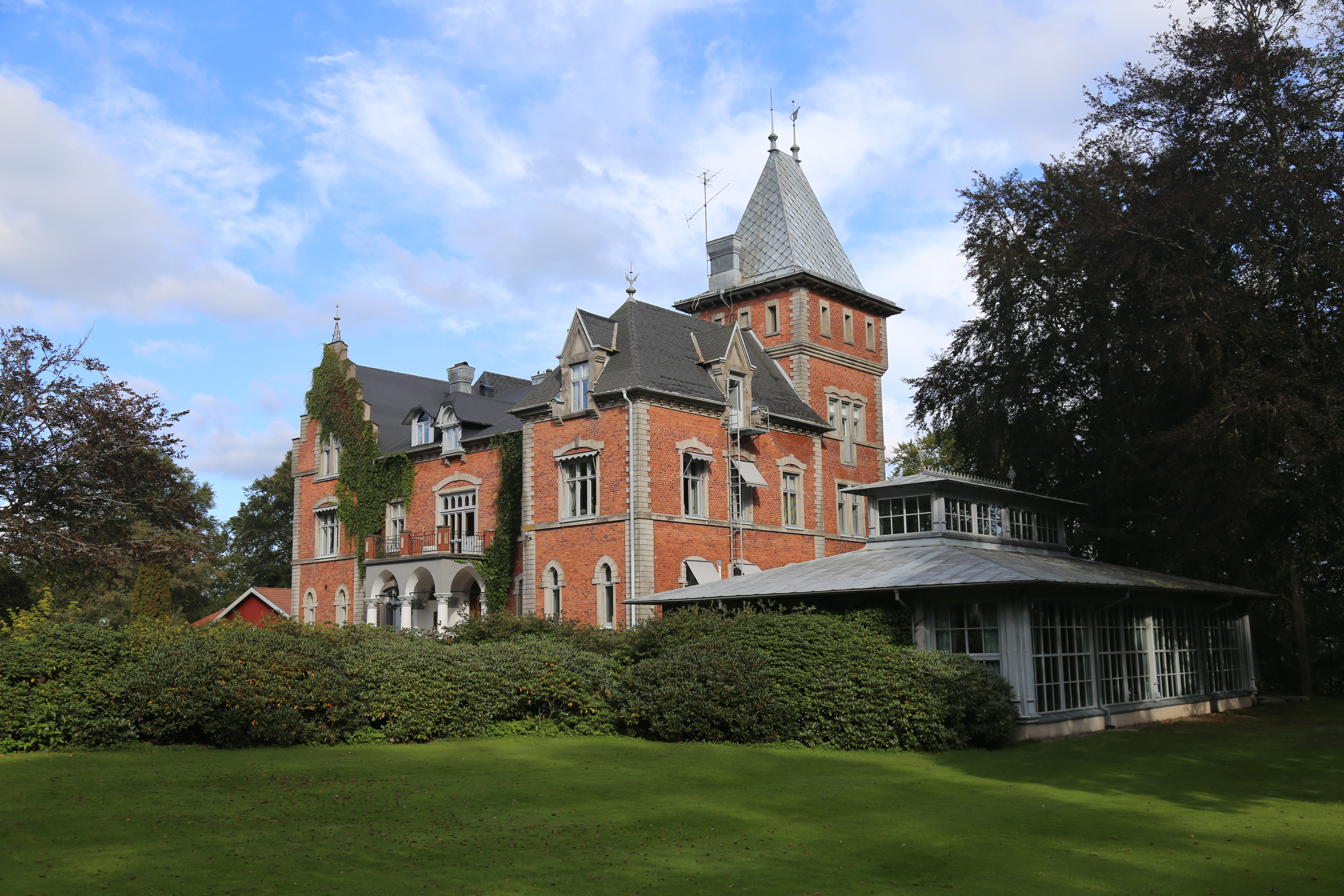
- Thorskogs slott
- Interactive map of the Thorskog House area

General information
- Location: Bohuslän, Sweden

Thorskog House (Swedish: Thorskogs slott) is a manor house in Bohuslän, Sweden. It is located in Lilla Edet Municipality. It was built in 1892 in accordance with the plans of architect Carl Fahlström (1854-1920).

Thorskogs slott operates as a hotel and is open to the public with 40 furnished rooms and restaurant facilities. Thorskogs slott was the location for the 2009 and 2010 seasons of the SVT show Stjärnorna på slottet.
