= Granny's Dancing on the Table =

2015 film

- Directed by: Hanna Sköld
- Written by: Hanna Sköld
- Starring: Karin Bertling
- Release date: 11 September 2015 (TIFF)
- Running time: 84 minutes
- Country: Sweden
- Language: Swedish

Granny's Dancing on the Table is a 2015 Swedish drama film directed by Hanna Sköld. It was screened in the Contemporary World Cinema section of the 2015 Toronto International Film Festival.

== Cast ==
- Blanca Engström as Eini
- Lennart Jähkel as The Father
- Karin Bertling as Granny
