= Balls (film) =

- Directed by: Josef Fares
- Written by: Josef Fares; Torkel Petersson
- Produced by: Anna Anthony
- Starring: Jan Fares; Torkel Petersson; Hamadi Khemiri; Nina Zanjani; Juan Rodriguez; Anita Wall; Jessica Forsberg
- Cinematography: Linus Eklund
- Distributed by: AB Svensk Filmindustri
- Release date: 12 February 2010 (Sweden)
- Running time: 98 minutes
- Country: Sweden
- Language: Swedish

Balls (Swedish: Farsan, lit. 'The dad') is a 2010 Swedish comedy film directed by Josef Fares and starring Jan Fares, Torkel Petersson, Hamadi Khemiri, Nina Zanjani, Juan Rodriguez, Anita Wall, and Jessica Forsberg.

== Cast ==
- Jan Fares as Aziz (farsan)
- Torkel Petersson as Jörgen
- Hamadi Khemiri as Sami
- Nina Zanjani as Amanda
- Juan Rodriguez as Juan
- Anita Wall as Edith
- Jessica Forsberg as Lotta

== Reception ==
In Sweden, the film got mixed reviews. In Aftonbladet the film was given a 3 out of 5 rating and was described as "not the best or funniest of Josef Fares's movies - but it is a warm and loving comical hommage to quirky fathers in general". In Expressen, the review was slightly less favorable (2 out of 5) and Fares was described as playing with safe cards in his somewhat artificial characters. In other big newspapers the reviews were similar: 3 out of 5 in Dagens Nyheter and 2 out of 6 in Svenska Dagbladet.
