= Peter Flinth =

Danish film director (born 1964)

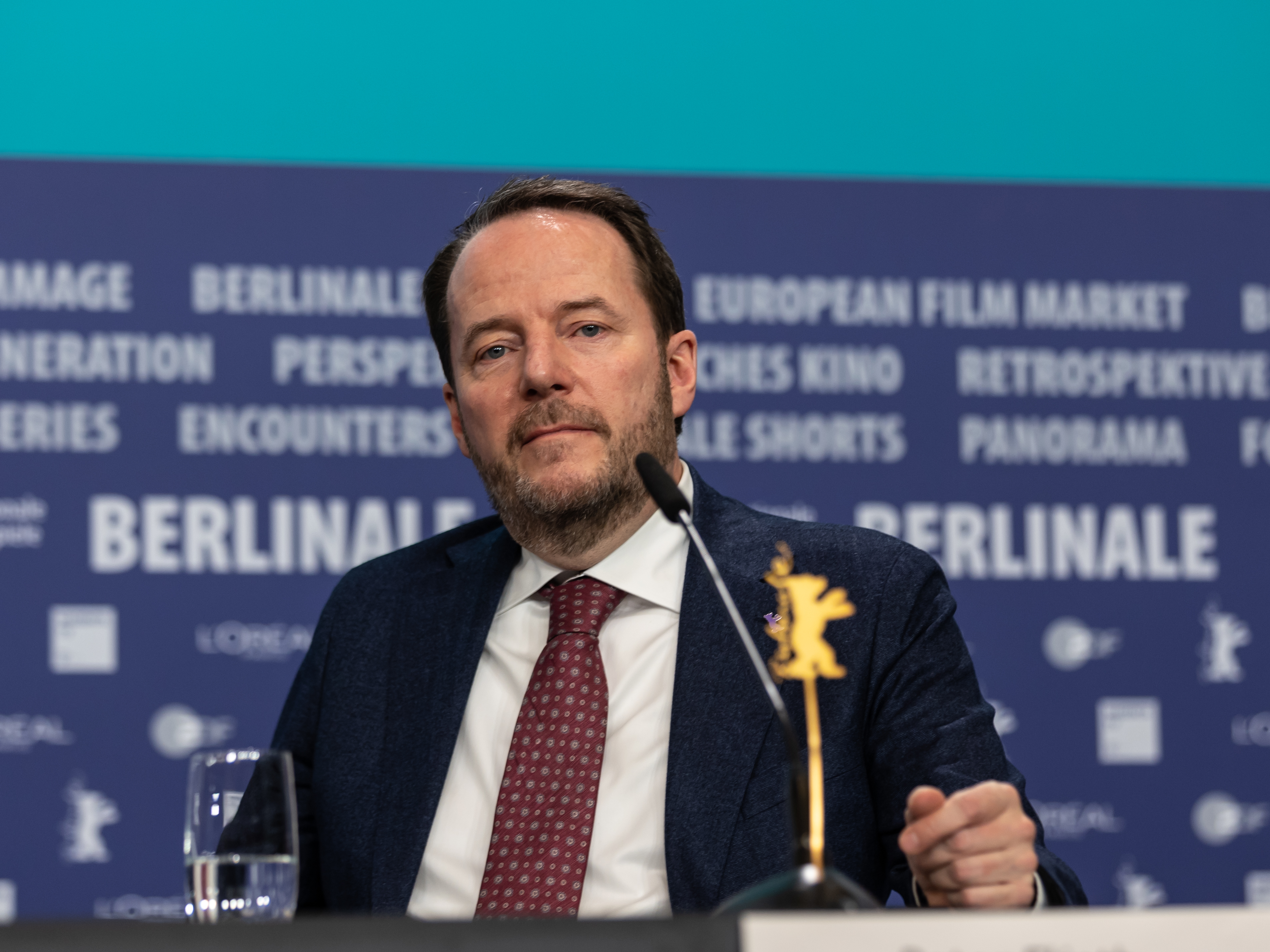
- Flinth at the 72nd Berlin International Film Festival, 2022
- Born: 7 November 1964 (age 61); Copenhagen, Denmark
- Occupation: Film director
- Years active: 1997–present
- Website: www.peterflinth.com

Peter Flinth (born 7 November 1964) is a Danish film director.

== Early life and education ==
Peter Flinth was born on 7 November 1964 in Copenhagen, Denmark. He studied film studies at the University of Copenhagen in 1984-86 and was educated on the Danish Film School's director line in 1989-1993. He was part of the Danish Film School's golden class of 1993, with notable graduates such as Thomas Vinterberg.

He was admitted to the National Film School of Denmark and in the same time worked as an assistant director on a number of Danish feature films, including most notably Ole Bornedal's Nightwatch, before graduating in 1993 with the short film Den Sidste Færge.

== Career ==
Flinth made his feature film debut in 1997 with the Eye of the Eagle. Since then, he has directed several films for the young audience, including The Olsen Gang Junior and The Fakir from Bilbao.

Flinth directed the Wallander crime novel Mastermind with Krister Henriksson in the lead role, then the Temple Knight saga about Arn, which resulted in two feature films. The film was the largest and most expensive film production in Scandinavian film history with a budget of 210 million Swedish crowns. Peter Flinth was subsequently named best director by Aftonbladet's readers, while the film was honored with best film and best screenplay. Since its premiere, Arn - The knight Templar has sold more than 2.1 million cinema tickets in Scandinavia and broke a record in Sweden with 160.00 tickets sold after the first two days in sale.

Since then, he has directed the Swedish Nobel Testament in 2012 and the Norwegian film Beatles in 2014, which is a film adaptation of Lars Saabye Christensen's novel.

In 2009, Flinth worked with Her Majesty Margrethe II of Denmark, on the film adaptation of H. C. Andersen's fairy tale The Wild Swans.

In 2022, Against the Ice, which is based on the true story written by Ejnar Mikkelsen, premiered at the 72nd Berlin International Film Festival and was released on Netflix on March 2, 2022. The film is a collaboration between director Peter Flinth and actor Nikolaj Coster-Waldau who has written the script and are also portraying the lead character.

== Awards ==
In 2010, Flinth was awarded with the Order of the Dannebrog.

== Filmography ==
=== Film ===
Year	Title	Credits
1997	Eye of the Eagle	Director
2001	Olsen Gang Junior	Director
2004	The Fakir	Director
2005	Wallander – Mastermind	Director
2007	Arn – The Knight Templar	Director
2008	Arn – The Kingdom at Road's End	Director
2009	The Wild Swans	Director
2012	Nobel's Last Will	Director
2012	A Place in the Sun	Director
2014	Beatles	Director
2019	The Shamer's Daughter 2: The Serpent Gift	Co-Producer
2022	Against The Ice	Director & Executive Producer

=== Short film ===
Year	Title	Credits
1991	Requiem	Director
1993	The Last Ferry	Director

=== Television ===
Year	Title	Credits
2000	Unit One	Director (2 episodes)
2010	Arn	Director

== Awards ==
- ”Beatles” (2014)
  - (Won) Jury Award, Best Feature Film, Riverside Int. Film Festival
  - (Won) Audience Award, Best Feature Film, Riverside Int. Film Festival
  - (Won) Youth Award, Best Foreign Film, Sao Paulo International Film Festival
  - (Won) Amanda Award, Best Production Design, The Norwegian International Film Festival
- ARN – The Knight Templar (2007)
  - (Won) Audience Award, Best Feature Film, Guldbagge Awards
  - (Won) Best Feature Film, European Film Academy Award
- ARN – The Kingdom at Road’s End (2008)
  - (Won) Audience Award, Best Feature Film, Guldbagge Awards
- The Fakir (2004)
  - (Won) Young Audience Award, Leeds International Film Festival
  - (Won) Jury Prize, Kristiansand International Children’s Film Festival
  - (Won) Robert Award, Danish Film Academy Award
- Eye of the Eagle (1997)
  - (Won) Best Feature Film, Zlin Int. Film Festival for Children
  - (Won) Best Feature Film, Cairo International Film Festival for Children
  - (Won) Robert Award, Best Screenplay, Danish Film Academy Award
