= Margareta Stone =

Swedish actress

Lena Margareta Stone (née Larsson; born 27 February 1962 in Boden, Sweden) is a Swedish actress.

== Selected filmography ==
- 1997 – Skärgårdsdoktorn (TV)
- 2000 – Soldater i månsken (TV)
- 2000 – Pistvakt – En vintersaga (TV)
- 2003 – Kommer du med mig då
- 2004 – The Return of the Dancing Master (TV)
- 2006 – LasseMajas detektivbyrå (TV series)
- 2006 – Kronprinsessan (TV)
- 2008 – LasseMajas detektivbyrå – Kameleontens hämnd
- 2009 – Män som hatar kvinnor
