= Helene Tursten =

Swedish writer of crime fiction

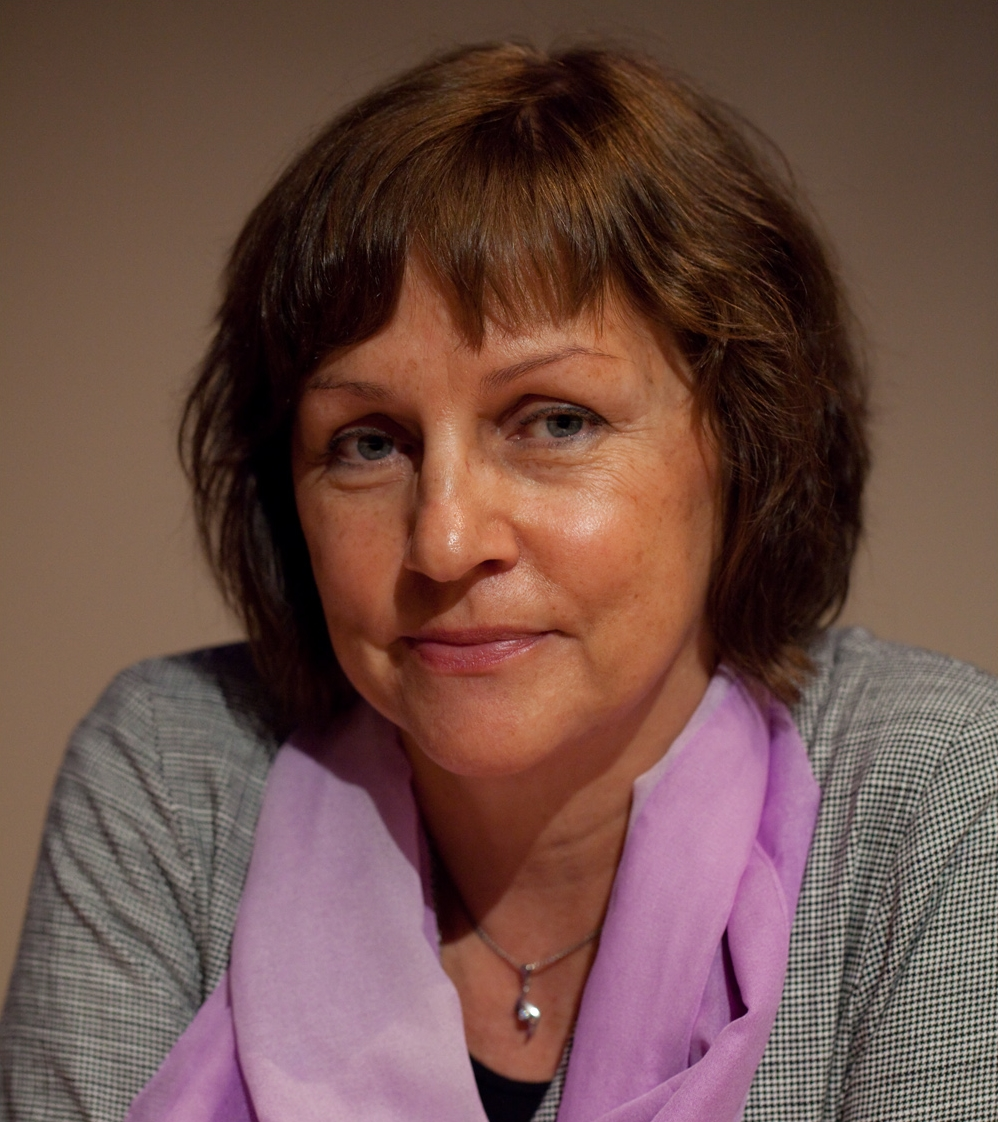
Helene Tursten in 2010

Helene Tursten (born in Gothenburg on February 17, 1954) is a Swedish writer of crime fiction.

== Life and career ==
The main character in her stories is Detective Inspector Irene Huss. Before becoming an author, Tursten worked as a nurse and then a dentist, but was forced to leave due to illness. During her illness, she worked as a translator of medical articles.

== Works ==
=== Books ===
- 1998 — Den krossade tanghästen (English translation: Detective Inspector Huss, 2003); Detective Inspector Irene Huss series #1
- 1999 — Nattrond (English translation: Night Rounds, 2012); Detective Inspector Irene Huss series #2
- 1999 — Tatuerad torso (English translation: The Torso, 2006); Detective Inspector Irene Huss series #3
- 2002 — Kallt mord; Detective Inspector Irene Huss series #3.1
- 2002 — Glasdjävulen (English translation: The Glass Devil, 2007); Detective Inspector Irene Huss series #4
- 2004 — Guldkalven (English translation: The Golden Calf, 2013); Detective Inspector Irene Huss series #5
- 2005 — Eldsdansen (English translation: The Fire Dance, 2014); Detective Inspector Irene Huss series #6
- 2007 — En man med litet ansikte (English translation: The Beige Man, 2015); Detective Inspector Irene Huss series #7
- 2008 — Det lömska nätet (English translation: The Treacherous Net, 2015); Detective Inspector Irene Huss series #8
- 2010 — Den som vakar i mörkret (English translation: Who Watcheth, 2016); Detective Inspector Irene Huss series #9
- 2012 — I skydd av skuggorna (English translation: Protected by the Shadows, 2017); Detective Inspector Irene Huss series #10
- 2013 — Mina Mindre Mord och Mysterier (English translation: An Elderly Lady Is Up to No Good: Stories, tr. Marlaine Delargy, 2018)
- 2014— Jaktmark (English translation: Hunting Game, tr. Paul Norlen 2019); Detective Inspector Embla Nyström series #1
- 2016 — Sandgrav (English translation: Winter Grave, tr. Marlaine Delargy, 2018); Detective Inspector Embla Nyström series #2
- 2018 — Snödrev (English translation: Snowdrift, tr. Marlaine Delargy, 2018); Detective Inspector Embla Nyström series #3
- 2020 — Äldre dam med mörka hemligheter (English translation: An Elderly Lady Must Not Be Crossed: Stories, tr. Marlaine Delargy, 2021)

=== Films ===
Several films have been made derived from Tursten's works featuring Irene Huss, produced by Illusion Films and Yellow Bird Films. These are in Swedish with Danish and English subtitles.

Irene Huss movies are a collection of films about a fictional Swedish police officer played by Angela Kovács. A total of twelve 90-minute films were produced between the years 2007 to 2011. All but three of the movies were based on the books of the same name titles, written by Tursten. The last three films were produced based instead on the books' characters and are thus independent stories. The films are set in the Gothenburg area, following Irene Huss in her work as a police officer and with her family, which is often strongly influenced by her work.

The twelve films were made in two installments: a first round of films released in 2007–2008, then a second round released in 2011. The first film played in cinemas before being released on DVD; all the others were released directly on DVD. The films have also been shown often on Kanal 5 in Sweden and ARD in Germany, as they were some of the financiers for the movies. Johan Fälemark and Hillevi Råberg were film producers in the first season. Daniel Ahlqvist was added as the third film producer in the second season.

- 2007 — Irene Huss — Tatuerad Torso
- 2007 — Den krossade tanghästen
- 2008 — Nattrond
- 2008 — Glasdjävulen
- 2008 — Eldsdansen
- 2008 — Guldkalven
- 2011 — Den som vakar i mörkret
- 2011 — Det lömska nätet
- 2011 — En man med litet ansikte
- 2011 — Tystnadens cirkel
- 2011 — I skydd av skuggorna
- 2011 — Jagad vittne
