= Mind the Gap (2007 film) =

- Directed by: Helena Bergström
- Written by: Denize Karabuda
- Produced by: Colin Nutley; Waldemar Bergendahl
- Starring: Rakel Wärmländer; Nina Zanjani; Korhan Abay
- Cinematography: Olof Johnson
- Music by: Per Andréasson
- Release date: 16 February 2007
- Running time: 103 minutes
- Country: Sweden
- Language: Swedish

Mind the Gap (Swedish: Se upp för dårarna, lit. 'Watch out for fools') is a 2007 Swedish film directed by Helena Bergström.

== Plot ==
The movie tells the story of Yasmin Demiroglu whose family moved from Turkey to Stockholm when she was eight years old. Yasmin's father Sinan had a good reputation as a cardio-thoracic surgeon while living in Turkey and is thus very unsatisfied with his job in Sweden – he is an underground train driver. Yasmin, 20 years of age, wants to show that she can fill an important position in society and has the big ambition of becoming the Minister of Justice of Sweden. Of course she has to begin in a small way and so she starts a police officer's apprenticeship at "Polishögskolan" where she meets Elin, a Swedish girl. The two of them become friends. Soon their relationship to each other and to their families are put to the test as several unexpected twists and turns take place.

== Cast ==
- Nina Zanjani as Yasmin Demiroglu
- Rakel Wärmländer as Elin Enecke
- Korhan Abay as Sinan Demiroglu
- Zinat Pirzadeh as Ayse Demiroglu
- Dan Ekborg as Ulf Enecke
- Birgitte Söndergaard as Ewa Enecke
- Lars Bethke as Stefan Ljungsäter
- Stella Enciso as Dilek Demiroglu
- Mattias Redbo as Henke Larsson
- Rasim Öztekin as Turkish Minister of Foreign Relations
- Erik Johansson as Axel Enecke

== Reception ==
A review in Aftonbladet characterized the film as rushed but praised the performances of Zanjani and Wärmländer.
