= Claire Wikholm =

Swedish actress

- Born: Claire Minna Patricia Olofsdotter Wikholm; 10 October 1944 (age 81); Stockholm, Sweden
- Occupations: Actress, writer
- Years active: 1968–present

Claire Minna Patricia Olofsdotter Wikholm (born 10 October 1944 in Stockholm) is a Swedish actress.

Wikholm worked at Malmö City Theatre 1968–71 and since then, she has worked at Stockholm City Theatre.

In November 2005, it was revealed that Wikholm has emphysema after smoking for many years. She participated in season ten of Stjärnorna på slottet in December and January 2015–16, broadcast on SVT.

== Selected filmography ==
- 1969 – Som natt och dag
- 1971 – Broster, Broster! (TV, "Julkalendern")
- 1973 – Bröllopet
- 1975 – A Guy and a Gal
- 1979 – Gå på vattnet om du kan
- 1979 – I Am Maria
- 1980 – Vi hade i alla fall tur med vädret
- 1982 – Gräsänklingar
- 1983 – Henrietta
- 1986 – Hassel – Beskyddarna
- 1992 – Luciafesten (TV)
- 1995 – Pensionat Oskar
- 2002 – Bella – bland kryddor och kriminella (TV)
- 2006 – Cars (Swedish title Bilar)
- 2007 – Allt om min buske
- 2008 – Vi hade i alla fall tur med vädret – igen
- 2008 – Everlasting Moments
