= Simon Kaijser =

Swedish film director (born 1969)

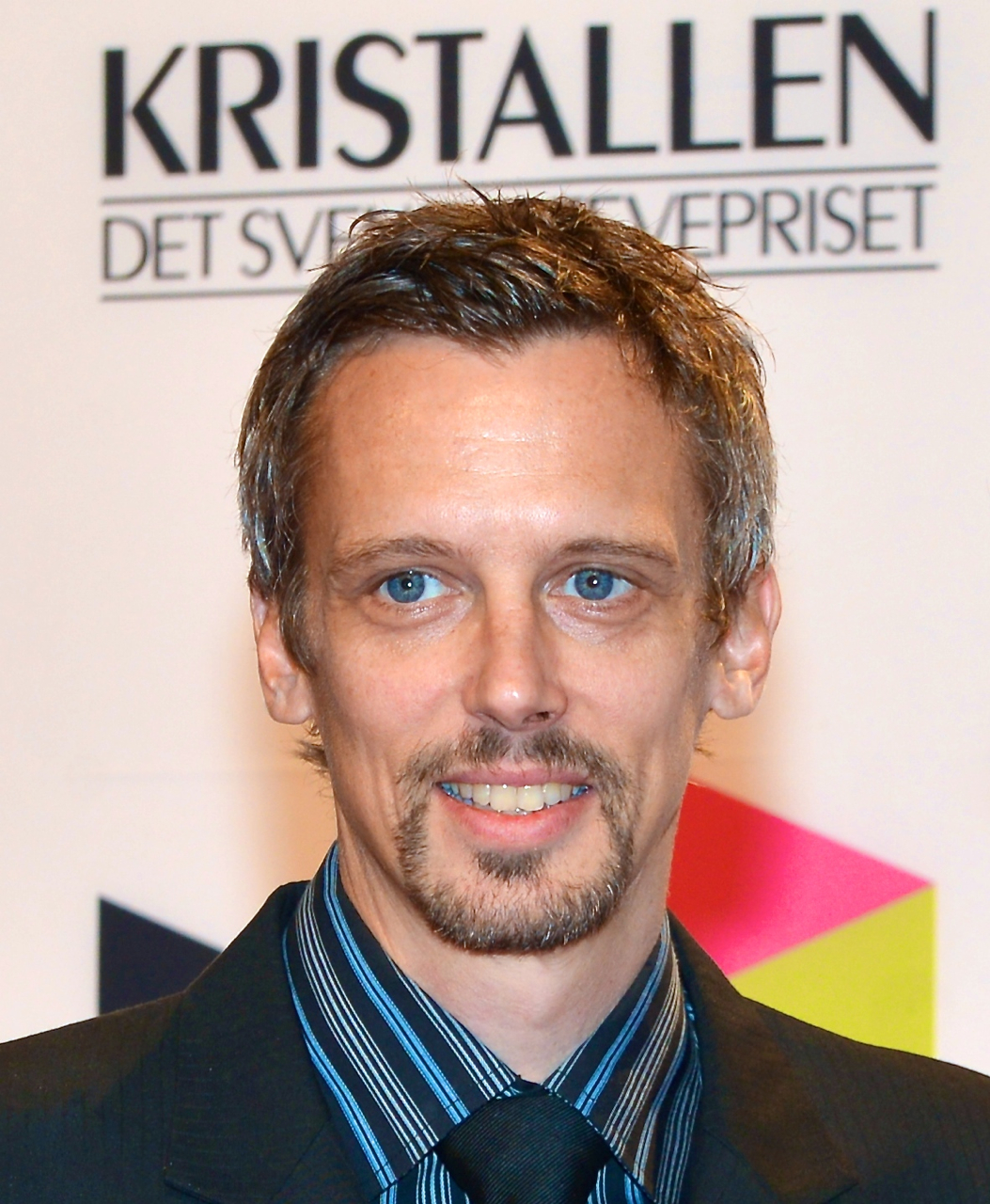
- Kaijser in 2013
- Born: 1969 (age 56–57)
- Occupation: Director

Simon Kaijser (born 1969) is a Swedish director. He was born in Danderyd, Sweden. He directed the 2018 mystery film Spinning Man. He directed the 2019 television series De dagar som blommorna blommar.

== Selected filmography ==
=== Director ===
- 2002 – Skeppsholmen (TV drama) (Director: 10 episodes)
- 2004 – Allrams höjdarpaket (Allram's Top-Notch Parcel) (TV Christmas calendar) (Director: 11 episodes)
- 2005 – Coachen (TV thriller) (3 episodes)
- 2007 – En riktig jul (A Real Christmas) (TV Christmas calendar), 24 episodes
- 2007 – Höök (TV thriller) (Ep. 10-12) ("Beskyddarna")
- 2009 – De halvt dolda (TV drama) (4 episodes)
- 2011 – Stockholm Östra
- 2012 – Don't Ever Wipe Tears Without Gloves (TV drama)
- 2015 – Life in Squares (TV drama) (BBC)
- 2017 - Innan vi dör (TV Thriller)
- 2018 – Spinning Man (film)
- 2019 – Innan vi Dör (TV Thriller)
- 2023 – Ride Out (TV series), (5 episodes)
