= Nina Zanjani =

Swedish actress

Nina Zanjani Persian: نینا زنجانی
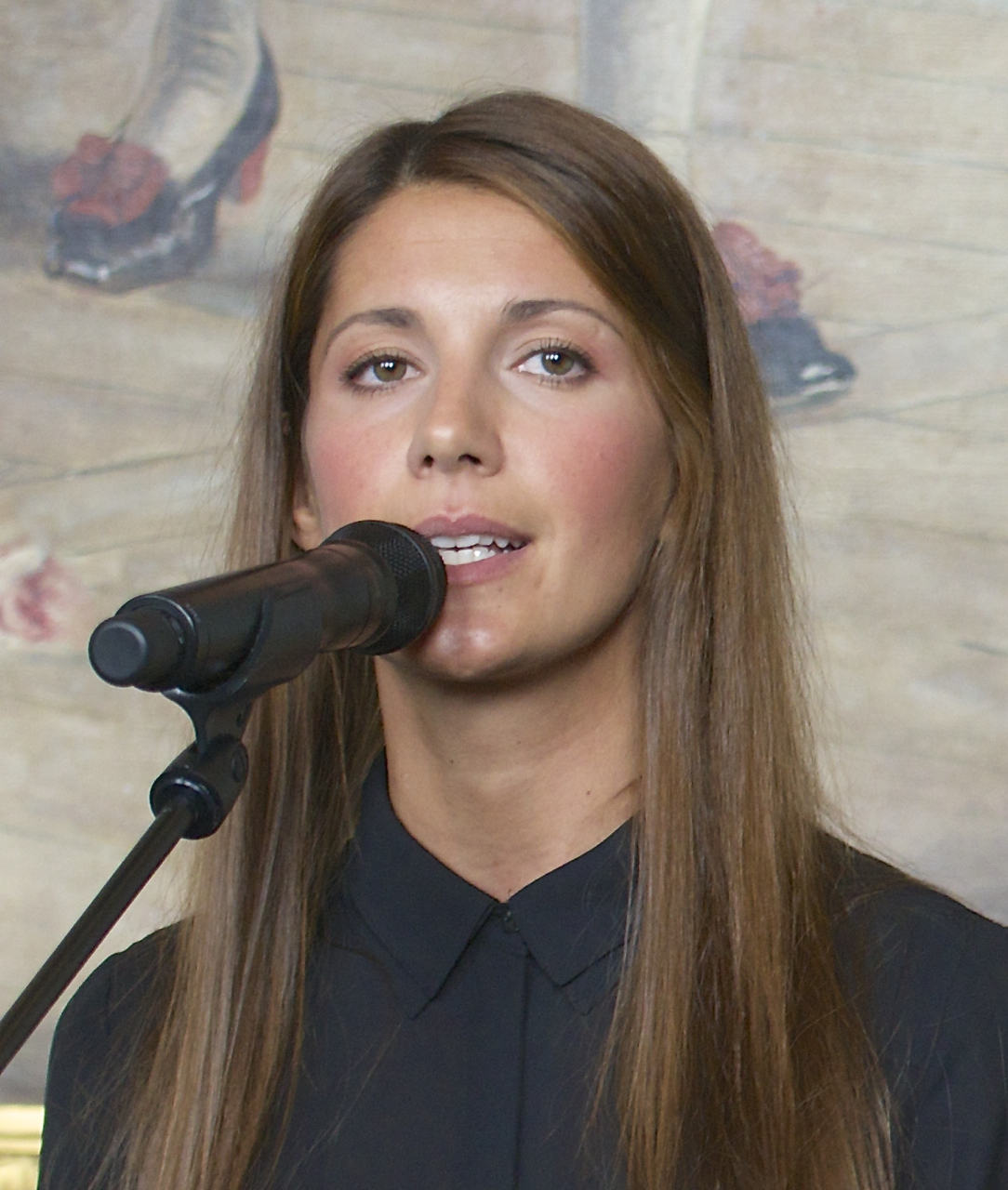
- Nina Zanjani during the 2014 Royal Dramatic Theatre autumn gathering.
- Born: 1981 (age 44–45); Tehran, Iran
- Occupation: Actress
- Years active: 2006–present

Nina Nasr Zanjani (born 1981) is a Swedish actress. She played one of the two lead roles in Helena Bergström's directorial debut Mind the Gap as the daughter Yasmin.

== Early life ==
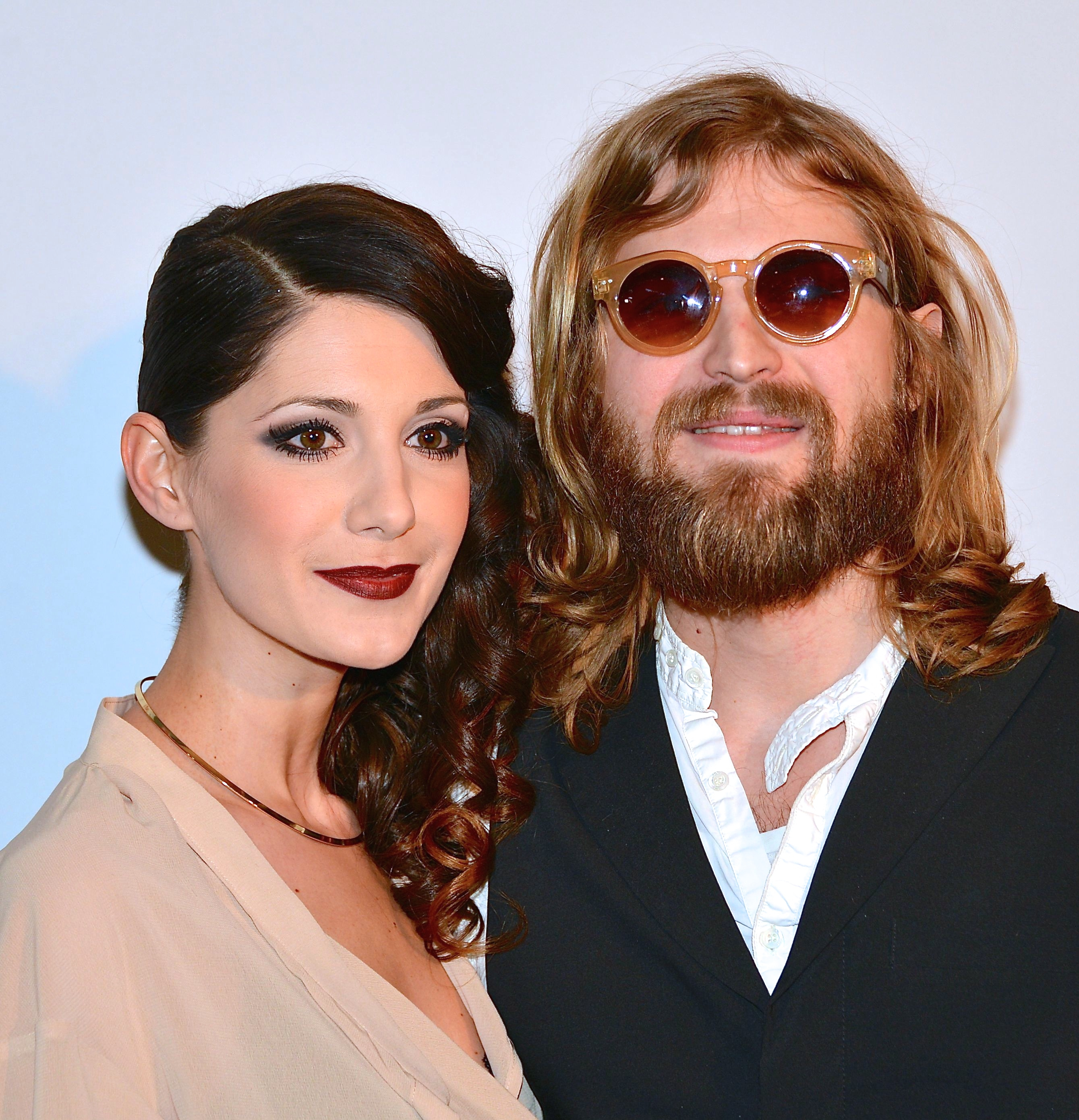
Nina Zanjani and Joel Magnusson

Zanjani was born in 1981 in Tehran, Iran. When she was six or seven years old, her family moved from Iran to Sweden. She grew up in Gråbo and lived there with her parents and brother. When she was 19-20, she settled in Stockholm to follow her career but now she lives in Gothenburg.

Zanjani was a student at Stockholm Elementary Theatre School (SET) from 2001 to 2002. She graduated from the Swedish National Academy of Mime and Acting in 2007. She participated in the sets of Royal Dramatic Theatre in Party and Woyzeck, and she played Josie in the Backa Theatre's acclaimed set of Rona Munro's Iron in 2005.

== Career ==
Her first acting role was in Helena Bergström's 2007 film Mind the Gap. In November 2007, the play Don Carlos premiered at the Gothenburg City Theatre, where Zanjani played Queen Elizabeth. She also appeared in Night Rider by Björn Runge in the same theater, and in Nathan the Wise at the Stockholm City Theater and the SVT's dramatization of Selma Lagerlöf, which was aired on 26 and 27 December 2008.

Zanjani also had a starring role in Josef Fares' movie Balls (Swedish: Farsan) which premiered in February 2010. She also starred in all episodes of the second Swedish series of Wallander, where she played the role of police woman Isabelle Melin, at least until Indrivaren, where she ends her employment with the Ystad police.

She was featured in the short film Knullträdet.

In autumn 2010, she played the lead, titular role in Clara's journey at the City Theatre in Gothenburg. Zanjani, along with playwright Christina Ouzounidis and director Mellika Melouani were praised for their involvement in the project. All three were nominated for Swedish Theatre Critics Awards.

In 2012, she participated in the Gothenburg City Theatre's production of The Bible In 2014 she performed the role of Eliza in George Bernard Shaw's Pygmalion at the Gothenburg City Theatre.

== Filmography ==
- 2006 - Paketet
- 2007 - Mind the Gap
- 2008 - Selma
- 2009 - Wallander – Hämnden
- 2009 - Wallander – Skulden
- 2009 - Wallander – Kuriren
- 2009 - Wallander – Tjuven
- 2009 - Wallander – Cellisten
- 2009 - Wallander – Prästen
- 2009 - Wallander – Läckan
- 2009 - Wallander – Skytten
- 2010 - Wallander – Dödsängeln
- 2010 - Balls
- 2010 - Wallander – Vålnaden
- 2010 - Wallander – Arvet
- 2010 - Wallander – Indrivaren
- 2010 - Superhjälten (The Superhero)
- 2010 - Home for Christmas
- 2011 - Elegia
- 2013 - Hotell
- 2013 - Barna Hedenhös uppfinner julen (TV series)
- 2020 - Agent Hamilton (TV series)

== Theatre ==
=== Roles ===
Year	Role	Production	Director	Theater
2015	Hedda Tesman	Hedda Gabler; Henrik Ibsen	Emil Graffman	Gothenburg City Theatre

== See also ==
- List of Iranian actresses
