= Against the Ice =

2022 film by Peter Flinth

- Release poster
- Directed by: Peter Flinth
- Screenplay by: Nikolaj Coster-Waldau; Joe Derrick
- Based on: Two Against the Ice by Ejnar Mikkelsen
- Produced by: Baltasar Kormákur
- Starring: Nikolaj Coster-Waldau; Joe Cole; Charles Dance; Heida Reed
- Cinematography: Torben Forsberg
- Edited by: Morten Højbjerg
- Music by: Volker Bertelmann
- Production companies: RVK Studios; Ill Kippers Productions
- Distributed by: Netflix
- Release dates: February 15, 2022 (Berlinale); March 2, 2022 (Netflix)
- Running time: 102 minutes
- Countries: Iceland; Denmark
- Language: English

Against the Ice is a 2022 historical survival film directed by Peter Flinth and written by Nikolaj Coster-Waldau and Joe Derrick, based on the true story recounted in Two Against the Ice by Ejnar Mikkelsen. It stars Coster-Waldau, Joe Cole, Charles Dance, and Heida Reed. The film was shot in Iceland and Greenland. Against the Ice premiered at the 72nd Berlin International Film Festival on February 15, 2022. It was released on Netflix on March 2, 2022, and received mixed reviews from critics.

== Plot ==
In 1909, Danish explorer Captain Ejnar Mikkelsen organizes an expedition to Shannon Island, East Greenland, from which he makes treks to recover the records of the ill-fated Denmark expedition. His first attempt is unsuccessful and a crewman loses toes to frostbite in the process, but on the trek Mikkelsen discovers a dead Denmark expedition member with a log and a map showing the location of a cairn built by his expedition. The only volunteer to accompany Mikkelsen on his second attempt is an inexperienced engineer named Iver Iversen, while the rest of the crew stays behind.

Mikkelsen and Iversen lose two of their sled dogs in their first few days and gradually sacrifice the remaining dogs to provide food to the teams that remain. Later, they fight and kill a polar bear. After three months the explorers locate the cairn, which contains records that disprove the existence of the Peary Channel, thus showing that Greenland is a single island and that the United States has no claim in the Arctic. On their way back, Mikkelsen fears that they may not survive, so they build another cairn about 200 miles from Shannon Island in which they deposit the records from the Denmark expedition. Mikkelsen and Iversen finally return to Shannon Island to learn the rest of the crew have returned home, leaving them stranded. They are forced to spend two winters in a cabin with food and supplies while their crewmates struggle to mount a rescue mission.

During their long isolation, the two men return to the cairn they built and retrieve the records. Meanwhile, their cabin is visited by would-be rescuers who find no sign of them. Later Mikkelsen hallucinates that his lover Naja Holm is with him, while Iversen imagines meeting his grandfather. Mikkelsen nearly kills Iversen with a rifle and the two men come very close to losing their sanity before being rescued in 1912. Their evidence from the Denmark expedition leads to American recognition of Greenland as a single island belonging to Denmark. An epilogue reveals that Mikkelsen married Naja a year later, that Iversen never set foot in the Arctic again, and that the two men remained friends for life.

== Cast ==
- Nikolaj Coster-Waldau as Ejnar Mikkelsen
- Joe Cole as Iver P. Iversen
- Charles Dance as Minister Niels Neergaard
- Heida Reed as Naja Holm
- Gísli Örn Garðarsson as Christian Herman Jørgensen
- Sam Redford as Lt. Vilhelm Laub
- Ed Speleers as Hans Peter Olsen (later Bessel)
- Þorsteinn Bachmann as Georg Carl Amdrup
- Diarmaid Murtagh as Georg Poulsen
- Frankie Wilson as Carl Unger

== Production ==
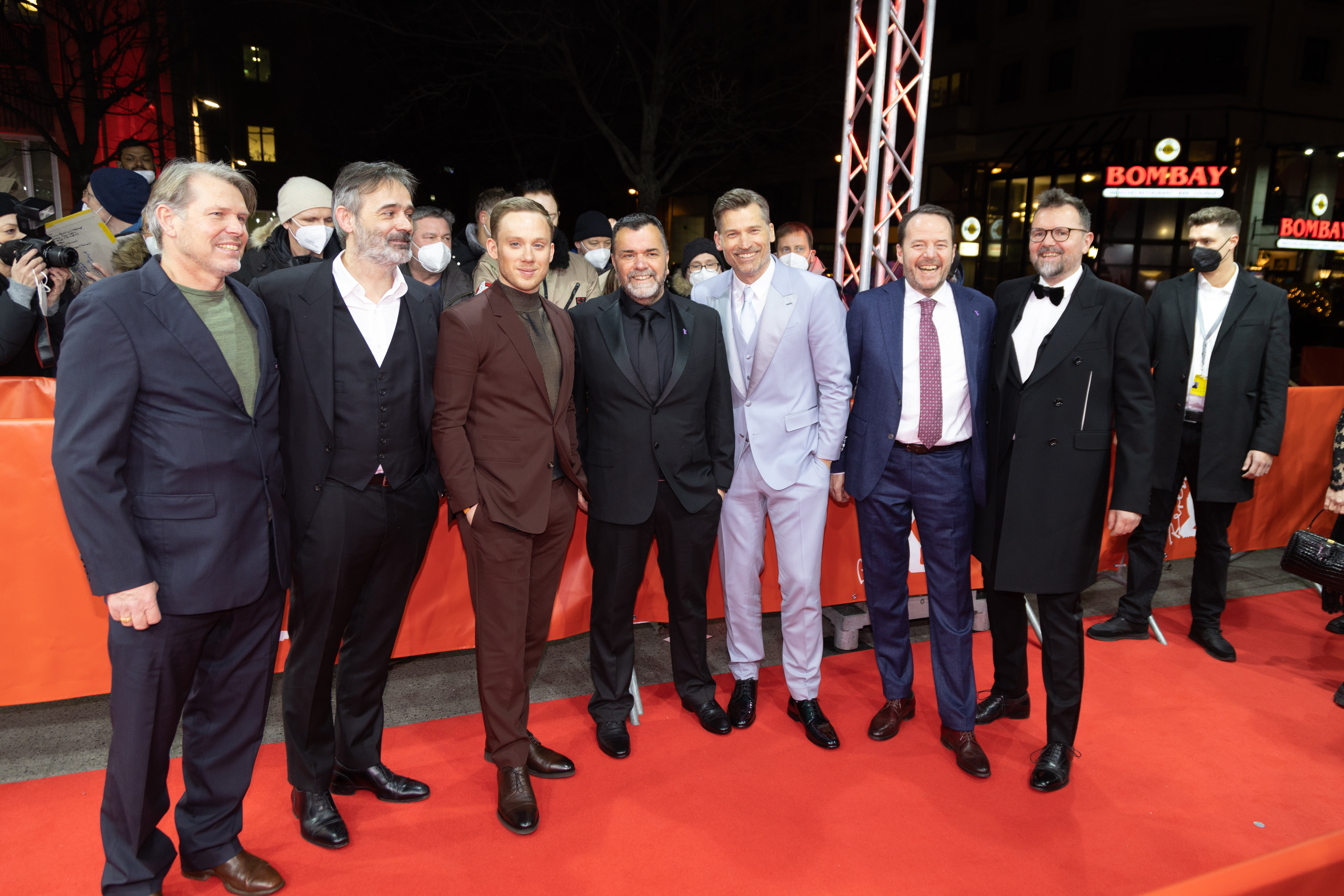
The cast and crew at the 72nd Berlin International Film Festival.

Against the Ice was a co-production between RVK Studios and Ill Kippers. It was directed by Danish director Peter Flinth, who worked with producer Baltasar Kormákur and cinematographer Torben Forsberg to shoot the film on location in Iceland and Greenland whilst using minimal green screens. The film is based on the Danish book Two Against the Ice by Ejnar Mikkelsen. On January 19, 2021, Nikolaj Coster-Waldau, Joe Cole, Charles Dance, and Heida Reed were confirmed to star. Flinth said he cast Cole as inexperienced crew member Iver Iversen due to the actor's unfamiliarity with Greenland. According to Coster-Waldau, the crew was once stranded on a glacier in Iceland during a storm. The actor suffered a concussion while filming the bear-fighting scene, which was shot using computer-generated imagery (CGI) and a heavyweight judo champion as a stuntman. Flinth had originally wanted to film the scene using a real polar bear.

== Reception ==
=== Audience viewership ===
The film was watched for 30.73 million hours in its first five days, placing second on Netflix's top ten. From March 7 to March 13, the film was watched for 12.73 million hours, finishing third on the charts.

=== Critical response ===
On the review aggregator website Rotten Tomatoes, 57% of 35 critics' reviews are positive, with an average rating of 6.1/10. The website's consensus reads: "Against the Ice isn't the most original or exciting wilderness thriller, but viewers in search of man-versus-nature entertainment could easily do worse." Metacritic, which uses a weighted average, assigned the film a score of 49 out of 100, based on 14 critics, indicating "mixed or average" reviews.

Though the performances and cinematography received some praise, critics generally criticized the runtime, characters, dialogue, score, and historical accuracy. The Hollywood Reporter's David Rooney writes, "In the end, the most remarkable thing about Against the Ice is that a real-life story of two men at the mercy of the unforgiving elements, of hunger and illness, possible attack and encroaching madness, can be so curiously deprived of tension." The Times' Ed Potton praised Coster-Waldau's performance.
