= Anita Wall =

Swedish actress (born 1940)

- Born: Kerstin Anita Wall; 11 July 1940 (age 85); Stockholm, Sweden
- Occupation: Actress
- Spouse: Lars Lind (m. 2007)

Kerstin Anita Wall (born 11 July 1940), is a Swedish stage and film actress.

== Biography ==
She began acting at eleven years of age at Vår teater, a children's theatre, playing Pippi Longstocking and other roles.

From 1958 to 1959, she was employed by the National Swedish Touring Theatre and toured with it before joining the Royal Dramatic Training Academy, where she was one of the last group of students from 1962 to 1965 before its change of name to Statens Scenskola, together with Lars Amble, Börje Ahlstedt, Evabritt Strandberg, Per Ragnar, and others.

Since 1965, Wall has appeared in a wide range of productions at the Royal Dramatic Theatre, including Pinocchio in 1966, The Misanthrope in 1970, Miss Margarida's Way in 1976 (also on TV in 1985), Demons in 1977, Richard III in 1980 and The Servant of Two Masters in 1982. She played the title role in August Strindberg's drama Kristina in 1985. Wall made her film debut in 1959 in Raggare!.

At times she has been on leave from the Royal Dramatic Theatre to work on other stages; these include Edit – Tummelisas mamma at Teater Brunnsgatan Fyra, the revue Helga Vrede at Vasateatern and Mitt dubbla liv with the National Swedish Touring Theatre.

Wall has skillfully alternated between dramatic and humorous roles; many remember her as the maid in the 1978 TV version of the comedy Grabbarna i 57:an eller Musikaliska gänget with Sune Mangs and Bert-Åke Varg. In TV theatre she has acted in Chekhov's The Bear and Svenska folkets sex och snusk by Allan Edwall. She played the intriguing and elegant businesswoman Elisabeth Lerwacht in the soap opera Rederiet from 1992 to 1994.

In January 2018, Wall was one of the recipients of the Guldbagge Awards for Film of the Year at the 53rd Guldbagge Awards along with Inga Landgré and Lena Söderblom.

She has been married to actor Lars Lind since 2007.

In 2013, she appeared in Crimes of Passion.

== Awards ==
- 2001 – Litteris et Artibus
- 2008 – Eugene O'Neill Award
- 2008 – The Penguin Award from the Elsa Olenius society for exceptional work in the field of children and youth culture
- 2015 – Guldbagge Award for Best Supporting Actress for the role of Frida in the film Hemma

== Selected filmography ==
- Sten Stensson Returns (1963)
- Friends (1988)
- 1939 (1989)
- Balls (2010)
- Home (2013)
