= Kjell-Åke Andersson =

Swedish director and screenwriter (born 1949)

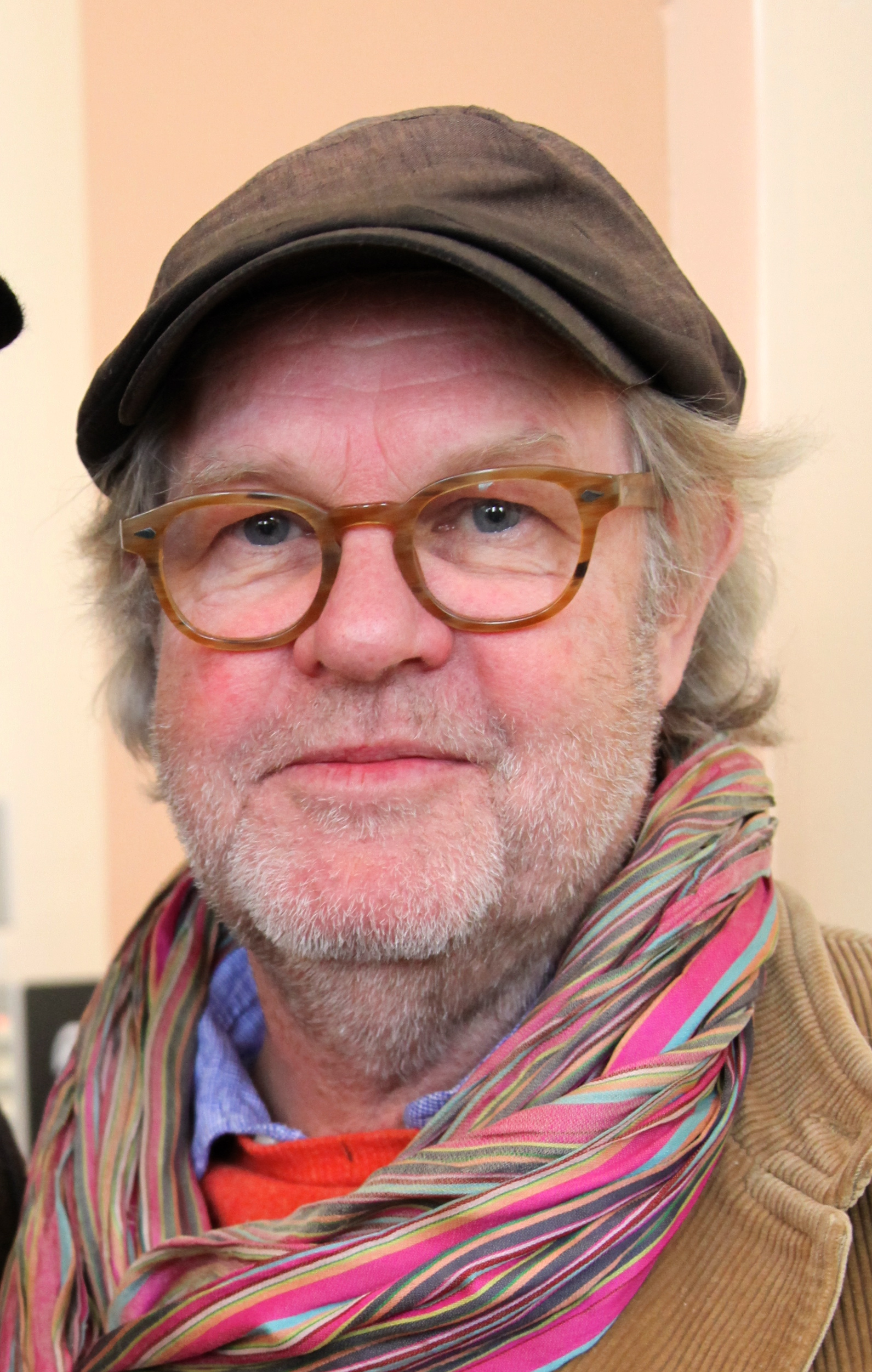
- Andersson in 2012
- Born: Kjell-Åke Gunnar Andersson; 17 June 1949 (age 75); Malmö, Sweden
- Occupations: Director; screenwriter; cinematographer
- Years active: 1980–present

Kjell-Åke Gunnar Andersson (born 7 June 1949) is a Swedish director, screenwriter, and cinematographer from Malmö. His 1992 film, Night of the Orangutan, was nominated for Best Film, Best Director, and Best Screenplay at the 28th Guldbagge Awards.

== Selected filmography ==
- Vi hade i alla fall tur med vädret – screenwriter and cinematographer (1980)
- Friends (1988)
- Night of the Orangutan (1992)
- Juloratoriet – director and screenwriter (1996)
- Familjehemligheter – director and screenwriter (2001)
- Stackars Tom – director (2002)
- Mamma pappa barn – director (2003)
- Wallander: Innan frosten – director (2005)
- Vi hade i alla fall tur med vädret – igen (2008)
- The Truth Will Out – director (2018)
