= Lennart Jähkel =

Swedish actor

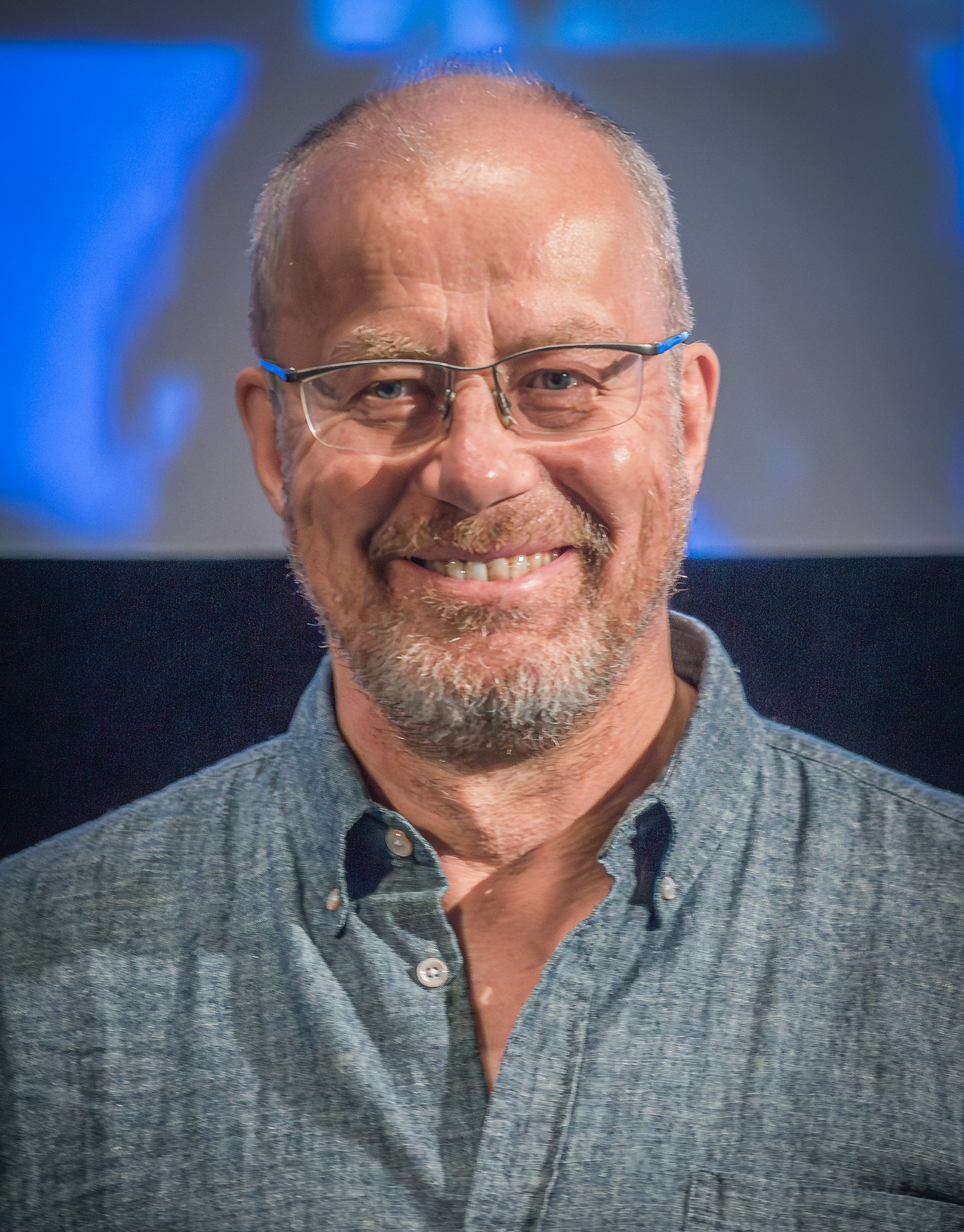
- Jähkel in 2015
- Born: Carl Gustav Lennart Jähkel; 27 September 1956 (age 69); Piteå, Sweden
- Occupation: Actor
- Years active: 1985–present

Carl Gustav Lennart Jähkel (born 27 September 1956) is a Swedish actor. He is active at the Stockholm City Theatre, where he is a member of the permanent ensemble.

He was born on 27 September 1956 in Piteå. His grandfather was a German immigrant. He attended the Malmö Theatre Academy.

In 2019, he appeared in the third season of Playa del Sol as Lelle, an outspoken bartender.

== Filmography ==
=== Films ===
- 1991 - Infödingen
- 1992 - Nordexpressen
- 1992 - Ha ett underbart liv
- 1996 - The Hunters
- 1997 - Under ytan
- 2001 - Pusselbitar
- 2002 - Suxxess
- 2002 - Utanför din dörr
- 2003 - Psalmer från köket
- 2003 - Laura Trenter Presenterar - Hjälp!Rånare!
- 2004 - As It Is in Heaven
- 2004 - Populärmusik från Vittula
- 2006 - Boog och Elliot (voice)
- 2005 - Pistvakt
- 2005 - Sex, hopp & kärlek
- 2007 - Sara & Draken
- 2015 - Granny's Dancing on the Table

=== Television ===
- 1987 - Goda grannar
- 1992 - Ronny och Ragge
- 1998 - Pistvakt – En vintersaga
- 1998–2004 - C/o Segemyhr
- 2000 - Pistvakt – Andra vintern
- 2001 - Pusselbitar
- 2002 - Talismanen
- 2002 - Hjälp! Rånare!
- 2007 - The Truth About Marika
- 2007 - En riktig jul
- 2008 - Sjön suger
- 2019 - Playa del Sol
