= Lena Strömdahl =

Swedish actress (born 1947)

Lena Strömdahl (born 1947 in Lidingö, Sweden) is a Swedish actress.

She appeared in a children's theatre production of Titta Hamlet at the Orion Theatre in 2023.

== Filmography ==
=== Film ===
- Werther (1990) - Martha
- Honungsvargar (1990) - Festdeltagare
- T. Sventon och fallet Isabella (1991) - Miss Rita Gustavsson-Rinaldo
- Hammar (1992) - Dr. Morell
- Night of the Orangutan (1992) - Aunt
- Där regnbågen slutar (1999) - Sköterskan
- Percy, Buffalo Bill och jag (2005) - Farmor
- Järnets änglar (2007) - Social assistant
- Rallybrudar (2008) - Husmor
- Göta kanal 3: Kanalkungens hemlighet (2009) - Kvinnlig arkivarie
- The Girl with the Dragon Tattoo (2011) - Mildred
- Miraklet i Viskan (2015) - Anny

=== Television ===
- Babels hus (1981) - Night nurse
- Hassel: Utpressarna (1992, TV Movie) - Louise Edberg
- Rederiet (1992-1996) - Yvonne Almkvist-Dahlén-Bjurhed
- Woman with Birthmark (2001)
- Pusselbitar (2001) - Logoped
- Wallander (2005) - Maj Nilsson
- Kommissionen (2005) - Monika, socialminister
