= Night of the Orangutan =

1992 film

- Directed by: Kjell-Åke Andersson
- Written by: Kjell-Åke Andersson; Magnus Nilsson
- Produced by: Anders Granström; Bert Sundberg
- Starring: Nick Börjlind
- Cinematography: Per Källberg
- Release date: 23 November 1992
- Running time: 102 minutes
- Country: Sweden
- Language: Swedish

Night of the Orangutan (Swedish: Min store tjocke far) is a 1992 Swedish drama film directed by Kjell-Åke Andersson. Rolf Lassgård won the award for Best Actor at the 28th Guldbagge Awards. The film was also nominated for Best Film, Best Director and Best Screenplay.

== Cast ==
- Nick Börjlind as Osvald Nilsson
- Rolf Lassgård as Fritz Algot 'Tjaffo' Nilsson
- Ann Petrén as Victoria Nilsson
- Gunilla Röör as Birgitta
- Krister Henriksson as Bertil
- Halvar Björk as Sunden
- Lena Strömdahl as Aunt
- Jimmy Almström as Läppen
- Yvonne Schaloske as Puddingen
- Bertil Norström as Erik Davidsson
- Wallis Grahn as Rut Davidsson
- Tomas Norström as Vicar
- Leif Andrée as Hogga
