= En riktig jul =

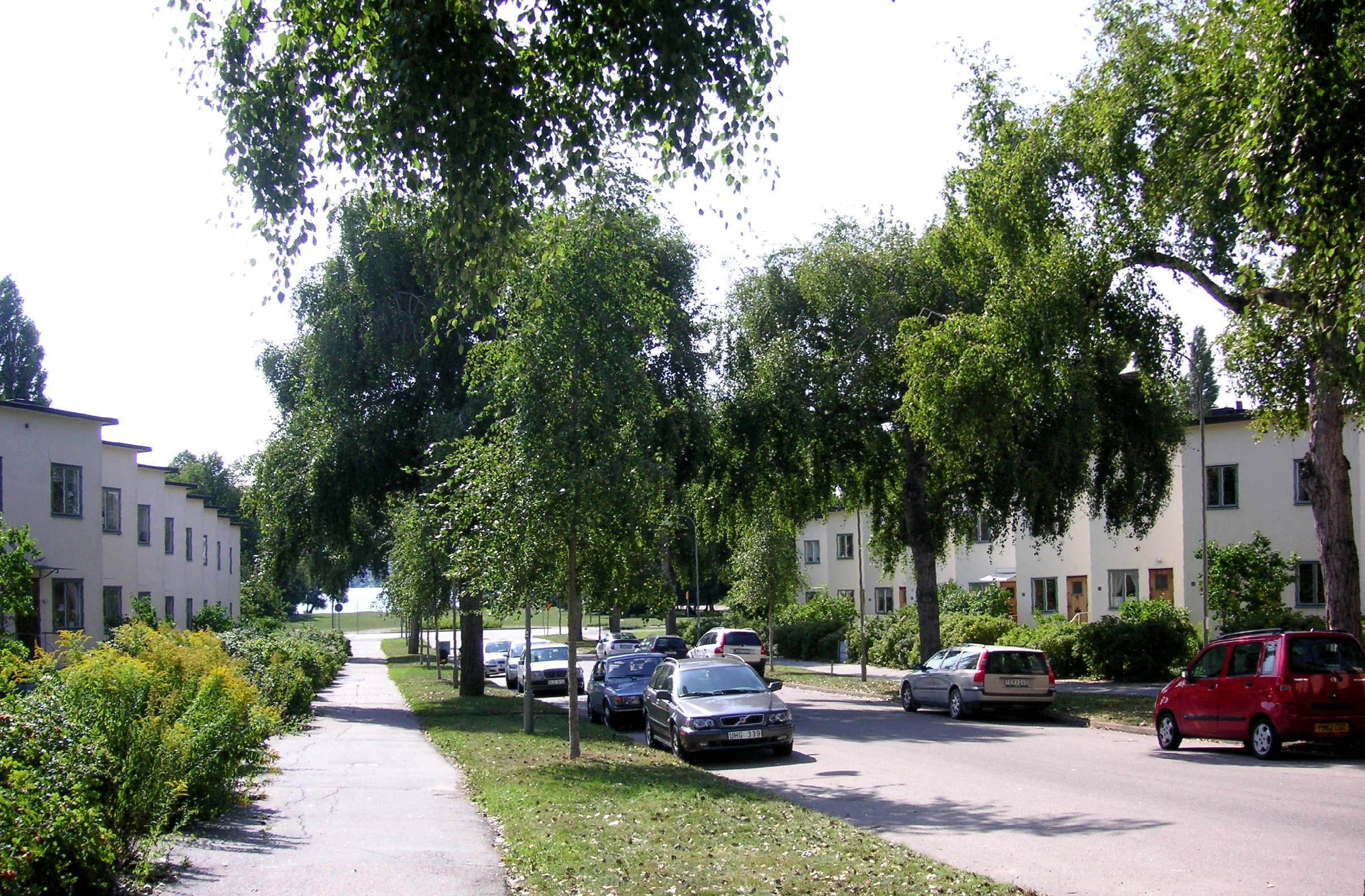
- Ålstensgatan ("Ålsten Street") in the summer of 2007.
- Genre: children
- Country of origin: Sweden
- Original language: Swedish
- No. of seasons: 1
- No. of episodes: 24

Production
- Production company: SVT

Original release
- Network: SVT1; SVT B SVT HD
- Release: 1 December – 24 December 2007

Related
- LasseMajas detektivbyrå (2006); Skägget i brevlådan (2008)

En riktig jul ("A Real Christmas") is the 2007 Sveriges Television's Christmas calendar, broadcast by Sveriges Television (SVT).

The TV series was produced in January–March 2007. It was recorded at Ålstensgatan ("Ålsten Street") in Ålsten, Stockholm Municipality and at Årsta torg in Årsta, southern Stockholm. It was also recorded in studio until June.

It was directed by Simon Kaijser da Silva and written by Pernilla Oljelund and Hans Rosenfeldt.

== Plot ==
Mila is a 10-year-old girl who lives with her mother Katerina, who likes the neighbour Klas, but Mila doesn't like him and wants "En riktig jul" ("A Real Christmas") only with her and Katerina. She writes "En riktig jul" on a wish list to Father Christmas. Then the "tomtenissa" Elfrid comes for helping her.

== Cast ==
- Olivia Nystedt as Mila
- Vanna Rosenberg as Katerina, Mila's mother
- Allan Svensson as Father Christmas
- Suzanne Ernrup as Elfrid
- Kalle Westerdahl as Klas
- Dexter Dillén-Pardon as Jocke, Klas' son
- Johan Ulveson as Pascal Petersén
- Jessica Zandén as television chief
- Viktor Källander as Einar
- Sissela Kyle as Ettan Nilsson
- Lennart Jähkel as Polar bear
- Emil Almén as Tekniknisse
- Anna Sahlin
- Shebly Niavarani as Frasse
- Joakim Lindblad as Policeman
