= Stjärnorna på slottet =

Swedish television programme

- Genre: reality
- Country of origin: Sweden
- Original language: Swedish

Original release
- Network: SVT1
- Release: 1 January 2006

Stjärnorna på slottet (English: Stars at the Castle) is a Swedish show featuring five film or music stars which is usually broadcast during the Christmas and New Year Eve weekend and a bit into January each year. The show was broadcast for the first time in January 2006 on SVT. The show has received a lot of attention in media and has had high ratings. The show has been filmed at several castles over the years, including Trolleholm Castle in Scania (2005 and 2007), Häckeberga Castle in Scania (2008), Thorskog House in Bohuslän (2009 and 2010), Görväln House in Uppland (2011), Bäckaskog Castle in Scania (2012–2013), Bjärsjölagård Castle in Scania (2014) and Ericsberg Palace in Södermanland (2015).

The show basis is that five famous people live together in a castle for five days. Each person has one day that focuses on them and their career, they eat dinners where they discuss the individual. In 2008 the show won "Entertainment show of the year" at Kristallen.

== Seasons ==
=== Season 1 ===
Recorded at Trolleholm Castle in Scania in the late summer of 2005.

- Maud Adams
- Börje Ahlstedt
- Peter Harryson
- Mona Malm
- Sven-Bertil Taube

=== Season 2 ===
Recorded at Trolleholm Castle in the late summer of 2007.

- Britt Ekland
- Magnus Härenstam
- Jan Malmsjö
- Arja Saijonmaa
- Peter Stormare

=== Season 3 ===
Recorded at Häckeberga Castle in Scania, 3–9 August 2008.

- Janne "Loffe" Carlsson
- Kjerstin Dellert
- Jonas Gardell
- Staffan Scheja
- Christina Schollin

=== Season 4 ===
Recorded at Thorskog House in Bohuslän, 23–29 July 2009.

- Kjell Bergqvist
- Tommy Körberg
- Siw Malmkvist
- Björn Ranelid
- Meg Westergren

=== Season 5 ===
Recorded at Thorskog House, 8–13 July 2010.

- Ulf Brunnberg
- Monica Dominique
- Dan Ekborg
- Marie Göranzon
- Niklas Strömstedt

=== Season 6 ===
Recorded at Görväln House in Uppland in August 2011. Louise Hoffsten replaced Maria Lundqvist who could not attend.

- Kim Anderzon
- Louise Hoffsten
- Christer Lindarw
- Johan Rabaeus
- Johan Rheborg

=== Season 7 ===
Recorded at Bäckaskog Castle in Scania in the summer of 2012.

- Ewa Fröling
- Robert Gustafsson
- Claes Malmberg
- Barbro "Lill-Babs" Svensson
- Philip Zandén

=== Season 8 ===
Recorded at Bäckaskog Castle in the Summer of 2013.

- Leif Andrée
- Malena Ernman
- Maria Lundqvist
- Claes Månsson
- Lasse Åberg

=== Season 9 ===
Recorded at Bjärsjölagård Castle in Scania in the Summer of 2014.

- Harriet Andersson
- Helena Bergström
- Özz Nûjen
- Örjan Ramberg
- Rikard Wolff

=== Season 10 ===
Recorded at Ericsberg Palace in Södermanland in the Summer of 2015. This is the first season that three women and two men will participate instead of the opposite like in earlier seasons.

- Marika Lagercrantz
- Morgan Alling
- Claire Wikholm
- Stefan Sauk
- Amanda Ooms

=== Season 11 ===
Took place at Ericsbergs Palace in Södermanland in Katrineholm during the summer of 2016.

- Magnus Uggla
- Lia Boysen
- Gunnel Fred
- Johannes Brost
- Sofia Ledarp

=== Season 12 ===
Took place at Teleborg Castle in Växjö in August 2017.

- Peter Jöback
- Ann-Louise Hanson
- Bosse Parnevik
- Marianne Mörck
- Regina Lund
