= Two Against the Ice =

Arctic expedition book

- Author: Ejnar Mikkelsen
- Genre: Non-fiction
- Publisher: Rupert Hart-Davis
- English publication date: 1957

Two Against the Ice is a non-fiction book authored by Danish explorer Ejnar Mikkelsen. The book details the author's exploration into Greenland, a journey made with his compatriot Iver P. Iversen in 1910. The book was originally published in Danish (1955) and later translated into English by Maurice Michael (first published in 1957).

== Summary ==
Mikkelsen recounts his round-trip 2,500 mile sledge journey from Shannon Island to Danmark Fjord. A task which soon became a battle for survival as rations ran low, and the sled dogs began to starve to death, or were intentionally shot in order to provide food for the other dogs. The two adventurers became so hungry that they began to hallucinate. In a notable moment that typifies the hunger pangs that the men were suffering, Iversen no longer wished to carry his rifle out of a fear he may be compelled to shoot Mikkelsen.

The purpose of their travels was to locate the maps and journals of previous explorer Mylius Erichsen of the ill-fated Denmark Expedition. They found these articles in a cairn. Taking the journals with them they eventually made it back to their ship, only to find it crushed in pack ice, and with no sign of the other members of their expedition. The pair waited for two years in a small hut until finally being rescued by a sealing vessel.

== Historical relevance ==
=== Journals ===
The journals that were recovered by Mikkelsen included Brønlund’s diary and Hagen’s cartographic drawings, which helped settle the question of whether Peary Land—a vast area explored by American Robert E. Peary for the first time around 1892—was a peninsula or an island. In showing that it was peninsula, the expedition affirmed Denmark's claim to the land, rather than, potentially, America's.

== Adaptation ==
A film adaptation, Against the Ice, was released on Netflix on March 2, 2022. The film was watched for 30.73 million hours in its first five days, placing second on Netflix's top ten.
