= Ejnar Mikkelsen =

Danish polar explorer (1880–1971)

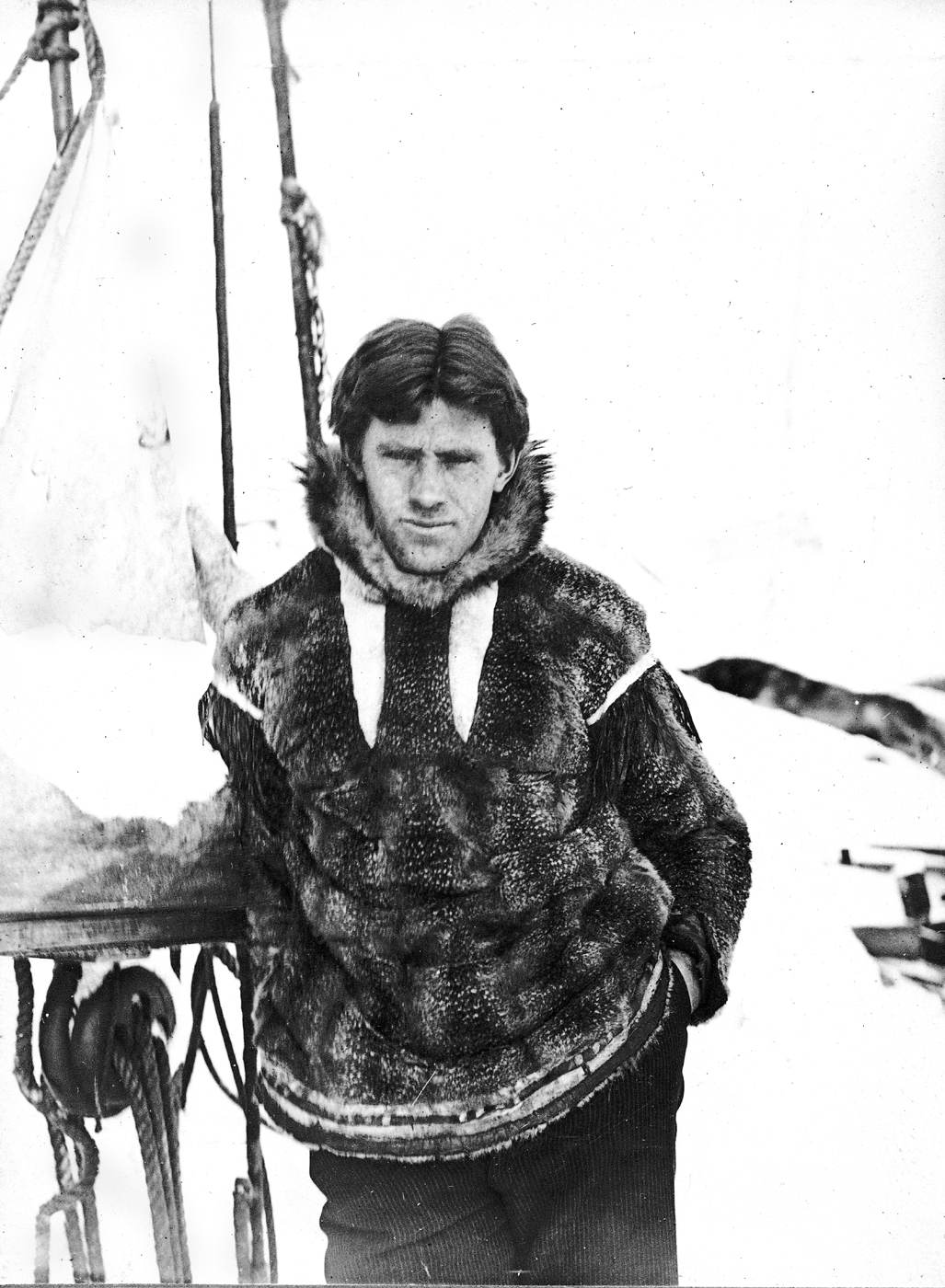
- Mikkelsen in 1907

Royal Inspector of East Greenland
- In office 1933–1950

Personal details
- Born: 23 December 1880 Vester-Brønderslev, Jutland, Denmark
- Died: 1 May 1971 (age 90) Copenhagen, Denmark
- Occupation: Explorer, author, administrator

Ejnar Mikkelsen (23 December 1880 – 1 May 1971) was a Danish polar explorer and writer. He is most known for his expeditions to Greenland.

== Biography ==
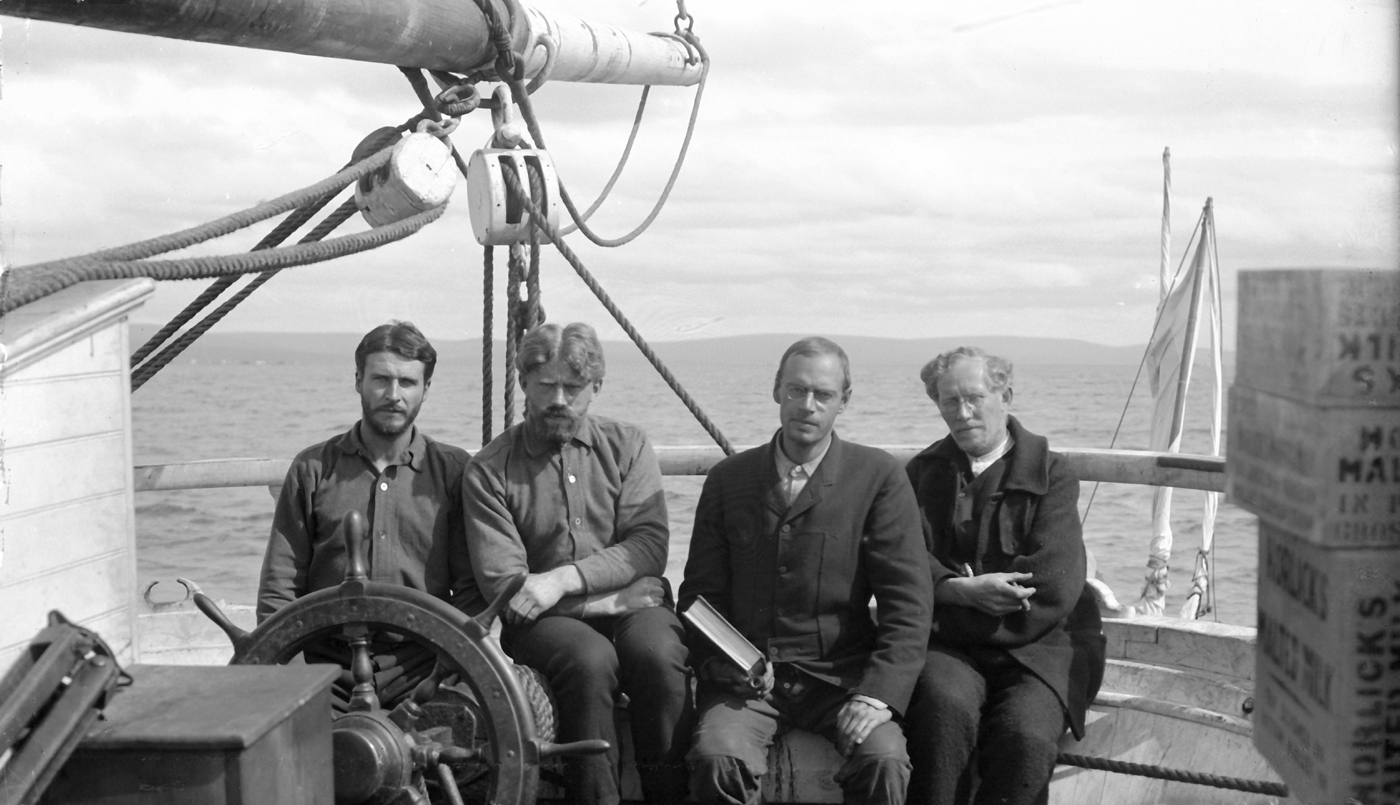
Staff of the Anglo-American Polar Expedition (1906): Ernest de Koven Leffingwell (left), Captain Ejnar Mikkelsen, G.P. Howe, Ejnar Ditlevsen

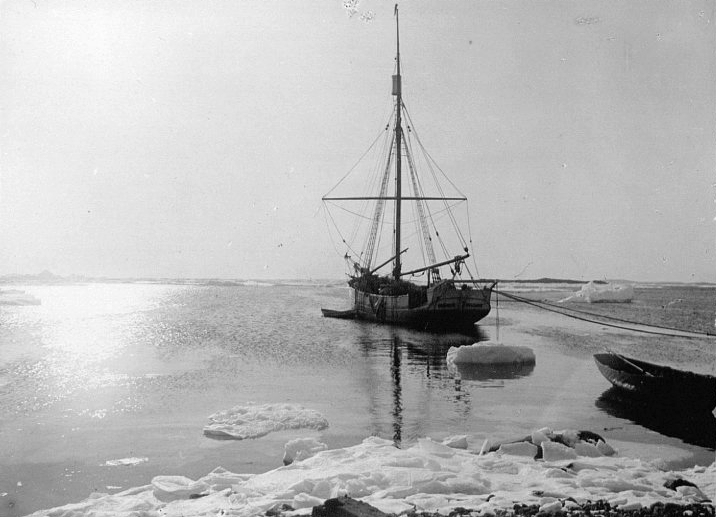
Alabama, the ship of Mikkelsen's 1909 expedition

Mikkelsen was born on 23 December 1880, in Vester Brønderslev, Jutland, the son of Maren Nielsen and educator Aksel Mikkelsen. His siblings included Thorvald Mikkelsen (1885-1962) and author and translator Auslaug Møller.

In 1900, he served in the Georg Carl Amdrup expedition to Christian IX Land in East Greenland. He then served in the Baldwin-Ziegler North Pole Expedition to Franz Joseph Land, which took place from 1900 to 1902.

With Ernest de Koven Leffingwell, he organized the Anglo-American polar expedition which wintered off Flaxman Island, Alaska, in 1906–07. They lost their ship, but in a sledge journey over the ice, they located the continental shelf of the Arctic Ocean, 65 miles (105 km) offshore, where in a span of 2 miles (3.2 km), the sea's depth increased from 50 meters (160 feet) to more than 690 meters (2,260 feet).

Mikkelsen organized an expedition to map the northeast coast of Greenland and to recover the bodies of the ill-fated Denmark expedition leader, Ludvig Mylius-Erichsen, and cartographer, Niels Peter Høeg Hagen, in addition to their records. For this task, Mikkelsen wintered from 1909 to 1910 at Shannon Island. His wooden ship, the Alabama, became trapped in the ice of Shannon Island and, while he was exploring, the rest of the party returned home on a whaler. Remaining with his engineer, Iver Iversen, Mikkelsen succeeded through a series of hazardous sledge journeys. They recovered the lost records in a cairn at the head of Danmark Fjord, discovering that "the Peary Channel does not exist."

Hence, he rebutted the existence of a hypothetical sound or marine channel running from east to west separating Peary Land in northernmost Greenland from the mainland further south.

The two explorers returned to Shannon Island to find the crew gone, but they used salvaged timbers and planking to erect a small cottage. Mikkelsen and Iversen then spent two winters at the cottage before they were rescued, in the direst of extremities, by a Norwegian whaler in the summer of 1912. The so-called Alabama cottage has survived and was photographed during a visit by the Danish Navy inspection ship Ejnar Mikkelsen in September 2010.

In 1924, he led an expedition to settle what later came to be Scoresbysund. In 1932, he led the "Second East-Greenland Expedition of the Scoresbysund Committee" that carried out the first archaeological excavations on the Skaergaard intrusion by the shores of the Kangerlussuaq Fjord.

In 1970, on his 90th birthday, a national tribute was paid to him in Denmark; he died in Copenhagen a few months later on 1 May 1971. In 2009, the Royal Danish Navy named the second Knud Rasmussen class patrol vessel the HDMS Ejnar Mikkelsen. The Ejnar Mikkelsen Range is named after him.

== Works ==
- Conquering the Arctic Ice (London, 1909)
- Lost in the Arctic (1913). Some of his Greenland expeditions are recounted here.
- Mylius-Erichsen's Report on the Non-Existence of Peary's Channel (1913)
- Tre Aar par Grönlands Ostkyst (1914)
- Nord-syd-øst-vest (1917)
- Norden For Lov og Ret, a story (1920)
  - translated as Frozen Justice (1922)
- John Dale, a novel (1921)
- Farlig Tomansfaerd (1955)
  - translated as Two Against the Ice, (1957)

== Awards ==
- 1933 Hans Egede Medal of the Royal Danish Geographical Society.
- 1935 Patron's Medal of the Royal Geographical Society

== In popular culture ==
The film Against the Ice, released on 2 March 2022, depicts Mikkelsen's most famous ordeal. He was portrayed by Nikolaj Coster-Waldau.

== See also ==
- Cartographic expeditions to Greenland
- List of inspectors of Greenland
