= Pistvakt =

- Genre: Situation comedy
- Starring: Lennart Jähkel; Jacob Nordensson; Tomas Norström
- Opening theme: "Blue and alone" by Weeping Willows
- Country of origin: Sweden
- No. of seasons: 2
- No. of episodes: 12

Production
- Running time: 28–29 minutes (per episode)

Original release
- Network: SVT
- Release: January 15, 1998 – November 30, 2000

Pistvakt (English: Piste watch) was a Swedish television series, produced by SVT subdepartment SVT Drama, and aired over SVT1 between 15 January 1998 and 30 November 2000. Season 1 had the subtitle "En vintersaga" (English: A winter's tale) while Season 2 had the subtitle "Den andra vintern" (English: The second winter).

== About the series ==
The series is based on a play by Pistolteatern. It was followed by the film Pistvakt.

== Story ==
The story revolves around three brother ski patrollers: Sven-Erik, Jan-Erik and Olle Marklund. Living and working in the isolated and fictitious village Svartlien, they face the horrors of solitude and dangers of the wild nature. Their father Stor-Erik, missing for decades, is always present as a symbol of perfection and the ultimate idol for the brothers.

The boys' primary tasks are weather reports and the oiling of the ski lift. They go about their job with utter determination and never let anything come between them and the completion of those jobs.

Occasionally, visitors arrive at Svartlien, with the common result that Sven-Erik has to save them from wild animals, avalanches or other dangers. Also living in Svartlien are the boys' mother Gudrun, and her secret admirer Bengt-Hans, owner of Bengt-Hans Bodega.

== Cast ==
- Lennart Jähkel as Sven-Erik Ivar Marklund
- Jacob Nordenson as Jan-Erik Ivar Marklund
- Tomas Norström as Olle Ivar Marklund
- Pierre Lindstedt as Bengt-Hans
- Barbro Oborg as Gudrun
- Carl Magnus Dellow as Yngve
- Margareta Stone as Eva-Lena
- Sten Ljunggren as Stor-Erik

== Template and style ==
Every episode follows quite a strict template. Starting with a voice-over describing the basic plot of the series, the camera pans from a crude model of the mountaintop near the brothers' home to their little house. During the pan, the audience appears for the first (and sometimes only) time in the episode, breaking the fourth wall.

A very common ingredient in the series is Sven-Erik having to be the rescuer of either his brothers or the guests in the village. The series relies heavily on deadpan humour and running gags.

In the end of every episode the brothers perform a dance in Bengt-Hans Bodega, often to the tune of a classic disco song. After the song, Gudrun generally stays in the bodega, talking to Bengt-Hans, a conversation often filled with innuendo. When Gudrun leaves, Bengt-Hans always exclaims "Oh, Gudrun!".

The brothers are by that time in their triple-level bunkbed, where they discuss the events of the day.

The language of the brothers is a fictitious dialect of Swedish, based on northern dialects, but with a number of neologisms added.

== Impact ==
The series was a success and had a follow-up second series, aired in 2000, and a movie (Taglined, roughly translated, "An Albino Western from the White Desert" referring to the snow in the Swedish mountains) in 2005.

== Episodes ==
=== Season 1 ===
1. Lavinbjärn (English: Avalanche Bear) – 15 January 1998
2. Årets vackraste dag (English: The most beautiful day of the year) – 22 January 1998
3. Svartlien 2010 – 29 January 1998
4. Flytande inspektion (English: Floating inspection) – 5 February 1998
5. Doris är död (English: Doris is dead) – 12 February 1998
6. Julafton -73 (English: Christmas Eve -73) – 19 February 1998

=== Season 2 ===
1. Väck inte den bjärv som sover (English: Don't wake up the bear-wolverine who sleeping) – 26 October 2000
2. Besök från Vargvallen (English: Visit from Vargvallen) – 2 November 2000
3. Lusekoftanovan (English: The lusekofta nova) – 9 November 2000
4. Samesilvre i Kinaskreve (English: Sami silver in China Crevasse) – 16 November 2000
5. Personalfestan (English: The staff party) – 23 November 2000
6. Jakten på en dräpare (English: The hunt for a killer) – 30 November 2000
