= Skägget i brevlådan =

- Genre: children
- Written by: Måns Nilsson; Kalle Lind
- Starring: Anders Johansson; Måns Nilsson; Sandra Huldt; Henrik Dorsin
- Theme music composer: Jean-Paul Wall
- Country of origin: Sweden
- Original language: Swedish
- No. of seasons: 1
- No. of episodes: 24

Production
- Executive producers: Martin Persson; Ralf Ivarsson
- Producer: Maria Thörnqvist
- Production companies: Sveriges Television; Anagram Produktion AB; Film i Skåne

Original release
- Network: SVT1; SVT B SVT HD
- Release: 1 December – 24 December 2008

Related
- En riktig jul (2007); Superhjältejul (2009)

Skägget i brevlådan ("The Beard in the Letterbox", also a Swedish idiom for being in trouble) is the Sveriges Television's Christmas calendar in 2008.

== Plot ==
The friends Klas, Lage and Renée are searching for Santa Claus, as Lage managed to send away a wrong-written wishlist.

== Video ==
The series was released to DVD in 2009.
