= Angela Kovács =

Swedish actress (born 1964)

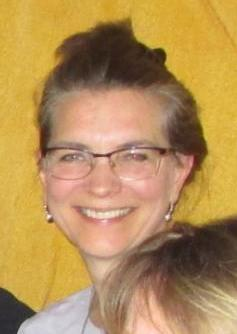
- Kovács in 2016
- Born: May 23, 1964 (age 61)
- Occupation: Actress

Angela Kovács (born 23 May 1964 in Vaksala, Uppland) is a Swedish actress of Hungarian descent.

== Early life and education ==
She was born on 23 May 1964. She studied at the Gothenburg Theatre Academy from 1987 until 1990.

== Career ==
She began her career as a stage actress, working at the Gothenburg City Theatre, the Helsingborg City Theater, and the Royal Dramatic Theatre. She began her film career in 2001 in Hans och hennes by Daniel Lind Lagerlöf. From 2005 to 2007 she played Ann-Britt Höglund in the Wallander series of television films based on the eponymous novels. More recently she has been seen as Irene Huss in a television series by that name based on the novels of Helene Tursten.
