= Rolf Skoglund =

Swedish actor (1940–2022)

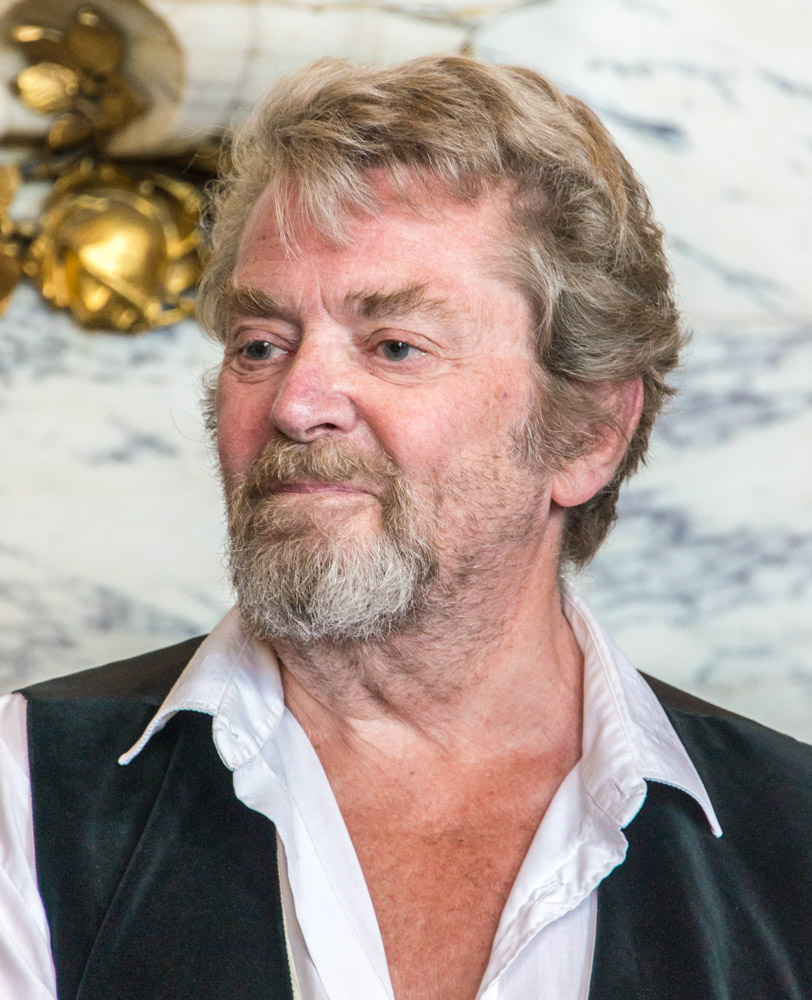
- Skoglund in 2015.
- Born: Rolf Fredrik Skoglund; 11 August 1940; Stockholm, Sweden
- Died: 28 June 2022 (aged 81)
- Occupation: Actor
- Years active: 1963–2021
- Spouse: Gabriella Skoglund (m. 1994)
- Children: 1

Rolf Fredrik Skoglund (11 August 1940 – 28 June 2022) was a Swedish actor. He won the Eugene O'Neill Award in 2007.
