= Douglas Johansson =

Swedish actor (born 1960)

- Born: 1960 (age 65–66); Solna, Sweden

Sten Gunnar Douglas Johansson (born 1960) is a Swedish actor, best known as Jan Martinsson in the films about Kurt Wallander.

He played Tommy in Tic Tac (1997).

== Filmography ==
- 1991 – Hassel – Botgörarna
- 1996 – Jerusalem
- 1997 – Ogifta par
- 1997 – Tic Tac
- 1998 – S:t Mikael (TV)
- 1998 – Beck – Vita nätter
- 2000 – Livet är en schlager
- 2001 – Kaspar i Nudådalen (TV)
- 2004 – The Return of the Dancing Master (TV)
- 2005-2013 – Wallander (TV)
- 2007 – Arn – The Knight Templar
- 2008 – Oskyldigt dömd (TV)
- 2012 – The Impossible
