= Marianne Mörck =

Swedish actress (born 1949)

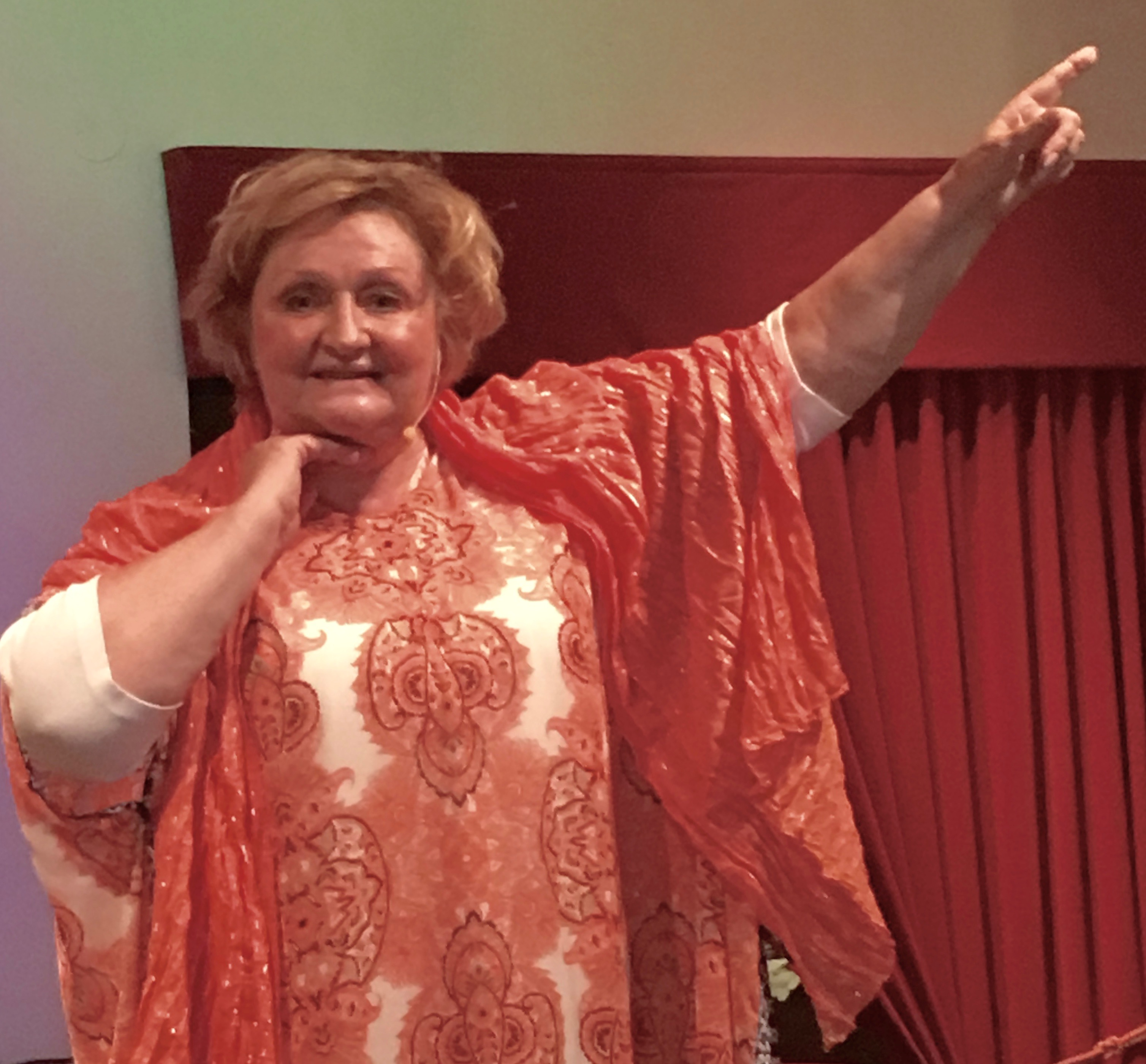
- Marianne Mörck in 2018
- Born: Gun Iris Marianne Mörck; 2 September 1949 (age 77); Gothenburg, Sweden

Gun Iris Marianne Mörck (born 2 September 1949) is a Swedish actress, opera singer and director.

== Biography ==
=== Stage ===
Mörck studied acting at stage school in Gothenburg, and during that time she got involved in choir work for Stora Teatern. She was part of the choir that sang during the opening of Scandinavium arena in 1971. In 1977, Mörck started working at Malmö City Theatre, and she has since been part of over forty plays doing both acting and opera work. She had the titular role in Carmen, Eliza in My Fair Lady, Maja Gräddnos in Pelle Svanslös, Sally Bowles in Cabaret, Madame Thénardier in Les Misérables, Giovanna in Rigoletto and Marta in Sound of Music. Mörck also was the peacock in Tage Danielsson's musical Animalen in 1981, and did the role of Fina-Kajsa in Kristina från Duvemåla in 1995. In 2010, she was part of the musical Romeo & Julia at Göta Lejon in Stockholm.

At the Fredriksdalteatern in Helsingborg Mörck have acted in three theater productions, in 2002 as Agda Lindhagen in Hon jazzade en sommar, in 2008 as Falkenvråk in Rabalder in Ramlösa, and in 2012 as one of the Brewster sisters in Arsenik och gamla spetsar. In 2008, she participated in Arlövs-revue group along with Lasse Brandeby. In 2015, she took part in the Gunnbebo slottsteater production of Charleys tant in the role of Donna Lucia d'Alvadorez.

Mörck was a directors assistant for the scene version of the ABBA musical Mamma Mia! in Stockholm in 2005. Five years later she directed and played in the musical Singin' in the Rain in Malmö. As a director she has worked with theater productions like Shirley Valentine, August Strindberg's Fordringsägare (1993) and Fröken Julie (1997). She has also directed operas like Lucia di Lammermoor, Aida, Eugen Onegin, Don Giovanni, Alceste and Cavalleria Rusticana.

=== Television ===
Mörck's first television work was in the 1982 SVT comedy series Uppåt väggarna. In Melodifestivalen 1988 she was part of the interval act when a part of the play My Fair Lady was acted on stage. She has also acted in TV movies for Wallander, and the Netflix series Bonus Family.

She was a celebrity participant in the twelfth season of Stjärnorna på slottet in 2017; the season was filmed at Teleborg Castle in Växjö.

In 2022, she participated in the second season of Masked Singer Sverige which was broadcast on TV4.
