= Krister Henriksson =

Swedish actor (born 1946)

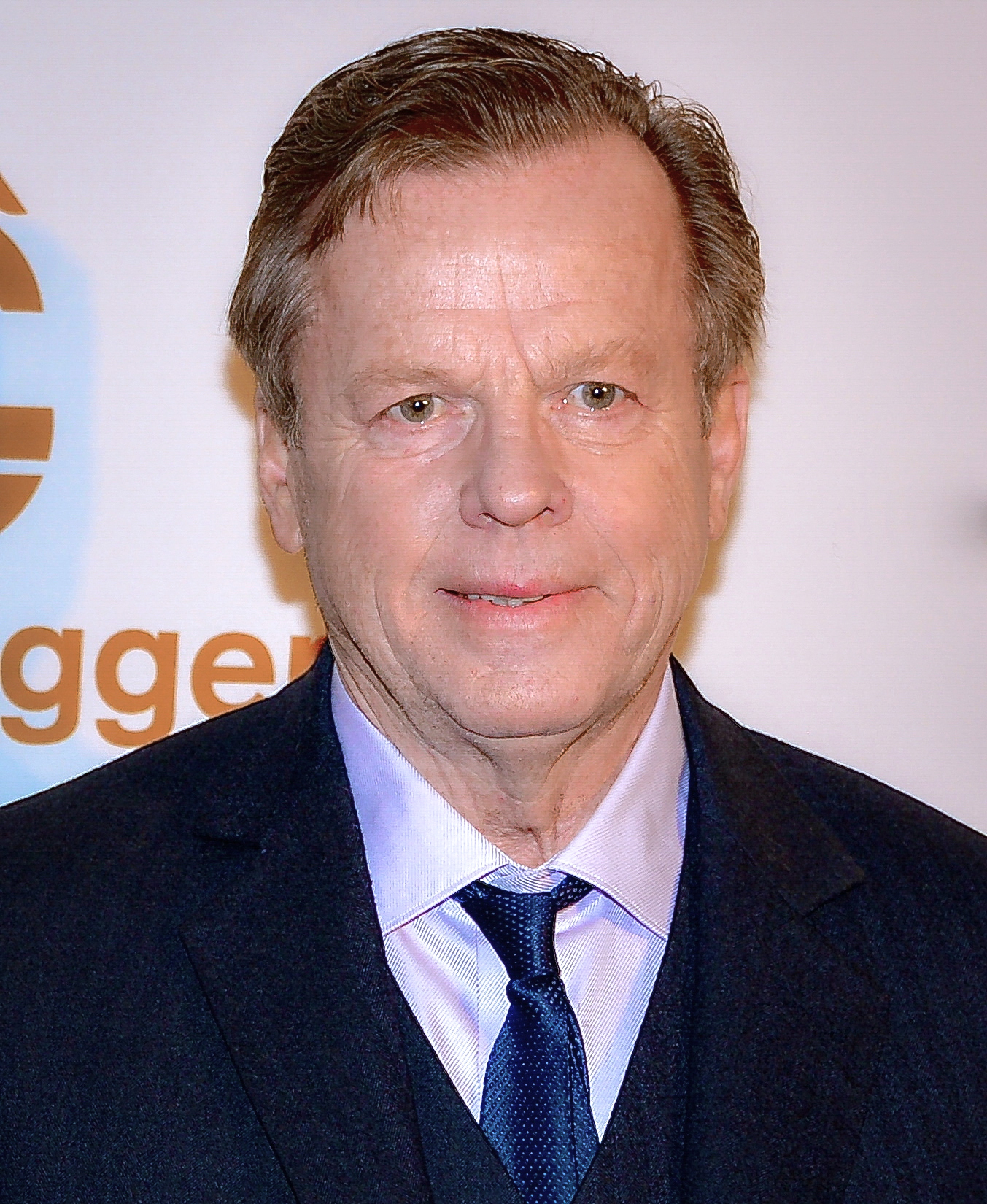
- Henriksson at the 2013 Guldbagge Award.
- Born: Jan Krister Allan Henriksson; 12 November 1946 (age 79); Grisslehamn, Sweden
- Occupation: Actor
- Years active: 1971–present
- Spouse(s): Grynet Molvig (divorced); Cecilia Nilsson
- Children: 3 (one with Nilsson)

Jan Krister Allan Henriksson (born 12 November 1946) is a Swedish actor. He is best known for playing Kurt Wallander in the television films based on the novels by Henning Mankell.

== Early life ==
Henriksson was born in Grisslehamn, Norrtälje Municipality, Sweden, and is the son of the fishmonger Allan Henriksson and Gunvor (née Sjöblom). He passed his studentexamen in 1967 and attended Statens scenskola in Malmö from 1968 to 1971. Henriksson worked at the Norrköping City Theatre in 1971, Stockholm City Theatre from 1972 and TV-teatern from 1980 to 1983. He made his breakthrough in 1973 at Stockholm City Theatre with the lead role in Peer Gynt.

== Career ==
In 1993 he joined the cast of the Royal Dramatic Theatre in Stockholm. In 1997 he was honoured with the Eugene O'Neill Award. He has twice received the Swedish Film Award Guldbagge Award for the best male lead—in 1998 for his portrayal of a cancer-stricken actor in the film Veranda för en tenor (Waiting for the Tenor) and in 2005 for Sex, hope and love. Both films were directed by Lisa Ohlin. He also received the Swedish Theatre Award Guldmasken for the one-man play Doktor Glass of Hjalmar Söderberg in 2007.

Henriksson branched into business as co-owner of the now defunct Vasateatern (The Vasa Theatre), a private theatre focusing on classic farce and comedy in Stockholm, and taught Scenic Design at the Stockholm School of Theater. He also runs the film-production company Tåbb Ltd together with his wife, Cecilia Nilsson, and he is co-owner of the audiobook publisher Svenska Ljud Audioförlag together with Carlson Invest Ltd, Frekvens Produktion Ltd and the actors Katarina Ewerlöf and Johan Rabaeus.

== Personal life ==
Henriksson has been married to the actress Cecilia Nilsson since the 1980s. They lived together in Stockholm for decades but have since chosen to live separately. He has two daughters and a son.

== Selected filmography ==
- The Walls of Freedom (1978)
- Codename Coq Rouge (1989)
- 1939 (1989)
- The Rabbit Man (1990)
- Pelle flyttar till Komfusenbo (1990)
- Night of the Orangutan (1992)
- My Great Big Daddy (1992)
- Christmas Oratorio (1996)
- Kalle Blomkvist – Mästerdetektiven lever farligt (1996)
- Waiting for the Tenor (1998)
- Faithless (2000)
- Cabin Fever a.k.a. Dogme #19 (2000)
- Executive Protection (2001)
- Reconstruction (2003)
- Return of the Dancing Master (2004)
- Sex, Hope and Love (2005)
- Den enskilde medborgaren (2006)
- Solstorm (2007)
- Wallander (2005–2013)
- With Every Heartbeat (2011)
- The Fall (2016)
- Modus (2016)
- Count Magnus (2022) (narrator)
