= Fredrik Gunnarsson =

Swedish actor

- Born: Hans Göte Fredrik Gunnarsson; September 4, 1965 (age 60); Oxelösund, Sweden
- Occupation: Actor

Fredrik Gunnarsson (born Hans Göte Fredrik Gunnarsson, September 4, 1965 in Oxelösund) is a Swedish actor. He is best known for playing the character Svartman in a series of television films based on the Kurt Wallander novels by Henning Mankell. He has also worked at the Malmö City Theatre and had a small cameo role in an episode of the British Wallander series.
