= List of Radioskugga episodes =

The 1995 Swedish TV series Radioskugga stars Figge Norling as the lead role. It follows radio host Alexander and the villagers in small town Bakvattnet.

== Episodes ==
=== Season 1 (1995) ===
No.	Title	Directed by	Written by	Original release date
1	"Radioskugga"	Jonas Grimås	Johan Grönvall & Jonas Frykberg	October 31, 1995
Radio presenter Alexander is fired from his job at the urban radio station. When he is offered a job at the new station Radio North Pole he moves to the small village Bakvattnet in northern Sweden only to learn that the potential audience is a mere fraction of what he is used to (533 on a clear day).
2	"Flyter kärlek på pappersbåtar?"	Jonas Grimås	Jonas Frykberg	November 7, 1995
A visit by charismatic nurse Katarina (Maud Adams) coincides with a yearly ritual where the villagers put paper boats in a lake and each think of someone they wish would move to the village.
3	"Botar man lappsjuka med trolltrumma?"	Jonas Grimås	Ulrika Kolmodin	November 14, 1995
Talvi's mother Elsa (Anna-Maria Blind) makes a surprising appearance causing friction with her daughter. Alexander looks into the possibility of an interview series with Sami people, but Johannes advises against it.
4	"Har stenen blivit guld?"	Jonas Grimås	Hans Rosenfeldt	November 21, 1995
Alexander's girlfriend Jenny (Tova Magnusson-Norling) drops by the village with a feeble excuse and an invitation for Alexander to return to Stockholm. A young soldier Niklas (Johan Widerberg) deserts the army.
5	"Åker änglar flygplan?"	Björn Gunnarsson	Ulrika Kolmodin	November 28, 1995
When preparing for hunting, Ragnar discovers a young boy lost in the woods. He calls nurse Katarina and asks she examines the boy. Beata records a video message for Niklas and Katarina is briefly caught on film in an unexpected composition.
6	"Kan man dricka en klunk av livet?"	Björn Gunnarsson	Svante Kettner	December 5, 1995
Three representatives from an advertising agency (Mikael Persbrandt, Anna-Lena Brundin and Lena Nilsson) look into the prospect of selling water from the lake and Alexander tries to uncover the villagers opinion towards the project. Beata struggles with her decision whether or not to visit Niklas.
7	"Får alla ett tecken?"	Björn Gunnarsson	Ulrika Kolmodin/Charlotte Lesche	December 12, 1995
A circus is heading for the village, Johannes falls ill and Talvi believes to have seen an omen saying he will die. Nurse Katarina invites Ragnar to a trip.
8	"Hur vet man när man är hemma?"	Björn Gunnarsson	Jonas Frykberg	December 19, 1995
After a funeral several villagers voice their wishes to leave. Alexander has been offered a high-profile TV job in Stockholm but is retained by Jonny because of his likeness to a facial composite of a robber. Father Berg moves in with Johannes.

=== Season 2 (1997) ===
No.	Title	Directed by	Written by	Original release date
1	"Finns det liv bortom bergen?"	Roger Sellberg	Ulrika Kolmodin	January 20, 1997
Johannes witnesses a green glow in the sky at night. The next morning there is a hand print on a nearby cliff. Ragnar returns from the circus and Jonny gives Camilla a horse.
2	"Kan rävar dansa tango?"	Roger Sellberg	Hans Rosenfeldt	January 27, 1997
Alexander takes it upon himself to direct a local production of King Lear. An old acquaintance has Talvi question some decisions. Ragnar, to Jonny's dislike, shows interest in a tango dancing class.
3	"Är kärleken alltid blind?"	Roger Sellberg	Ulrika Kolmodin	February 3, 1997
A blind relative of Oscar's (Ann-Sofie Rase) arrives to vitness the solar eclipse. Alexander helps her arrange a ceremony to get her eyesight back.
4	"Kom storken ensam?"	Roger Sellberg	Jonas Frykberg	February 10, 1997
Camilla sees a stork. Nurse Katarina examines Talvi and lets her know that she is pregnant. Jonny, not knowing about the pregnancy, asks Talvi for a time-out and moves out. Father berg moves out of Johannes's house.
5	"För vem dansar solen?"	Filippa Pierrou	Pernilla Oljelund	February 17, 1997
At easter, Talvi invites Alexander to join her and Camilla on a trip to a Sami place of sacrifice. A wanderer visits Johannes and Father Berg. Beatha returns but Gun insists on closing the local shop where she used to work.
6	"Visar alla speglar samma bild?"	Filippa Pierrou	Måns Mårlind	February 24, 1997
A reporter from Stockholm comes to Bakvattnet to make a news piece, to Alexanders dislike, and Talvi wants to buy the Café from Johannes, which he denies. Both these events come to question his mayor-like position. Beata is discontent. Johannes gives her a necklace and tells her it will help.
7	"Kan man ha tur i oturen?"	Filippa Pierrou	Hans Rosenfeldt	March 3, 1997
Friday the 13th has superstitious Johnny wound up. Ragnar returns from a trip and invites a girl, Ella, for a visit to the village. Johannes gives Alexander a cottage and Alexander moves out of his room at Gun's house.
8	"Finns det ett slut?"	Filippa Pierrou	Hans Rosenfeldt	March 10, 1997
The village celebrates an annual fair, Bakvattnet's day. Jonny misplaces his gun and Ragnar and Ella prepare to get married. Johannes presents Alexander the new radio antenna, reaching some 50000 listeners.
