= Hallerstam =

Hallerstam is a surname. Notable people with the surname include:

- Leo Hallerstam (born 1986), Swedish actor and voice actor
- Staffan Hallerstam (born 1957), Swedish actor and voice actor
