= Ellen Mattsson =

Swedish actress

Ellen Mattson
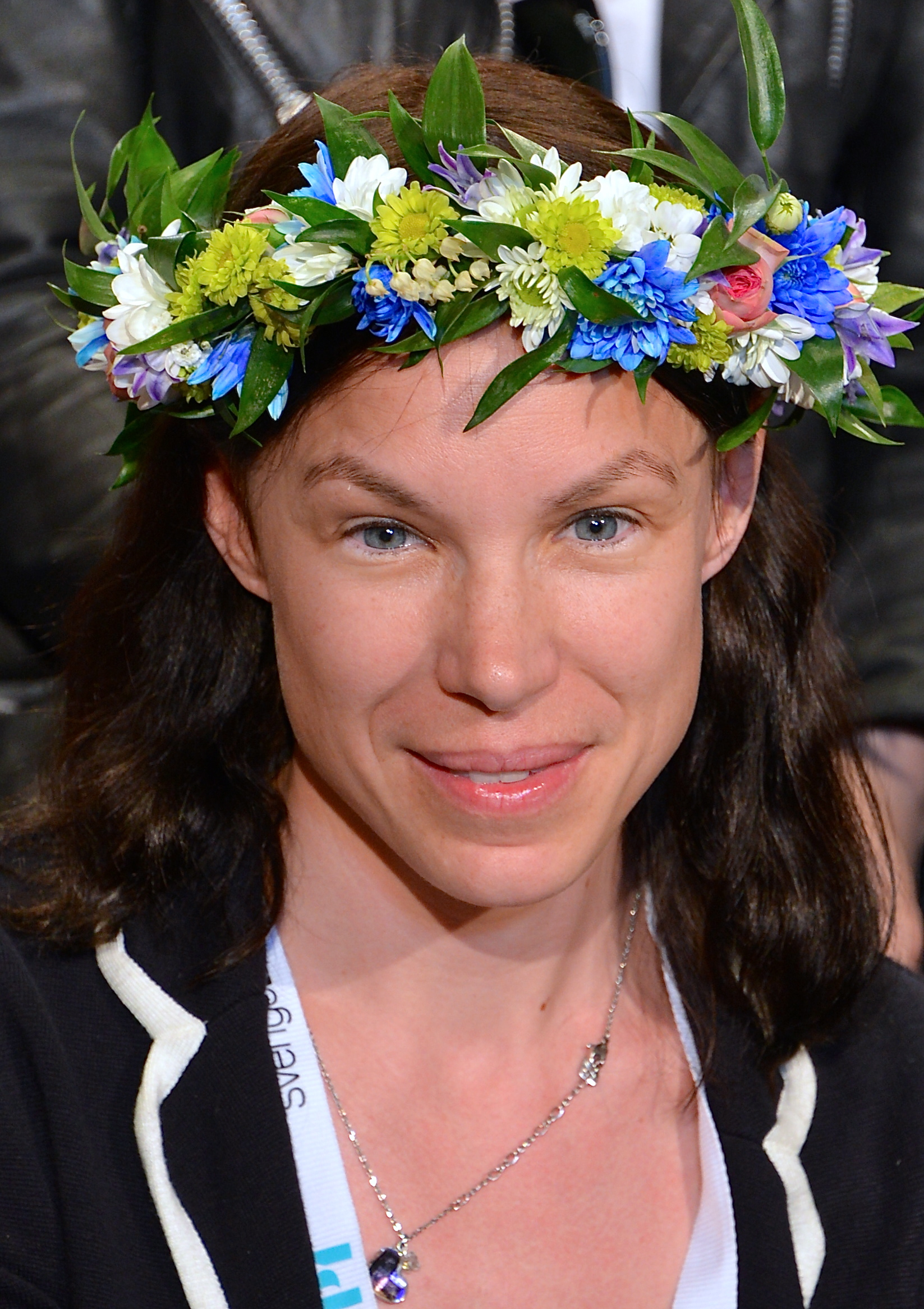
- Mattson in 2013
- Born: 5 December 1973 (age 51); Sollentuna, Sweden
- Occupation: Actress

Ellen Marianne Mattsson Jelinek (born 5 December 1973) is a Swedish actress.

Mattsson studied at Swedish National Academy of Mime and Acting 2000–04. She has been engaged at Teater Västmanland, Göta Lejon and the Royal Dramatic Theatre.

== Selected filmography ==
- Wallander - Innan frosten (2005)
- Harrys döttrar (2005)
- Lovisa och Carl Michael (2005)
- En uppstoppad hund (2006)
- LasseMajas detektivbyrå (TV series) (2006)
- AK3 (2006)
- 2010 (2006)
- Den nya människan (2007)
- Underbar och älskad av alla (2007)
- Maria Wern – Främmande fågel (2008)
- Vi hade i alla fall tur med vädret – igen (2008)
- Perrongen (2009)
- Cockpit (2012)
- The Machinery (2022)
