= Figge Norling =

Swedish actor

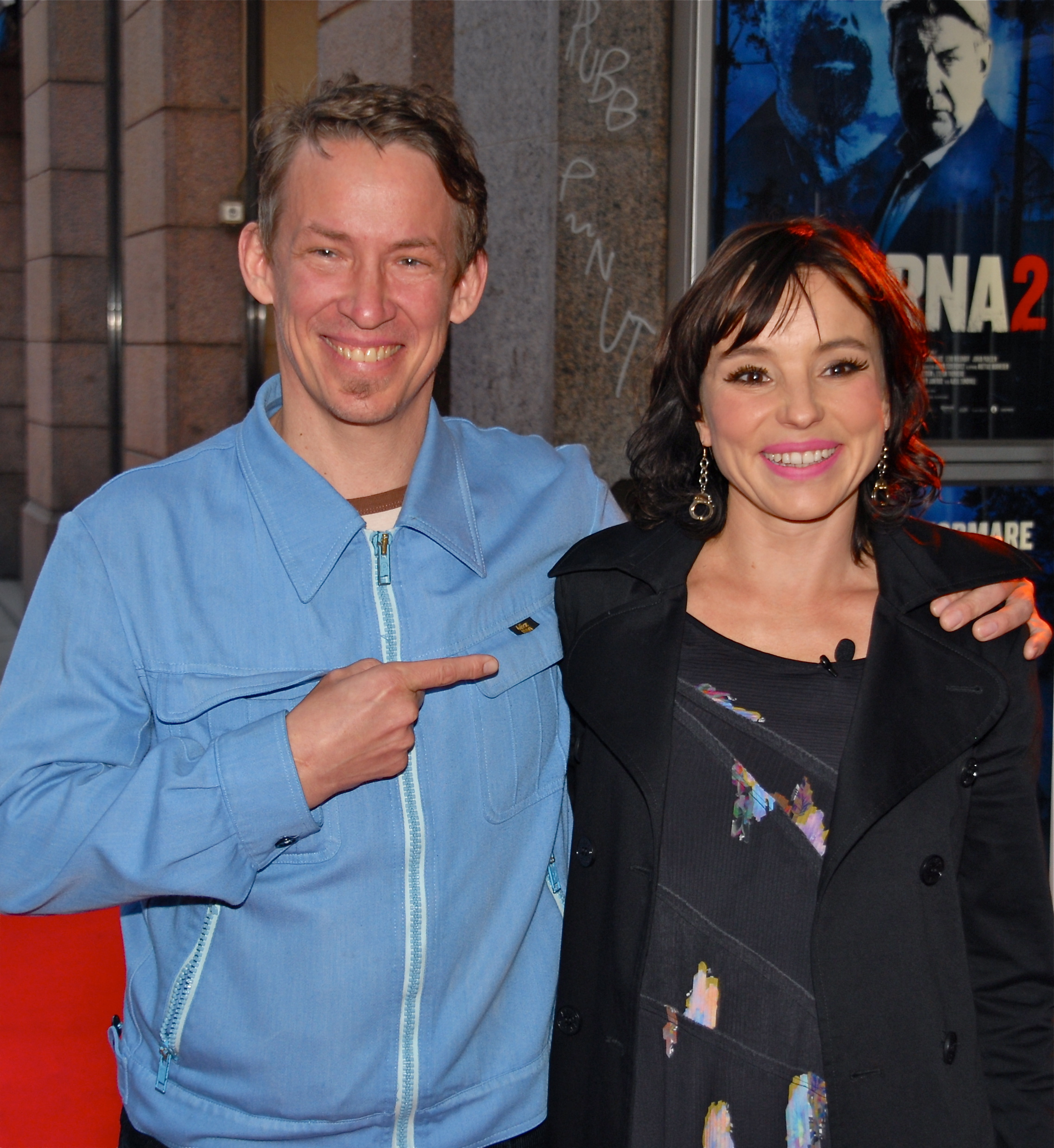
Norling and Lo Kauppi in 2011

Fredrik Olof Johan "Figge" Norling (born 1 May 1965) is a Swedish actor and theatre director. He is known for being the voice for Emperor Kuzco from the Swedish dub of The Emperor's New Groove.

Norling was born in Lycksele, Sweden. He was educated at the Swedish National Academy of Mime and Acting in Stockholm. He has been engaged at the National Swedish Touring Theatre, the Royal Dramatic Theatre, the Boulevardteatern and Intiman. His voice is best known from SR's program Clownen luktar bensin, where he also was active as screenwriter.

He is married to the actress Tova Magnusson Norling.

== Filmography ==
- Wallander – Prästen (2009)
- 2008 – Skägget i brevlådan (active as storyteller)
- 2007 – Isprinsessan
- 2004 – Miss Sweden
- Puder (2001)
- The Emperor's New Groove (2000)
- Naken (2000)
- 1998 – Vita lögner
- Beck – Mannen med ikonerna (1997)
- Beck – Lockpojken (1997)
- 1996 – Anna Holt
- Drömprinsen - Filmen om Em (1996)
- 1995 – Radioskugga
- Svart Lucia (1992)
- 1990 – Apelsinmannen
