= Ulf Kjell Gür =

Swedish singer and theatre producer

Ulf Kjell Gür (born 3 December 1951) is a Swedish theatre producer, filmmaker and singer-songwriter. He was artistic and managing director of Gothenburg City Theatre from 1992 to 1995, CEO at Sandrews Teater AB in 1995–1996, producer at the Royal Dramatic Theatre, Stockholm, from 1997 to 2002, and then producer at the Boulevardteatern, Stockholm, from 2002 to 2006. He has been involved in several international theatre, dance and music productions/festivals. As a singer/musician he was active in Tom Trick from 1979 to 1983, and later a founder member in the European music group NOWlab since 1985.

== Stage productions (selection) ==
- Kiss of the Spider Woman by Manuel Puig, 1988, Pistolteatern, Stockholm, directed by Christian Tomner
- Miss Julie by August Strindberg, 1989, Pistolteatern, directed by Christian Tomner
- Kanin, kanin by Coline Serreau, 1993, Gothenburg City Theatre, directed by Gunilla Berg
- Count of Monte Cristo by Alexandre Dumas/adapted by Per Lysander, 1994, Gothenburg City Theatre, directed by Ronny Danielsson
- The Rise and Fall of Little Voice by Jim Cartwright, 1994, Gothenburg City Theatre, directed by Joachim Siegård
- The Blue Angel by Heinrich Mann, 1996, Intiman, Stockholm, directed by Dilek Gür & Ulf Kjell Gür
- Don Juan by Molière, 1999, Royal Dramatic Theatre, directed by Mats Ek
- The Dresser by Ronald Harwood, 2001, Royal Dramatic Theatre, directed by Thorsten Flinck
- Söderkåkar by Gideon Wahlberg, 2005, Boulevardteatern, directed by Anders Wällhed
