= Historien om någon =

1951 children's book by Åke Löfgren and Egon Møller-Nielsen

- Cover art
- Author: Åke Löfgren
- Illustrator: Egon Møller-Nielsen; Eva P. Eriksson (tactile edition); Marguerite Ahlbom (tactile edition)
- Language: Swedish
- Genre: Children's literature, mystery
- Published: 1951
- Publisher: Folket i Bild, Rabén & Sjögren
- Publication place: Sweden
- Pages: 26
- Website: Official website (in Swedish)

Historien om någon (Swedish for "The Story About Someone") is a Swedish children's story written by Åke Löfgren and illustrated by Egon Møller-Nielsen. It was originally published by Folket i Bild in 1951, and has since been re-released by Rabén & Sjögren; a tactile edition for readers with impaired vision has also been produced by the Swedish Library of Talking Books and Braille, with tactile illustrations by Eva P. Eriksson and Marguerite Ahlbom.

A mystery picture book, Historien om någon sees the point-of-view character follow a red string of yarn through a Swedish 1950s house to learn the identity of an unknown visitor; a conceit that originally came from Møller-Nielsen. The book is considered a classic children's story, and is still in print as of 2018. Although Møller-Nielsen did not follow Historien om någon with further children's books, others have followed in its tradition of picture book spaces as play areas. A musical theater adaptation by Boulevardteatern premiered in 2011 in Stockholm.

== Synopsis ==
In the book, readers follow a string through a Swedish 1950s house drawn by Egon Møller-Nielsen.

Historien om någon is a mystery picture book with an unseen point-of-view character serving as a stand-in for the reader, who searches for an unknown visitor in a home. In a hide-and-seek-like fashion, the reader follows the trail of a red string of yarn from the point-of-view character's grandma's knitting, which the visitor has brought with them.

Each page spread shows a new room in the house, and gives a clue to the identity of the visitor – including a tipped-over jug of milk, and a part where the string, seemingly impossibly if the visitor were human, loops around a baluster in the staircase – before the point-of-view character follows the string to a cabinet, and, looking through its keyhole, finds that the visitor is the cat Nisse.

The book's narrator invites the reader into the home, and is used to make the reader-character an active part of the story, with phrasings directed to the reader indicating action on their part, such as "Let's open the door".

== Production ==
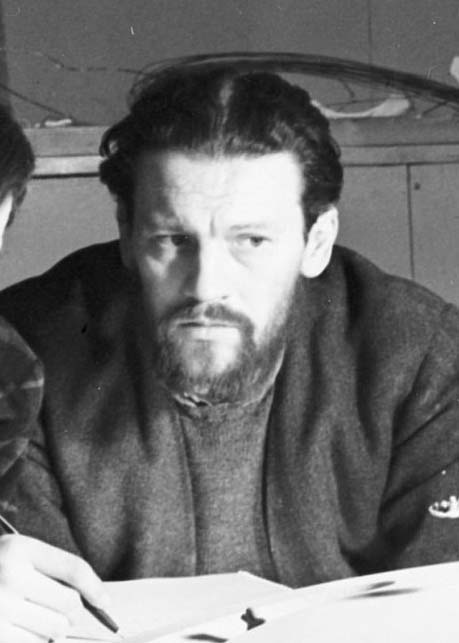
The book's concept came from its illustrator Egon Møller-Nielsen.

The book was written by the Swedish book publisher Åke Löfgren, who worked together with the Danish-Swedish architect, sculptor and illustrator Egon Møller-Nielsen. It was originally published in 1951 by Folket i Bild, and has since been re-released by Rabén & Sjögren. A Danish edition, titled Historien om en eller anden, followed in 1969, and a combined print and audiobook edition in both Swedish and West Syriac was released in 2005. The book was one of the first modern Swedish children's books written from a child character's perspective, in contrast to earlier Swedish children's books which present stories with morals.

The concept for the book originally came from Møller-Nielsen, who conceived it as a detective story and wrote "a detective novel" in pencil on the title page of his illustrations for it. The illustrations depict a Swedish 1950s house, with design typical of the time; the work of one of the dominant designers at the time, Stig Lindberg, was influential on the artwork, for example through the depiction of porcelain of his design on a table. The illustrations at times make use of a change in perspective or a close-up, to show important details and hint at the identity of the visitor. The margins and edges of the book are particularly constructed to retain continuity in the setting across pages, to overcome the physical limitations of a printed book which by necessity consists of pages as separate units.

A tactile picture book edition of Historien om någon was produced and published by the Swedish Library of Talking Books and Braille in 2001. The tactile pictures in this edition were created by Eva P. Eriksson and Marguerite Ahlbom, and are textured and raised from the page, allowing children with impaired vision to recognize the everyday objects portrayed through touch. The book was chosen to be adapted into a tactile book in part due to its status as a classic children's book, as a way of letting blind children partake in a piece of children's culture; and also because the illustrations portray common items easily recognized by children.

== Reception and legacy ==
Historien om någon is Löfgren's most well known work, and is considered a classic among children's books. It has also been commercially successful, with between half a million and a million copies sold as of 2019, and remains in print as of 2018. Despite the book's success, Møller-Nielsen did not work on any further children's books.

Swedish newspaper Dagens Nyheter called Historien om någon "brilliant and evocative", and in 2015 ranked it as the twelfth best mystery book of all time, describing it as an "ingenious picture book" and a classic mystery for children. Upsala Nya Tidning wrote that Møller-Nielsen's illustrations show a great understanding of space, and are a good portrayal of a child's perspective; they noted that the book, due to its 1951 release, could come across as "old-fashioned" by 2019, both in terms of illustrations and prose, but that it still held up as a classic, with a believable and cohesive setting that points readers toward the solution. In their book Assistive Technology for Blindness and Low Vision, writers Roberto Manduchi and Sri Kurniawan note that although the tactile edition changes the reading experience – turning the disorder in the original into order, and having less interaction between text and illustration – and no longer carries with it the visual culture history, it still succeeds in being accessible to blind children.

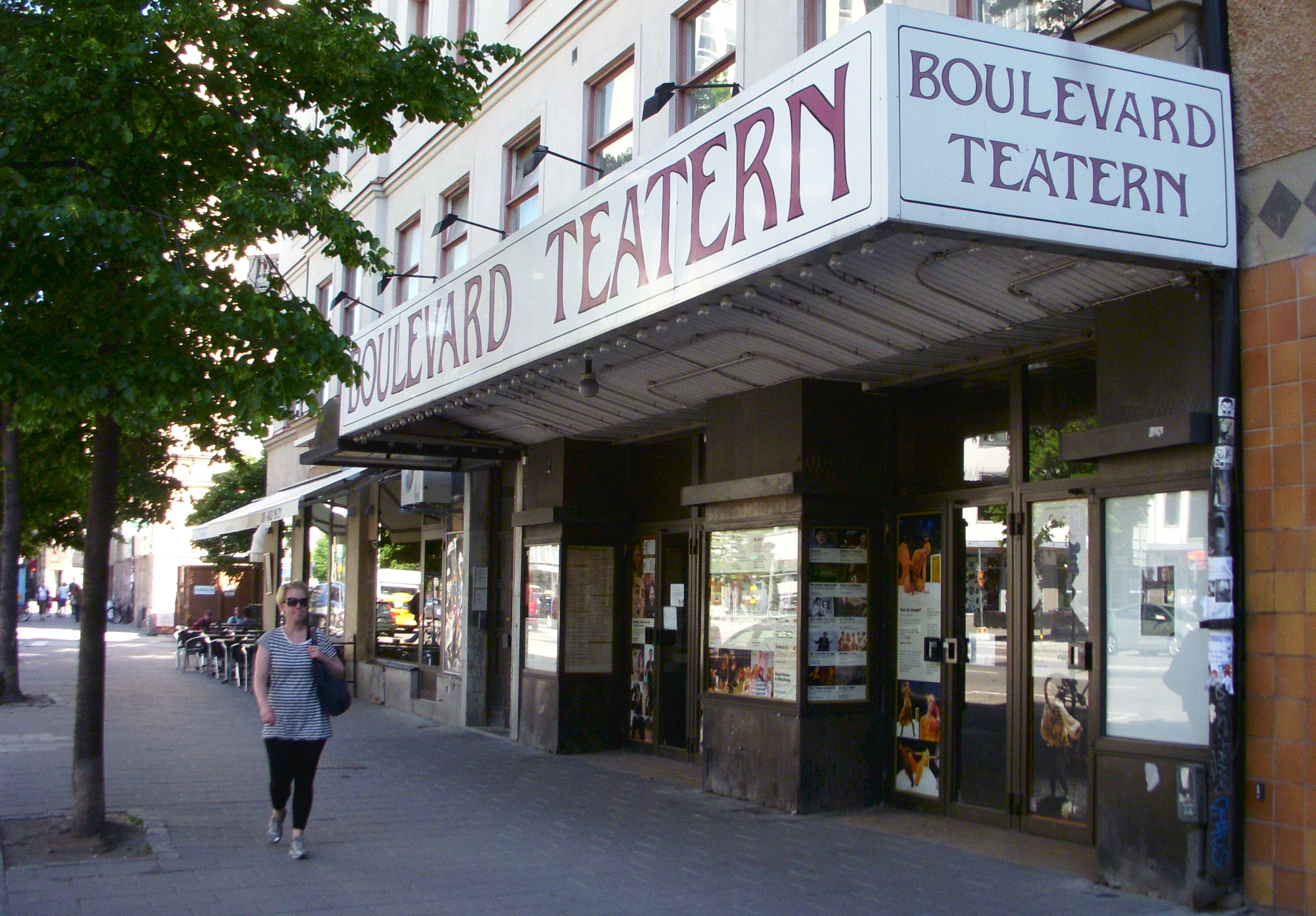
A stage adaptation by Boulevardteatern premiered in 2011.

In "Picturebooks and Trojan Horses", writer Elina Druker considers Historien om någon as part of a larger artistic context of book illustrations and avant-garde art books, through its book-as-a-building conceit. Møller-Nielsen had previously worked in a similar tradition in his 1947 picture book Historien om... ("The Story About..."), which also plays with the physical aspect of the book through the use of pages with holes that can be seen through. Later books following the tradition of Historien om någon, with its use of space as a play area in picture books, include Sanna Mander's Nyckelknipan (2017), Aron Landahl's Dropp dropp (2019), and Ebba Berg's and Alexander Jansson's Tassemarker (2019); Upsala Nya Tidning considered the latter a worthy successor to Historien om någon, although less innovative.

A musical theater adaptation of the book, aimed at children aged 2–4, was performed by Boulevardteatern in Stockholm in 2011; it was directed and written by Sten Hellström, with scenography by Amanda Cederquist, music by Pelle Halvarsson, and on-stage performances by Halvarsson and Mirja Breitholtz. Dagens Nyheter criticized the musical for stretching out the short story too much when adapting it, and for its use of a large stage in a production aimed at young children, but liked Halvarsson's cello-based music; on the other hand, Nerikes Allehanda called it an exciting play for young children. Boulevardteatern has since performed Historien om någon at other venues in Sweden, including at libraries.
