= Per Hanefjord =

Swedish film director and screenwriter

- Born: 25 September 1978 (age 47)
- Occupation: film director
- Website: www.hanefjord.com

Per Håkan Tobias Hanefjord (25 September 1978) is a Swedish film director and screenwriter.

Hanefjord was born in Lycksele. He has written and directed a number of short films and was educated at Swedish Institute of Dramatic Art (DI) on the directing course between 2005 and 2008.

Hanefjord's diploma film from DI, Elkland, was awarded (2009) a "Student Oscar" by The Academy of Motion Picture Arts and Sciences.

== Filmography ==
=== Director ===
- 2002 – Barn leker ute a.k.a. "Kids Play outside"
- 2001 – Svärmor a.k.a. "Mother in Law"
- 2005 – En god dag a.k.a. "A Good Day"
- 2006 – Allt Man vill a.k.a. "All That You Want"
- 2007 – Forechecking morfar a.k.a. Fore-Checking Grandpa
- 2008 – Mellan 11 och 12 (TV) (segment "Kyrkan")
- 2008 – Anita of Sweden
- 2008 – Mellan oss a.k.a. "Between You And Me"
- 2018 – RIG45
- 2009 – Elkland
- 2013 – Tyskungen – Camilla Läckberg a.k.a. The Hidden Child
- 2023 – En helt vanlig familj a.k.a. A Nearly Normal Family

=== Screenwriter ===
- 2001 – Svärmor a.k.a. "Mother in Law"
- 2002 – Barn leker ute a.k.a. "Kids Play Outside"
- 2005 – En god dag a.k.a. "A Good Day"
- 2007 – Forechecking morfar a.k.a. Fore-Checking Grandpa
- 2009 – Elkland

=== Cinematography ===
- 2000 – Gropen a.k.a. "The Pit"
