= Tova Magnusson =

Swedish actress (born 1968)

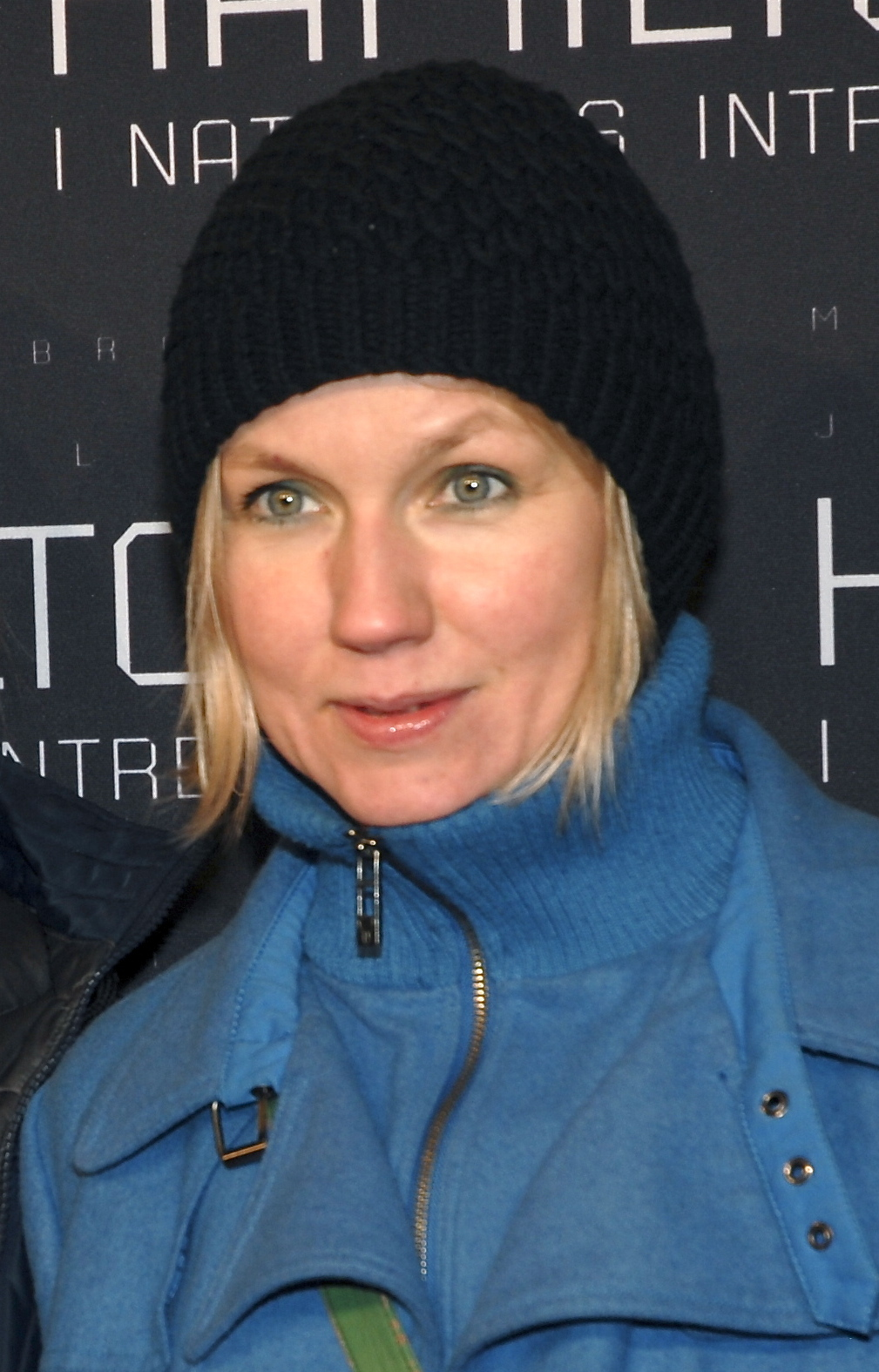
- Magnusson in 2012
- Born: Towa Dorothea Magnusson; 1968 (age 57–58); Huddinge, Stockholm County, Sweden
- Other name: Tova Magnusson Norling
- Occupations: Actress; director
- Years active: 1992–present

Tova Dorothea Magnusson (born 1968), also credited under her former married name as Tova Magnusson Norling, is a Swedish film and television actress; comedian; and film director. She is best known outside Sweden for her role in the Danish-Swedish series The Bridge (2013).

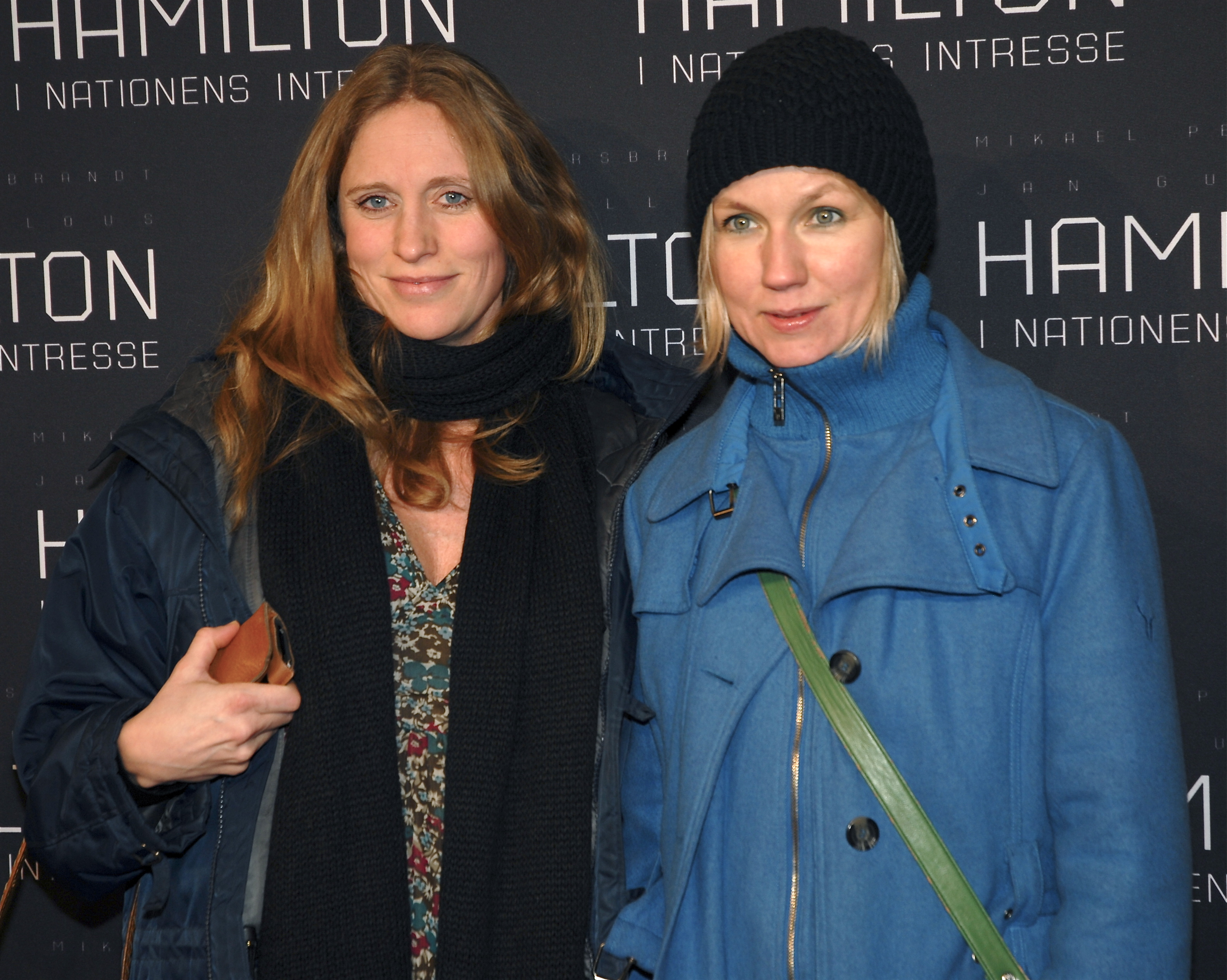
Magnusson (right) in Stockholm in 2012.

== Biography ==
She was born in Huddinge and raised in Sorunda, both in Stockholm County, Sweden. She was married to fellow Swedish actor and director Figge Norling from 1992 until their divorce in 2004. They have two children.

== Career ==
=== Theatre ===
In 1997, with Simon Norrthorn, Malin Cederblad, and Figge Norling, she formed "Gruppen" ("The Group"). Their first production, Clownen luktar bensin, was performed on Boulevardteatern and later moved to radio on Sveriges Radio P3.

Theatre work

- Clownen Luktar Bensin (Boulevardteatern)
- Speed the Plow by David Mamet (Boulevardteatern, 1999)
- Skitungen — En Omöjlig Gosse (Teater Plaza, 2000)

=== Film and television work ===
Magnusson has appeared in over fifteen films and over fifteen television productions. She has also directed several television productions and one film.

Acting

- Ha ett Underbart Liv (1992)
- Svart Lucia (1992)
- Den gråtande ministern (1993); television series
- Roseanna (1993)
- Brandbilen Som Försvann (1993)
- Polis, polis, potatismos (1993)
- Mannen på balkongen (1993)
- Radioskugga (1995) as Jenny; two episodes, television series
- Vi skulle ju bli lyckliga... (1995)
- Att Stjäla en Tjuv (1996)
- Dödsklockan (1999); television film
- Norrmalmstorg (2003); television film
- Medicinmannen (2005); television series
- Den som viskar (2006)
- Keillers Park (2006)
- Flickan (2009)
- En busslast kärlek (2010)
- Fyra år till (2010)
- Gustafsson (2011); television series
- Solsidan (2012); television series
- Det knullande paret (2013)
- The Bridge (2013); television series
- Greyzone (2018)

Directing

- Miss Sweden (Fröken Sverige) (2003); drama film
- Gynekologen i Askim (2007); television miniseries
- Four More Years (Fyra år till) (2010)

== See also ==
- List of female film and television directors
- List of LGBT-related films directed by women
