= Egon Møller-Nielsen =

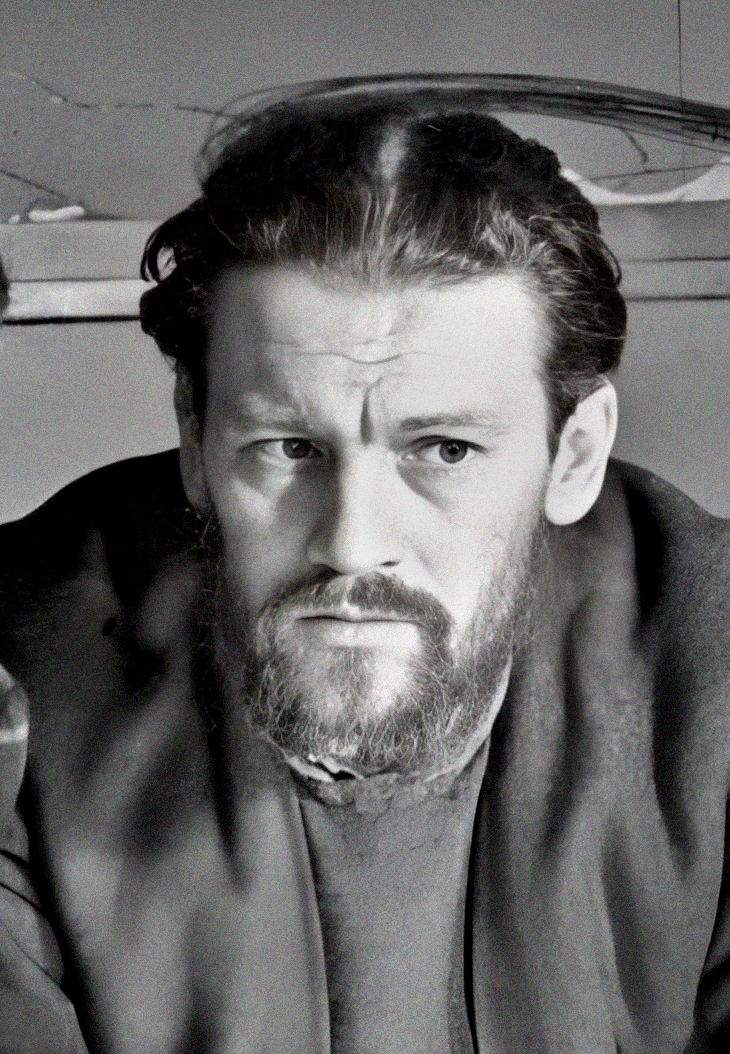
Egon Møller-Nielsen.

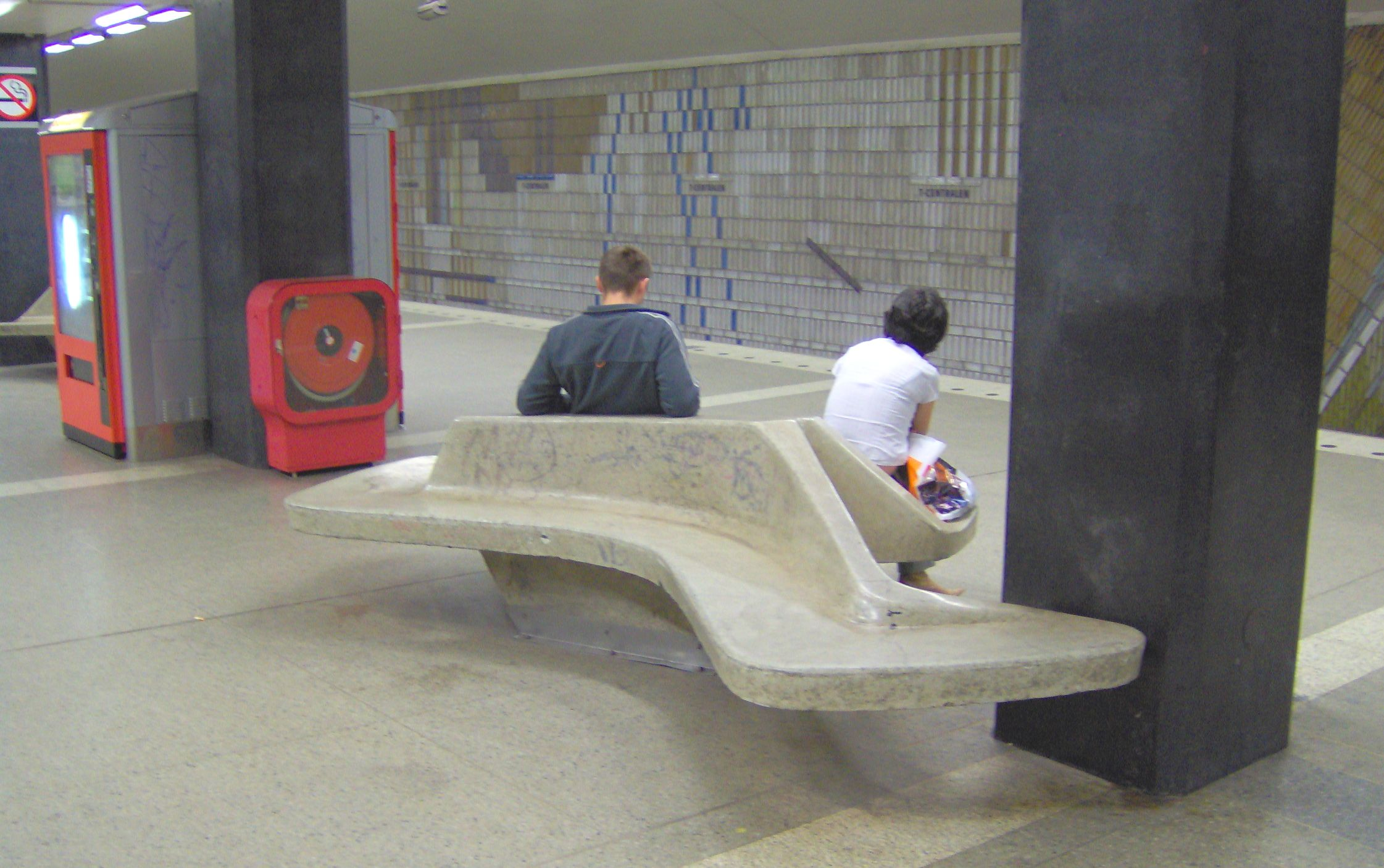
Sofa in stengöt (1957) at Stockholm Metro station T-Centralen (Stockholm), Red and Green lines

Egon Möller-Nielsen (9 May 1915 - 27 September 1959) was a Danish-Swedish architect and sculptor. He was known for his abstract sculptures in surreal style which are found in several Swedish sites.

== Biography ==
Möller-Nielsen was born in Copenhagen, Denmark. His parents were Niels Möller-Nielsen and Agnes Mary Gunnild Topshøj. He studied sculpture and architecture at the Royal Danish Academy of Fine Arts in Copenhagen in 1934–1937.

During the period 1937–38, he made extensive study trips: Sweden, Finland, Germany, Netherlands, Belgium, France, Switzerland, Italy, Spain, Portugal and the United Kingdom. Working with the Swedish book publisher Åke Löfgren, he illustrated the children's book Historien om någon (1951), which is considered a classic among children's books and was commercially successful, with between half a million and a million copies sold as of 2019.

He worked at an architectural office at Helsinki in 1938-1939 and at Stockholm in 1939–1943. From 1957 to 1959, he taught sculpture at Konstfackskolan in Stockholm.

He died during 1959 in Stockholm.

== See also ==
- Alvar Aalto
