= Lo Kauppi =

Swedish actress, director, and TV presenter (born 1970)

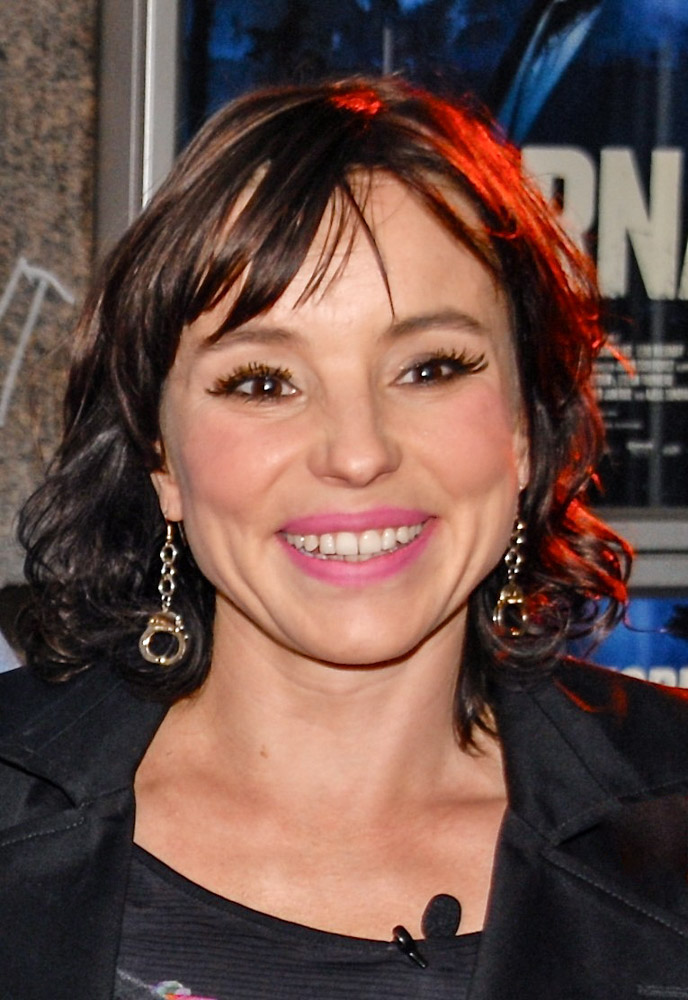
- Kauppi in 2011
- Born: 19 April 1970 (age 56); Skärholmen, Sweden
- Occupations: Actress; Theater Director; Television Host
- Years active: 1998–present
- Known for: The Parasite (2005); The New Man (2007); False Trail (2011); Real Humans (2014)
- Website: LoKauppi.se

Lo Marianne Kauppi (born 19 April 1970) is a Swedish film and theater actress, director, and television presenter. She has a successful career in theater, including performances at the Royal Dramatic Theatre in Stockholm. Kauppi has also had several acting roles in Swedish films.

== Early life ==
Kauppi was born on 19 April 1970 in Skärholmen, a suburb of Stockholm, Sweden. In her early 20s—during her studies to become a hairdresser in London—she became addicted to drugs. She also suffered from an eating disorder.

== Career ==
After treatment for her addictions, she attended the Swedish National Academy of Mime and Acting in Stockholm to study theater between 1999 and 2003. Since 1997, Kauppi has performed in several theater, television and movie productions. She has played at Sweden's national Royal Dramatic Theatre in Stockholm in such plays as Jösses flickor – Återkomsten ("Oh, Girls – the Return") in 2006 and in Hamlet in 2007 as Ophelia.

In 2009, she toured in the stand-up show Undercover with dancer Anna Vnuk. In 2003–05, she toured with the biographical solo show Bergsprängardottern som exploderade ("The Mountain Blaster Daughter Who Exploded"), which was later published as a book. In 2010, she debuted as a director in the play Bergsprängardöttrar at the National Swedish Touring Theatre. She wrote the script for the play, based on conversations with interns and caregivers, at the correctional facilities in Hinseberg and Ystad. The same year she participated in the Sveriges Radio program På jakt efter kvinnan ("Searching For Woman"), a show about female orgasm and sex. In 2011 she acted in the film False Trail, opposite Peter Stormare and Rolf Lassgård, playing the character Johanna Lager, a gun expert.

In 2005, Kauppi was a presenter for the radio show Flipper broadcast on Sveriges Radio. Kauppi is the co-writer of the book Hemlös ("Homeless") and the anthology Tala om klas. In 2012, she co-presented and was the focus of the SVT show Dom kallar oss skådisar ("They Call Us Actors"). In 2015, she acted in the play Vita kränkta män ("White Offended Men"). In March 2015, the documentary film Ta plats – en film om Lo Kauppi had its premiere at Tempofestivalen in Stockholm. The documentary charts Kauppi's life and achievements.

Kauppi was the singer and guitarist of the feminist punk band Vagina Grande until they disbanded. Other band members included film director Mia Engberg and Left Party politician Josefin Brink.

== Personal life ==
Kauppi is married to actor Figge Norling and the couple have a son.

== Awards ==
In 2004, she was named "Educator of the Year" by the magazine Window / ABF. She received the 2010 scholarship from the Helena Bering Memorial Fund and that same year was awarded the Jan Fridegård Prize.

== Theater roles ==
(selective)

- En månad på landet
- Bergsprängardottern som exploderade,
- Elsa-Lill in Herr Arnes penningar
- Hanna in Jösses flickor – Återkomsten
- Ophelia in Hamlet

== Selected filmography ==
- 1998 – Längtans blåa blomma
- 2002 – Cleo
- 2003 – Spung
- 2005 – Fallet G
- 2005 – Parasiten
- 2011 – False Trail
- 2011 – Gläntan
- 2012 – Vågor av längtan
- 2013 – Wallander – "Den orolige mannen"
- 2014 – Real Humans
- 2017 – In the Gap
- 2018 – Sisters 1968
- 2023 – A Nearly Normal Family
