= The Machinery =

Swedish television series

- Genre: Drama
- Created by: Richard Holm; Niclas Ekström; Kjersti Ugelstad
- Written by: Peter Arrhenius; Niclas Ekström; Kjersti Ugelstad; Gunnar Svensén; Karin Aspenström
- Directed by: Richard Holm
- Starring: Kristoffer Joner; Hanna Alström; Julia Schacht; Emilia Roosmann; Anastasios Soulis
- Original languages: Swedish, Norwegian, English
- No. of series: 2
- No. of episodes: 14

Production
- Production company: Viaplay

Original release
- Release: 24 May 2020

The Machinery (Swedish: Maskineriet) is a Swedish TV crime drama, which debuted on 24 May 2020 on Viaplay. It is directed by Richard Holm with the screenplay written by Peter Arrhenius, Niclas Ekström and Kjersti Ugelstad and co-created by Holm, Ekström and Ugelstad. The first season consists of eight episodes. Most of its action is set in September 2019 in Strömstad Sweden and Sandefjord Norway, flashbacks include scenes set in Mexico.

The second season of six episodes started on 15 May 2022. Additional scriptwriters are Gunnar Svensén and Karin Aspenström. Action is set two years later and mostly in Sweden although some scenes depict Norway.

== Plot ==
The main protagonist Olle (Kristoffer Joner) is investigated by police led by Nina (Julia Schacht) for his involvement in a robbery-murder orchestrated by his first wife Monika (Emilia Roosmann). Olle's second wife Josefin (Hanna Alström) is unaware of Olle's criminal past, while her financially desperate brother Palle (Anastasios Soulis) works for Monika due to his debts to criminal biker Axel (Mattias Nordkvist). Olle, Monika and Nina seek the stolen money. Monika is shot by Josefin but Olle takes the blame. Palle burns his own restaurant down for an insurance scam.

In the second season, Josefin now lives with daughter Lilly (Maja Svärd) and stepson Jimmy (Gabriel Gunerius Fevang) while continuing for her deceased father's business. Palle is out on parole. When Olle's trial is due to start, Jimmy, wearing a bomb vest, takes his classmates hostage, which results in his teacher becoming comatose and later dying. Monika flees after causing a prison transport collision and impersonates waitress Pernilla (Ellen Jelinek). Olle escapes with Erik (Magnus Roosmann – Emilia's father). Both Olle and Monika look for Josefin, their children and the money. Nina, suspended from active duty, unofficially hunts Monika and Olle. Palle conceals heist money and launders it via a luxury car racket. Palle is engaged to Julie (Roshi Hoss), who spies on him for Axel.

== Cast and characters ==
- Kristoffer Joner as Olle Hultén (né Ole Edvardsen, a.k.a. Terje Olav Mørk): ex-criminal, Monika's husband, abandoned her in Mexico prison, Jimmy's father. Josefin's husband, Lilly's father, Henrik's son-in-law and designated successor. Blackmailed by Monika into supplying Laholmen machinery for robbery. Imprisoned, awaiting trial, for shooting Monika. Escapes by convincing Erik that he hid stolen money.
  - Jakob Hetland as Young Ole: teenage friend of Brede, during robbery gone wrong he abandons Brede to die (season 1 only).
- Julia Schacht as Nina Berge: Oslo police officer, liaises with Swedish police to investigate robbery-murder and missing money. Brede's younger sister. Suspended for conflict of interest but continues investigating: arrests Olle and Monika. Later, still suspended, unofficially hunts both Monika and Olle, looking for heist money.
- Hanna Alström as Josefin Hultén: Olle's second wife, Lilly's mother, works for father Henrik's Laholmen company, Palle's elder sister. Becomes Jimmy's stepmother when Olle and Monika are imprisoned. After Henrik's death tries to run Laholmen, looks for missing money. Guilt-ridden she becomes increasingly unreliable, fired from Laholmen, loses custody of Lilly and Jimmy.
- Emilia Roosmann as Monika Hansen (a.k.a. Victoria Fagermoen): Olle's first wife, abandoned in Mexican prison, Jimmy's mother, Nikolaj's lover. Frames Olle for robbery-murder whilst getting away with money but thwarted by Olle and Josefin. Shot by Josefin. Escapes prison vehicle, seeks Jimmy and stolen money; wants revenge on Olle and Josefin.
- Anastasios Soulis as Palle Hultén: Henrik's son, Josefin's brother, financial ineptness leads to debts with Axel's criminal biker gang, bribed by Monika to frame Olle. Takes Lilly hostage on Monika's orders, burns down his restaurant for insurance money. Hides robbery money, after brief prison stint, launders money via stolen luxury car racket. Become engaged to Julie, who betrays him to Axel.
- Gabriel Gunerius Fevang as Jimmy: Monika and Olle's son, Lilly's older half-brother. Plays football, learns criminal activities from Monika, Nikolaj and Olle. Accidentally shot by Josefin. Fostered by Josefin after Monika's imprisonment. Takes classmates hostage, wearing bomb vest; plants second bomb in car. Car bomb injures his teacher who later dies.
- Maja Svärd as Lilly: Josefin and Olle's daughter, Jimmy's younger half-sister. Kidnapped by uncle Palle to lure Olle into Monika's trap. Supports Jimmy. Goes into fosterage after Josefin becomes erratic.
- Bahador Foladi as Daniel: Strömstad police, Olle's friend, liaises with Nina. Investigates Monika and Olle's escapes.
- Antti Reini as Håkan Johansson: supervisor at Laholmen, schemes to take-over Olle's favoured status, starts romancing Josefin. Promoted to replace Josefin. Seduced by Josefin but later killed by her.
- Angela Kovács as Louise Hultén: Henrik's wife, mother of Josefin and Palle. Becomes Laholmen board member, agrees with Josefin replacement by Håkan. Fights and kills Axel.
- Mattias Nordkvist as Axel Wessberg: Swedish criminal biker gang leader, loaned money to Palle. Tortures Palle when he defaults. Funds Erik's escape, expect payoff from Olle. Also suspects Palle of hiding stolen money. Fights Palle and Louise, killed by Louise.
- Iselin Shumba as "Police Superintendent"/Rahmiya: Nina's boss, suspends Nina due to link with Brede. Keeps Nina suspended, advises her to take up desk duties or resign. Disbelieves Nina's claim that Monika survived prison transport collision.

=== Season 1 only ===
- Emil Almén as Jack Harding: Olle's former friend but was abandoned during failed Mexican heist. Imprisoned at Topo Chico. Works with Monika to frame Olle, escapes Sandefjord heist scene with stolen money, takes Anja hostage. Causes accident, which kills Anja. Killed by Monika.
- Rune Temte as Magnus Helgesen: Sandefjord police, Nina's subordinate.
- Bjørn Sundquist as Einar Edvardsen: Sandefjord traffic police, Olle's father. Falsified Brede's death: removed evidence implicating Olle.
- Jakob Eklund as Henrik Hultén: Laholmen owner, married to Louise, father of Josefin and Palle. Anoints Olle as successor.
- Anderz Eide as Tom: Sandefjord mechanic at dockyards, Olle's former friend, works for Monika. Ran away during heist leaving Jack behind. Betrays Olle to Monika.
- Sampo Sarkola as Nikolaj Ström: Monika's lover, kills security guard during heist, frames Olle for robbery-murder. Killed in fight with Olle.
- Deniece Ignacio Nyman as Isabella: Palle's restaurant waitress, Palle's love interest.
- Anne Marie Ottersen as Irene Edvardsen: Olle's mother, Einar's wife.
- Hanne Dahle as "Nina's Mother": Brede Karlsen and Nina Berge's mother.
- Filip Aladdin as "truck driver": smuggles Olle across border from Norway to Sweden.
- Tind Soneby as "Hotel Maid": works at Swedish hotel, sees Olle tied up, killed by Monika.
- Kristin Grue as Anja Haltvik: Sandefjord security guard, taken hostage, killed in collision caused by Jack.
- Bernhard Ramstad as "Arthur the Farmer": harbours Jack, killed by Jack.
- Sebastian Oulie Brynhildvoll as Brede Karlsen: Nina's older brother, killed 20 years ago during robbery gone wrong. Left for dead by best friend Olle.
- Samantha Gurah as Cassandra/"Nikolaj's Neighbour": Magnus' friend.
- Tor Wibe as "Taxi Driver": takes Jack to boathouse.

=== Season 2 only ===
- Magnus Roosmann as Erik: long-term prisoner coerces Olle to fund his escape with heist money. Note: Magnus is the father of Emilia, who portrays Monika.
- Roshi Hoss as Julie: Palle's fiancée, spies for Axel.
- Ellen Jelinek as Pernilla Carlsson: waitress, helps Monika. Monika impersonates her.
- Semir Chatty as Mehmet: Erik's henchman, befriends then coerces Olle.
- Annika Ryberg Whittembury as Annika Hjort: Olle's lawyer.
- Robin Stegmar as "Guard Officer Tidaholm": inducts Olle into his cell.
- Sanna Ekman as Rebecca: Erik's girlfriend, contacts Axel for escape.
- Klas Wiljergård as Rasmus: hospital orderly on Jimmy's ward.
- Jonas Karlström as Reine Sandström: Palle's contact with car thieves.
- Kamjar Rezaei as Gordon: prison inmate, assaults Olle for Erik.
- Michael Brolin as Kenny: prison inmate, assaults Olle for Erik.
- Karl Ytterberg as Liam: buys and sells stolen luxury cars for Reine and Palle.
- Gilda Stillbäck as Eva-Lena: Jimmy's social studies teacher, critically injured by bomb: dies later.
- Karin Bengtsson as Lisa Bergström/"Negotiator": Swedish police negotiator.
- Lisa Öman as Elvis: Palle's hireling, helps launder money through Reine.
- Ramtin Parvaneh as Kasper Holmström: municipal social secretary, investigates Josefin's home situation; places Lilly in fosterage.
- Magnus Sundberg as "Investigator Tidaholm": Swedish police, interviews Olle about Kenny and Gordon's deaths.
- Charlotte Trulsen as "Foster Mother": cares for Lilly.
- Janne Aimée Fevik as "Restaurant Owner": Pernilla's boss.
- Erik Lundin as "Police Officer": assists Lisa and Daniel.
- Lars G. Svensson as Manfred/"Chairman Laholmen": Laholmen CEO, Josefin's boss.

== Episode guide ==
=== Season 1 ===
| No. overall | No. in season | Title | Directed by | Written by | Original release date |
|---|---|---|---|---|---|
| 1 | 1 | "Hunted" (Jagad) | Richard Holm | Peter Arrhenius, Niclas Ekström, Kjersti Ugelstad | 24 May 2020 |
Olle in car, wearing ski mask, bloodstained clothes. Money and gun in bag, beside him. Police search ferry. Olle goes to cafeteria. Josefin takes Lilly to school. Olle sees news about last night's Sandefjord robbery: security guard killed; Anja taken hostage. Strömstad-bound ferry ordered to return. Nikolaj recognises Olle. Olle pretends to be ferry guard. Nina arrives: directs all staff also checked. Olle surrounded by police on upper deck; jumps overboard, swims to ski jet and flees. Nina, in a patrol boat, pursues Olle. Jack threatens Anja at gunpoint. Olle escapes. Magnus directs Nina to crime scene. Jack shoots police; uses Anja as human shield. Olle remembers celebrating with Håkan; later with Monika. Nina and Magnus watch CCTV: three robbers; guard deliberately killed, Laholmen machinery used. Anja fills car's tank; when police arrive Jack forces her to drive off at speed. Jack distracts Anja: car crashes. Jack abandons injured Anja, who dies. Olle bribes "truck driver": smuggle him into Sweden. Olle messages Josefin: cannot pick up Lilly. Håkan to Nina: Olle left celebration early with woman. Josefin asks Palle: pick up Lilly. Nina calls on Josefin but Olle not home. Olle hides; joins Josefin when she puts Lilly to sleep.
| 2 | 2 | "Guilty?" (Skyldig?) | Richard Holm | Niclas Ekström, Kjersti Ugelstad | 24 May 2020 |
Olle dreams of Monika. Josefin finds Olle's bag. Olle claims not to remember what happened and unable to use gun. Palle hosts Henrik's birthday party at his restaurant. Henrik to Louise and Palle: Laholmen equipment used in robbery. Palle goes to office to search records. Josefin makes Olle take bag to police. Nikolaj sees Olle enter station. Olle lies to Josefin: gave bag to Daniel. Jack at Arthur's farm, texts Monika for help. Flashback: Brede teaches Nina to ride bike. Current: Nina and Magnus search for Jack. Olle arrives at Laholmen, tries to erase evidence. Olle collects bag from police, hides it at his new house. Nikolaj attacks and injects Olle. Nikolaj tries to hang Olle to fake suicide but Olle fights him off. Nina searches Arthur's farm for Jack but called away by Daniel. Palle's workers complain regarding underpayments. Magnus to Nina: no trace of Olle before he changed names. Håkan to Nina: Olle signed equipment order. Arthur killed by scythe-wielding Jack. Olle reassures Henrik that no one from Laholmen was involved in robbery. Nina and Daniel take Olle from celebration. On way to station demonstrators stop them: car tipped into river; Olle escapes.
| 3 | 3 | "Dead Man Walking" (Levande död) | Richard Holm | Niclas Ekström, Kjersti Ugelstad | 31 May 2020 |
Police raid Josefin's home. Olle sails Henrik's yacht to Sandefjord. Josefin to Nina: Olle took bag into police station; had no reason to steal. Nina: no trace of Olle before using fake name, Terje. Olle finds Monika used fake name, Victoria. He pretends to be IT support; accesses hotel's CCTV footage. Photographs Monika at bar. Monika and Jimmy in caravan when Nikolaj visits. Monika to Nikolaj: stick to plan. Nikolaj: Jack may not share. Monika finds Arthur's corpse. Olle visits Irene. Einar asks Olle to leave before he returns. Irene recognizes Monika from local football club. Louise's necklace missing. Nina continues searching for Jack. Jack steals car, with baby inside, from petrol station. Football club dad: Monika works at dockyard, points out Jimmy. Jack leaves baby with picnickers. Håkan to Josefin: Olle left celebrations early with a woman. Einar learns Olle's suspect in robbery. At dockyard Tom remembers Olle. Nina, in helicopter, spots Jack's stolen car. Jack abandons car. Nina lands nearby. She fights and shoots Jack, but he steals her gun. Tom denies knowing Monika. Tom tells Nikolaj where to find Olle. Olle and Nikolaj fight; Olle kills him. Olle disfigures Nikolay's corpse and disposes it beside jetty.
| 4 | 4 | "The Body Bag" (Liksäcken) | Richard Holm | Niclas Ekström, Kjersti Ugelstad | 7 June 2020 |
Olle enters Nikolaj's flat, learns Jimmy's school; finds family photographed previous winter. Police discover Henrik's yacht; mutilated corpse. Palle sells Louise's necklace; pays Axel. Nina meets Einar; trying to view corpse. Tom to Monika: Olle's body bag. Olle phones Einar. Jack to Monika: at boatshed, bring doctor. Olle meets Einar, shows photos; faked death to prevent criminals harming family. Nina to Josefin: body found near Henrik's yacht. Josefin describes Olle's wedding ring. Monika and Tom find Jack. Jack: Tom ran away during heist. Jack: medical care before money. Olle drives to Jimmy's school. Nina collects replacement gun. At Sandefjord, Josefin to Nina: unsure if corpse is Olle. Nina sees Josefin meet Einar. Monika and Tom hijack paramedics. Jack takes over, taken to hospital. Olle saves Jimmy from bullying classmates. Olle takes Jimmy for meal but only has cash. Jimmy walks off. Manager asks for credit card; waitress films Olle driving off. Axel to Palle: more payment. Nina reviews hotel CCTV, sees Monika. Magnus to Nina: footage of Olle. Olle steals another car. Axel and gang torture Palle: blast eardrums. Nina tails Olle. He crashes into her car; escapes. Einar to Josefin: Olle's father, Olle's alive. Olle to Tom: need hideout.
| 5 | 5 | "The Hate" (Hatet) | Richard Holm | Peter Arrhenius, Niclas Ekström, Kjersti Ugelstad | 14 June 2020 |
Tom messages Nikolaj, which Olle reads. Rahmiya announces Jack's capture. Jimmy to Monika: met Olle. Monika: avoid him. Olle and Monika photos published. Olle (as Nikolaj) to Tom: take Olle to Monika's. Tom admits knowing Monika. Palle (partly deaf) brings Lilly to Josefin; asks for money. Josefin tells Palle: Einar's policeman. Monika sees Nikolaj's corpse. Tom takes Olle to Monika's. Olle recognises Monika's photo; interrogates Tom. Learns fellow robbers were Jack and Nikolaj; planned by Monika. Realising Tom will not shoot; Olle leaves. Josefin introduces Lilly to Irene. Irene: Olle left after Brede died, 20 years ago. Olle questions Jack in hospital. Nina and Magnus arrive; Jack's barely conscious. Nina chases Olle across rooves; he falls onto car. He runs off, leaves Nikolaj's licence for Nina. Monika finds Tom inside caravan. Tom returns to dockyard; Palle's attempts blackmail. Tom: help us find Olle. "Nina's Mother" to Josefin: Brede killed during robbery gone wrong. Police visit Nikolaj's flat, see photos. Cassandra to Magnus: patrol car here yesterday. Nina learns Einar's Olle's dad. Olle returns to Irene; meets Lilly. Josefin asks Olle to explain. He shuns Josefin: return home, he never loved her. Police arrive but Olle escapes with help from Einar.
| 6 | 6 | "Mexico" (Mexiko) | Richard Holm | Niclas Ekström, Kjersti Ugelstad | 21 June 2020 |
Josefin does not know where Olle went. Police trail Jack's escape; arrives at boatshed. Leads Monika and Tom to boat; police approach. Jack throws Tom off; Monika drives boat away. Tom captured. Isabelle's customer finds Palle's finger in soup. Isabelle releases Palle from freezer. Jack takes Monica to money, loads it onto boat. Monika kisses Jack as she kills him. Nina wants to follow Monica; instead Magnus recovers Jack's corpse. Tom to police: Ole planned heist, Tom transported equipment, not in heist. Olle met Jack in Mexico. Tom: do not know woman. Monika enters caravan: Olle calls her Victoria. Olle and Monika have sex. Monika: you are Jimmy's dad. Josefin finds Olle's money in new house. Einar to Nina: Monika lives in caravan park. Monika's neighbour Tony remembers number plate. 2007: Olle and Jack on oilrig; 2008: Olle married Victoria in Yucatán. Flashback: Ole, Victoria and Jack plan heist. Current: Henrik knows Palle stole Louise's jewellery; refuses more funding. Tom to police: Victoria/Monika obsessed with Olle. Olle left Monika imprisoned; left Brede when shot. Flashback: Nina sees Olle give gun to Brede. Current: Nina asks mother: Brede's news clippings. Einar investigated Brede's death. Monika collects money, drives Olle and Jimmy.
| 7 | 7 | "The Betrayal" (Sveket) | Richard Holm | Niclas Ekström, Kjersti Ugelstad | 28 June 2020 |
Olle, Monika and Jimmy arrive ashore. At Brede's death site Nina notices problems with Einar's report. She finds another bullet outside. Flashback: Olle waits in car when Victoria enters; she threatens his family if he does not sign out equipment. Current: Nina noties Einar's private gun fired same calibre bullet. She takes Einar to site. Flashback: Olle and Brede break into house, looking for money. Brede's shot by owner, Olle kills owner; left Brede bleeding. Einar removes bullets from owner, shoots owner's corpse. Current: Nina: Einar falsified evidence. Monika, Olle and Jimmy in seaside hut. Monika to Olle: go collect Lilly. Håkan romances Josefin. Olle, Monika and Jimmy return to Sweden. Olle teaches Jimmy to steal car. Henrik notices Håkan changed conference from Gothenburg to Sandefjord via bogus company. Josefin rebuffs Håkan's advances. Olle writes note for waitress: contact police. Monika collects note. Magnus reports Nina to Rahmiya; taken off case. Daniel to Nina: Olle and Monika sighted in Sweden. Henrik and Louise confront Palle: explain invoice for bogus company. Palle starts lying; Louise slaps him. Monika orders Olle drive to quarry where she bashes him. Flashback: In prison Olle tells Victoria: he will leave Mexico. Current: Victoria shoots Olle.
| 8 | 8 | "Dream House" (Drömhuset) | Richard Holm | Niclas Ekström, Kjersti Ugelstad | 5 July 2020 |
MMonika straps Olle into hotel's wheelchair. Monika pays Palle: kidnap Lilly. Drunken Håkan threatens Josefin. Josefin wakes. Lilly gone. Olle to Jimmy: I am your dad. Monika kills hotel maid. Jimmy wheels Olle into stairwell. Olle frees himself, runs off. Nina sees stolen car. Hotel receptionist: Monika booked room. Josefin to Daniel: Lilly's missing. Monika puts gun into Jimmy's backpack. Nina arrests Monika. Josefin: Håkan threatened her. Daniel: no trace of Lilly. Josefin gets kidnapper's message: no police. Nina asks Monika where's Olle. Josefin goes home; Olle arrives. With Daniel following, Olle tells Josefin to stop; Daniel passes. Josefin drives to new house. Palle coaches Lilly: blame Axel for kidnapping. Nina stops Josefin and Olle. Nina threatens Olle; left Brede to die. Jimmy hands Monika's gun back. Monika shoots Nina, takes another gun. Monika drives Olle, Josefin, Jimmy and money to new house. Monika threatens Lilly, orders Olle: nail his feet to floor. Monika lets Palle go. Jimmy leaves car. Palle runs off with stolen money. Jimmy saves Lilly from Monika, who starts shooting. Josefin grabs Monika's other gun; erratically shooting Monika and Jimmy. Nina arrives, hands Josefin's gun to Olle. Palle burns restaurant. Police arrest Olle and Monika.

=== Season 2 ===
| No. overall | No. in season | Title | Directed by | Written by | Original release date |
|---|---|---|---|---|---|
| 9 | 1 | "Hostage" (Gisslan) | Richard Holm | Niclas Ekström, Kjersti Ugelstad | 15 May 2022 |
Josefin relives shootings. Olle consults Annika. Nina arrives as witness. Monika transported with three guards. Jimmy bullied by homophobes; warns Lilly: leave! Jimmy displays bomb vest to Eva-Lena. Josefin readies for court, Daniel arrives: discovers Jimmy's electronic material. Jimmy: bring Olle and Monika; explodes first bomb injuring approaching police. Olle taken from court; Monika's car turned back towards prison. Josefin cuddles Lilly. Jimmy disbelieves Lisa: another bomb. Jimmy phones Monika, who causes collision. Monika escapes, other driver helps guards but truck demolishes prison car. Daniel briefs Olle: get Jimmy to comply. Jimmy: will not release hostages. Olle enters; Jimmy removes Olle's wiretap. Jimmy: bomb-making via Internet. Olle: take Jimmy fishing. Olle to Lisa: Jimmy has bomb vest, holds thumb off switch. Lisa: Monika arriving soon. Olle to Jimmy: Monika's waiting for you. Jimmy: vest on Eva. Palle arrives at school. Students leave building; pause near Eva's car. Olle, Jimmy and Eva leave through another door. Olle drives car, Eva in back seat. Nina approaches collision site. Four bodies inside: one with handcuffs. Nina finds second car; abandoned by Monika. Police follow Olle's GPS; surround their car. Olle leaves car. Lilly phones Jimmy: Monika's dead. Police shoot Jimmy. Eva struggles with vest, which explodes.
| 10 | 2 | "Three Rabbits" (Tre kaniner) | Richard Holm | Niclas Ekström | 15 May 2022 |
Pernilla gives Monika lift to Sweden. Jimmy's hospitalized, unconscious. Olle inducted into Tidaholm prison. Pernilla invites Monika to stay. Erik's due to change prison. Mehmet describes Olle. Olle revolts against "Guard Officer": no phone. Nina to Rahmiya: give my job back, let me hunt Monika. Rahmiya: Monika's dead. Monika impersonates Pernilla. Lilly wakes Josefin: school meeting. Eva-Lena's comatose. Josefin rebuffs Palle. Mehmet asks Olle: conviction files for phone access. Annika and Nina visit Olle. Annika: Jimmy's unconscious, police suspect Josefin helped Jimmy. Josefin's client unhappy with poor service. Daniel introduces Kasper; investigates Josefin's home. Daniel: Jimmy used Tovex, which Laholmen imports. Olle to Nina: do not know whether Monika hid money. Olle asks "Guard" for files. Håkan joins Josefin for drinks. Palle invites Julie to hotel room, discuss buying houses. Lilly's left waiting at home; too late to visit Jimmy. Pernilla and Monika have sex. Olle passes files to Mehmet. Josefin has financial troubles. Lilly phones Palle: mum's drunk. Palle drives Julie, evading police in stolen car. Palle and Julie become engaged. Josefin and Håkan have sex. Palle sells stolen cars to buyers, puts money in safe. Erik visits Olle: 3,000,000 to escape. Olle denies knowing where money went.
| 11 | 3 | "Darkness" (Mörkret) | Richard Holm | Niclas Ekström, Gunnar Svensén | 15 May 2022 |
Palle drives Lilly to school; Josefin's hungover. Nina to Daniel: Monika's in Sweden. Palle no collaboration with Axel on stolen cars. Josefin steals pills and gun from bar owner. Palle drugs Louise; takes hidden money. Erik to Rebecca: accelerate escape plan. Nina to Josefin: Monika's alive. Louise and Manfred replace Josefin by Håkan; Jimmy used Laholmen's Tovex. Josefin takes pills; collects Lilly from school; causes fracas at pool; hurts Lilly. Palle to Reine: list of cars; Elvis delivers cash. Gordon and Kenny bash Olle. Monika stops Pernilla phoning police: locks Pernilla in barn. Monika impersonates Pernilla. Lilly begs Josefin: see doctor. Mehmet to Gordon and Kenny: denies escape. Rebecca to Julie: check Olle and Josefin. Josefin drunk when Daniel and Kasper inspect. Kasper: Lilly into fosterage. Josefin gets drunker. Palle and Julie at Louise's party; impresses with newfound wealth. Olle sees news: Monika in Sweden. Olle to Mehmet: get phone; join escape. Drunken Josefin at party; accosts Palle for Lilly's kidnapping. Mehmet delivers phone to Olle. Drunken Josefin phones foster mother: speak to Lilly; she's asleep. Monika's trails Josefin. Josefin takes overdose. Jimmy wakes. Olle tries calling Josefin. Gordon and Kenny attack Erik. Olle defends Erik: kills both.
| 12 | 4 | "Escape" (Flykten) | Richard Holm | Niclas Ekström, Gunnar Svensén | 15 May 2022 |
Flashback: At trial, Josefin: Olle shot Monika. Josefin has miscarriage. Current: Monika saves Josefin. Magnus interviews Olle: Gordon often fought Kenny; Erik not seen. Olle to Annika: need Nina's phone number. Monika asks Josefin: find Palle. Josefin: first see Lilly. Nina hunts Monika. Josefin asks "Foster Mother" for Lilly. Josefin to Lilly: will do better. "Restaurant Owner" to Nina: Pernilla left with Monika, supplies address. Olle to Mehmet: lost phone. Josefin to Monika: Palle works at fish factory. Palle to Daniel: not involved in stolen cars. Monika suspects Palle took money; recognises Elvis. Josefin to Monika: Jimmy's awake. At Pernilla's: Nina checks Pernilla's food and water. Pernilla: Monika gone for Jimmy. Nina leaves Pernilla locked up. Josefin and Monika enter hospital; bring teddy for Jimmy. Jimmy: Palle let me into Laholmen; Palle gives money to Reine. Kasper cautions Josefin: no unannounced visiting. Jimmy apologises to comatose Eva-Lena. Josefin takes Monika to forest; collaborate to share money from Palle. Monika teaches Josefin to shoot gun. Olle, Erik and Mehmet start riot in sports centre. Motorcyclists arrive outside: cut fence, then bomb inner wall. Olle and Erik escape via motorbikes. Erik: Olle you will pay three million. Olle and Erik tied up, hooded.
| 13 | 5 | "To Death" (Skål för döden) | Richard Holm | Karin Aspenström, Niclas Ekström | 15 May 2022 |
Olle and Erik celebrate escape in Axel's yard. Palle lies to Josefin about Reine. Axel to Olle: money or kill your family. Erik gives Rebecca's phone to Olle. Nina to Rahmiya: lead on Monika. Rahmiya: no unauthorised investigations; desk job or retire. Palle and Elvis meet Reine. Olle phones Nina: help escape bikers. Josefin and Monika kidnap Reine. Daniel to Josefin: Olle out, Monika in Sweden. Josefin to Håkan: rent your warehouse. Erik drives Olle. Axel and henchman follow. Palle threatens Jimmy. Jimmy: told Josefin and Monika about Reine. Josefin and Monika torture Reine. Palle paid Reine to steal luxury cars; has safe in storage hangar. Jimmy to Daniel: Palle threatened to kill me. Daniel asks Palle about Tovex and Reine. Palle tasers Daniel; tells Julie about stolen money. They will elope. Monika to Jimmy: leave through window; meet at warehouse. Håkan stops Monika strangling Reine. Josefin kills Håkan since he's choking Monika. Jimmy sees killings, runs off. Daniel: arrest warrant for Palle. Olle waits for Nina. Erik KOs Henchman. Axel shoots Erik. Nina rescues Olle but Erik dies. Olle and Nina find Jimmy at Josefin's. Nina disables police. Josefin and Monika dispose of Reine and Håkan in harbour.
| 14 | 6 | "A New Life" (Ett nytt liv) | Richard Holm | Karin Aspenström, Niclas Ekström | 15 May 2022 |
Palle enters Louise's; Julie phones Axel. Olle holds gun on Monika; Josefin orders him to release her. Palle's finished packing money. Axel and Palle struggle. Axel wounds Louise; she kills him. Louise orders Palle: leave forever. Olle and Josefin: distrust Monika. Olle asks Jimmy: collect Lilly. Olle colludes with Nina. Julie to Palle: stop for urination. Palle answers Axel's phone: Julie calling. Palle deserts Julie. Louise to Daniel: do not know Palle's whereabouts. Reine and Håkan's bodies discovered. Lilly to Jimmy: Eva died. Palle enters hangar. Elvis sees Olle, Josefin and Monika breaking-in. Palle loads money into safe. Monika overcomes Elvis. Josefin shoots Palle's arm. Nina observes Liam's gang. Elvis tells Palle's code for safe. Liam enters. Olle and women empty safe. Elvis killed by Liam. Nina fires above Olle and women; they escape to Jimmy and Lilly. Jimmy phoned Daniel, who arrives with squad cars. Monika threatens to shoot Jimmy; takes speed boat and escapes. Olle and Josefin leave Lilly with "Foster Mother". Monika's bag: full of rubbish. Jimmy throws gun away, goes to Lilly. Nina has money: Olle swapped bags earlier. Palle hanged. Nina to Olle: money share. Olle and Josefin fly away. Monika returns to Pernilla.
