= Sebastian Ylvenius =

Swedish actor and screenwriter

- Born: 1977 (age 48–49)
- Occupations: Actor; screenwriter

Sebastian Ylvenius (born 1977) is a Swedish actor and screenwriter (2010 film Res dej inte! together with Erik Bolin and Richard Jarnhed). After studying at Gothenburg Theatre Academy 1999–2003 Ylvenius has worked at among Stockholm City Theatre and Bohuslänsteater.

In 2007, he appeared in a production of The Seagull in Vaxholm.

== Selected filmography ==
- 1996 – Drömprinsen – Filmen om Em
- 1997 – Välkommen till festen
- 2003 – Kommissarie Winter (TV)
- 2004 – Fröken Sverige
- 2008 – Beck – Gamen
- 2009 – 183 dagar (TV)
- 2010 – Starke man (TV)
- 2010 – Res dej inte! (and screenwriter)
