= Emilia Roosmann =

Swedish-Norwegian actress (born 1987)

- Born: Siri Anna Emilia Ekstam-Roosman; 19 March 1987 (age 38); Stockholm, Sweden
- Occupation: Actress
- Years active: 2018–present
- Parents: Magnus Roosmann (father); Elisabeth Guttormsen (mother)
- Relatives: Guttorm Guttormsen (stepfather)
- Website: emiliaroosmann.com

Emilia Roosmann (born Siri Anna Emilia Ekstam-Roosmann, 19 March 1987) is a Swedish-Norwegian actress. She has appeared in television series, film and on stage. Roosmann took a lead role in two seasons of Swedish TV crime drama The Machinery (2020, 2022). Her father Magnus Roosmann is a Swedish actor.

== Biography ==
Emilia Roosmann was born on 19 March 1987, in Stockholm. Her father Magnus Roosmann is a Swedish actor, and her mother Elisabeth Guttormsen (née Ekstam) is a costume designer. After her parents divorced, Roosmann moved to Langesund, Norway when her mother remarried to Guttorm Guttormsen a Norwegian theatre musical director, composer and jazz musician. Roosmann attended primary and secondary schools in Langesund, and high school in Porsgrunn. Her first role as a screen actress was "Female friend" in a Swedish drama, romance short film, Dimmiga dar (Foggy Days, 2018). After graduating from Stockholm University of the Arts (2019), Roosmann continued her acting career by joining the ensemble at The National Stage, Bergen (Den Nationale Scene, DNS). She debuted in the title role of Emma Bovary, in Gustave Flaubert's play Madame Bovary, in her first production for DNS.

In television Roosmann has starred in the Swedish action thriller Maskineriet (The Machinery, 2020, 2022) as Monika, playing opposite Kristoffer Joner across two seasons. Her father joined the cast for the second season. In the Swedish drama series, Knutby (The Congregation, 2021), she portrayed Mikaela in season 1. Roosmann also works as a professional voice actress in commercials and animations. In late 2023, Roosmann was part of the ensemble at Folkteatern in Gothenburg, Sweden and participated in Ett Drömspel. She took the role of Linda in Netflix' Swedish thriller mini-series, En helt vanlig familj (A Nearly Normal Family, 2023).

== Filmography ==
Year	Title	Role	Notes
2018	Foggy Days (Dimmiga dar)	"Female friend"	short film
2019	Blinded (Fartblinda)	Polina	TV series
2020, 2022	The Machinery (Maskineriet)	Monika Hansen	TV series
2021	Oblivion's End	Ragna	short film
2021	The Congregation (Knutby)	Mikaela	TV series
2023	A Nearly Normal Family (En helt vanlig familj)	Linda Levander	TV series
