= Puder =

Puder is a surname. Notable people with the surname include:

- Daniel Puder (born 1981), American professional wrestler and mixed martial artist
- Ulf Puder (born 1958), German painter

== See also ==
- Pader (surname)
