= The Hunters (1996 film) =

1996 Swedish thriller film

- Swedish DVD cover
- Directed by: Kjell Sundvall
- Written by: Kjell Sundvall; Björn Carlström
- Produced by: Joakim Hansson; Björn Carlström
- Starring: Rolf Lassgård; Lennart Jähkel; Helena Bergström; Jarmo Mäkinen
- Cinematography: Kjell Lagerroos
- Edited by: Darek Hodor
- Music by: Björn J:son Lindh
- Distributed by: Sonet Film AB
- Release date: 31 January 1996 (Sweden)
- Running time: 118 minutes
- Country: Sweden
- Language: Swedish
- Box office: $6.6 million (Sweden)

The Hunters (Swedish: Jägarna) is a Swedish thriller film directed by Kjell Sundvall, which was released to cinemas in Sweden on 31 January 1996. A police officer from Stockholm moves back to his hometown Älvsbyn in Norrland, in northern Sweden. He starts to work on a long-running reindeer poaching case and soon discovers that his brother is involved.

The film was one of the biggest Swedish box-office hits ever, grossing over $6 million, and received two Guldbagge Awards for Best Direction (Kjell Sundvall) and Best Supporting Actor (Lennart Jähkel). It was also nominated for Best Actor (Rolf Lassgård), Best Cinematography and Best Screenplay.

Hollywood wanted to make a remake of this film, and the American producers wanted it to be about cowboys in the Nevada desert, shooting wild horses for fun. Kjell Sundvall agreed to this at first but later changed his mind.

A sequel, The Hunters 2, premiered in September 2011. A television continuation, The Hunters, of two seasons was broadcast from November 2018.

== Plot ==
Erik (Rolf Lassgård), a Stockholm police officer, reunites with his relatives upon the death of his abusive father in Norrbotten, where his brother Leif (Lennart Jähkel) still lives. We learn that the control the father exerted over the family had resulted in Leif's giving up singing (despite being clearly talented), and instead remaining at home with his father.

Suffering from post-traumatic stress after justifiably killing a man while on duty, Erik has been transferred to the local field office. Erik soon starts to suspect that his brother's friends, led by the half-Finnish Tomme (Jarmo Mäkinen), are involved in large-scale illegal hunting of reindeer and moose. Erik is frustrated by the local police's unwillingness to deal with the problem, but as events unfold he discovers illegal weapons in Tomme's car outside a pub and decides to intervene. Tomme is close to assaulting Erik when he is saved by his brother. It is later revealed that Leif in fact leads the illegal hunting, but has been keeping this a secret from his brother.

The police come under increasing pressure as the local community grows more angry that the poaching case has not been solved. Erik continues to spy on Tomme, and after breaking into his house, discovers illegal guns and numerous animal carcasses. Before Erik can alert his colleagues, he is attacked and knocked unconscious.

Leif decides to suspend operations until further notice because of the increased police interest in the case. Several members of the gang are unhappy about this, as they have taken on large financial commitments such as car loans. Pursuing a big raid to recover the lost income, Tomme accidentally shoots and kills a Russian bilberry worker. Another bilberry worker witnesses the dumping of the victim's body and car in a lake. Leif chases her and fatally slits her throat. Unaware that the murder of the woman has been seen by Ove, a kind but intellectually disabled childhood friend of Erik's, the five men decide to keep silent instead of going to the police.

Erik suspects his brother is hiding something. Erik intervenes when the gang racially and sexually harasses a Filipina barmaid, Nena, at the local bar. Later, Erik and Nena spend the night together. Erik leaves Nena in the house while he attends a ceremony to receive an award for having returned to his hometown. While Erik is out, Leif and his gang arrive at the house and, after verbally abusing Nena, they rape her on the kitchen table. Nena then disappears, and it is later revealed that she returned to the Philippines. Erik, meanwhile, tries to have Tomme's wife betray her husband and tell him something, but she refuses.

Upon the arrival of a female prosecutor from Stockholm (Helena Bergström), the body of the Russian woman is found. With information from Ove, the police find the body of the male Russian, with a fragment of the bullet lodged within it. Erik tells Ove to stay inside and keep his door locked, but Leif and the others, having been tipped off by Erik's police partner that Ove is the witness, arrive at Ove's house and take him out in the woods for what they say is a hunting trip but is in fact an execution.

Erik and prosecutor Anna arrive too late, as the gang has "accidentally" shot Ove. A short time before, Erik had found out that Ove was his and Leif's half-brother.

Unable to prove that Ove was murdered, Erik is forced to find the rifle used to shoot the Russian to secure a conviction for this killing. In a final stand-off Erik is fired at and nearly killed by Tomme, but Erik manages to hit Tomme with an iron bar. Tomme is arrested.

Leif gives Erik 200,000 Kronor (which is his share of their father's estate) and asks Erik to let him turn himself in. Erik agrees, giving him one hour to do so and then leaves. Rather than turn himself in, Leif then kills himself by blowing up their childhood house. Erik returns to Stockholm, trying to pursue another life than that which his father and his brother had attempted.

== Cast ==
- Rolf Lassgård as Erik
- Lennart Jähkel as Leif
- Jarmo Mäkinen as Tomme
- Tomas Norström as Ove
- Göran Forsmark as Håkan
- Rolf Degerlund as Eilert
- Editha Domingo as Nena
- Helena Bergström as Anna
- Thomas Hedengran as Stig
- Roland Hedlund as Bengtsson
- Ove Tjernberg as Söderberg
- Åke Lindman as Chefen
