= Miss Sweden (film) =

- Theatrical release poster
- Swedish: Fröken Sverige
- Directed by: Tova Magnusson-Norling
- Written by: Sara Kadefors
- Produced by: Lena Rehnberg
- Starring: Alexandra Dahlström; Sissela Kyle; Magnus Roosmann; Sverrir Gudnason; Leo Hallerstam; Sebastian Ylvenius; Oldoz Javidi
- Cinematography: Anders Bohman
- Edited by: Ewa J. Lind
- Music by: Anders Engström
- Production companies: Film i Väst; Ekstranda; SVT
- Distributed by: Sandrew Metronome
- Release date: 3 September 2004 (Sweden)
- Running time: 92 minutes
- Country: Sweden
- Language: Swedish

Miss Sweden (Swedish: Fröken Sverige) is a 2004 Swedish drama film directed by Tova Magnusson-Norling. The film stars Alexandra Dahlström, Sissela Kyle, Magnus Roosmann, Sverrir Gudnason, Leo Hallerstam, Sebastian Ylvenius and Oldoz Javidi.

== Premise ==
Moa lives by herself in a cottage in the forest and has a dead-end job in a toilet paper factory. She is trying to find herself. Although her job offers little chance of career development, she has a talent for computer layouts and photography; she is an activist for causes such as veganism and anti-capitalism, accompanying her friends on demonstrations, but it seems that she may be doing this just to fit in. When at home, by herself, she listens to commercial pop music and wears make-up. As the story progresses, it transpires that she lacks self-esteem, and is used and abused by what she takes to be her friends. Men are happy to have sex with her, but dump her soon afterwards. She begins to gain self-confidence as she comes into contact with Jens, a troubled teenager whom the local authorities have entrusted to Moa's parents, perennial foster parents and do-gooders, to look after.

== Cast ==
- Alexandra Dahlström as Moa
- Sissela Kyle as Iris
- Magnus Roosmann as Bengt
- Sverrir Gudnason as Conny
- Sebastian Ylvenius as André
- Oldoz Javidi as Kim
- Leo Hallerstam as Jens
- Eva-Lotta Helmersson as Vanna
- Michaela Berner as Josefin
- Matias Varela as Hector
- Peter Viitanen as Ola
- Figge Norling as Hantverkare
- Felix Fröjd as Vincent

== Awards ==
For her role as Moa, Dahlström won the Best Young Actress from the Northern Countries (Bester Jungdarstellerin aus nordischen Ländern) in the Undine Film Awards in Austria.
