= False Trail =

2011 Swedish film by Kjell Sundvall

- Theatrical release poster
- Directed by: Kjell Sundvall
- Written by: Björn Carlström; Stefan Thunberg
- Produced by: Peter Possne; Per Janérus; Björn Carlström
- Starring: Rolf Lassgård; Peter Stormare
- Cinematography: Jallo Faber
- Edited by: Mattias Morheden
- Music by: Johan Söderqvist
- Production company: Sonet Film AB
- Distributed by: Svensk Filmindustri
- Release date: 2 September 2011 (Sweden)
- Running time: 129 minutes
- Country: Sweden
- Language: Swedish

False Trail (Swedish: Jägarna 2, "The Hunters 2"), is a Swedish thriller film which was released to cinemas in Sweden on 2 September 2011, directed by Kjell Sundvall with Rolf Lassgård and Peter Stormare in the main roles. The film is the sequel to the 1996 film The Hunters, it sneak-premiered on 17 August 2011 in Överkalix and in Norrland on 2 September 2011 and had its main all over Sweden premiere on 9 September 2011.

Unlike the first film, where the title pointed to the villainous hunters, the title of the sequel hints towards the feud between Erik and Torsten, both with their own predatory nature. A television continuation, The Hunters, of two seasons was broadcast from November 2018.

== Premise ==
15 years after the events of the first film, Erik (Rolf Lassgård) is forced to return to the Norrland village he had left following the events of the first film, after a brutal crime is committed.

== Cast ==
- Rolf Lassgård as Erik Bäckström
- Peter Stormare as Torsten
- Annika Nordin as Karin Johansson
- Kim Tjernström as Peter
- Lo Kauppi as Johanna Lager
- Jesper Barkselius as Åström
- Eero Milonoff as Jari Lipponen
- Johan Paulsen as Mats
- Ellenor Lindgren as Elin Ledin
- Olov Häggmark as Hempo
- Jonas Hedlund as Niklas
- Yngve Dahlberg as Erik's boss
- Juho Milonoff as Esa Lipponen

== Production ==
The film's director started filming in August 2010 on location in Överkalix and Kalix in the upper-north part of Sweden.
