= Roshana Hosseini =

Swedish singer (born 1993)

Roshana
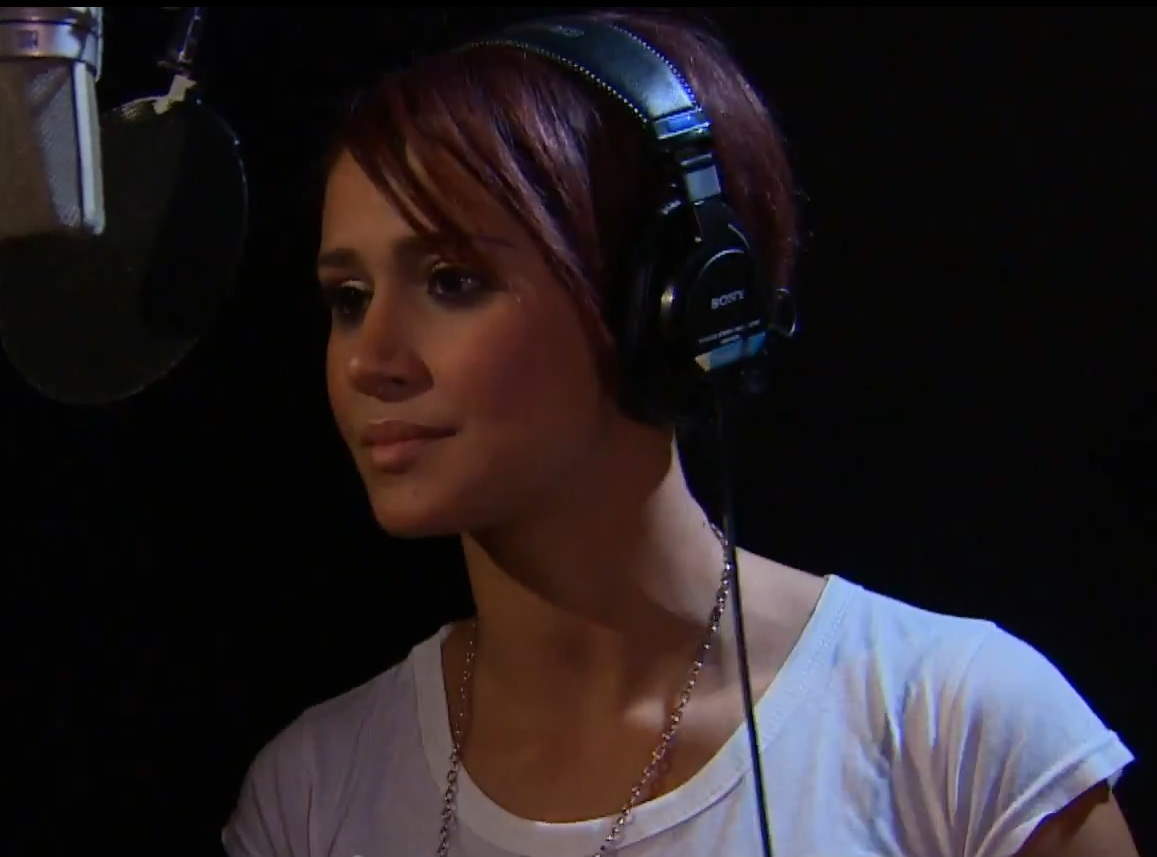

Background information
- Born: Roshanak Hosseini; 10 January 1993 (age 32); Falun, Sweden
- Genres: Pop
- Occupations: Singer, songwriter
- Years active: 2007–present
- Website: Roshana

Roshanak Hosseini (born 10 January 1993), also known as Roshana Hoss, is a Swedish pop singer and songwriter.

== Biography ==
Roshana was born in Falun to Iranian parents. She was a member of pop group Love Generation until November 2010. From 2020 Hosseini has also worked as an actress (as Roshi Hoss) appearing in TV series Morden i Sandhamn (2021) and The Machinery (2022).
