= The Hunters (TV series) =

Swedish crime drama television series

- Created by: Björn Carlström, Stefan Thunberg
- Inspired by: The Hunters; False Trail
- Screenplay by: Björn Carlström; Stefan Thunberg; Jimmy Nivrén Olsson; Anders Sparring; Maria Nygren
- Directed by: Jens Jonsson, Johan Lundin
- Starring: Rolf Lassgård; Johan Marenius Nordahl; Annika Nordin; Caroline Johansson Kuhmunen; Johannes Kuhnke
- Country of origin: Sweden
- Original languages: Swedish, English
- No. of series: 2
- No. of episodes: 12

Production
- Running time: 45 minutes

Original release
- Network: C More, TV4
- Release: 14 November – 12 December 2018
- Release: 8 March – 12 April 2021

Jägarna (English: The Hunters) is a Swedish crime drama TV series, which was broadcast on C More and TV4 from 14 November 2018. The first season of six episodes was filmed in Älvsbyn, Norrbotten County with Jens Jonsson and Johan Lundin directing. It was created by Björn Carlström and Stefan Thunberg who were also its main script writers. Appearing in both seasons, Rolf Lassgård reprises his lead role as Erik Bäckström from Swedish films The Hunters (Swedish: Jägarna, 1996) and False Trail (a.k.a. The Hunters 2 or Swedish: Jägarna 2, 2011). Carlström co-wrote both films while Thunberg co-wrote False Trail. Erik is a retired policeman who unofficially investigates a local murder involving mining company boss Markus (Pelle Heikkilä). The second season of six episodes began on 8 March 2021 with Jonsson and Lundin directing and Carlström and Thunberg as main script writers. Erik re-investigates the 2005 murder of a local woman, which Erik had ascribed to her boyfriend Joar (Simon J. Berger). Lassgård is joined across both seasons by Johan Marenius Nordahl, who portrays Erik's nephew and rookie policeman Peter, Annika Nordin, who reprises her False Trail role as Peter's mother Karin, and Caroline Johansson Kuhmunen as Peter's love interest (later wife) Liza.

== Cast and characters ==
- Rolf Lassgård as Erik Bäckström: Peter's uncle; former Stockholm police detective with National Operations Department (NOD). Retired and returned to hometown Älvsbyn. Owns pet dog, Bella. In 2018, briefly became security chief for North Wolf Mining (NWM), but resigned to unofficially investigate murder of Johannes. In 2020 he re-investigates 2005 murder of Therese, when her convicted killer Joar is released after new evidence is discovered
- Johan Marenius Nordahl as Peter Bäckström: Erik's nephew, Leif and Karin's son, Liza's partner. Rookie uniform policeman who becomes fully qualified officer. Father of Leah
- Annika Nordin as Karin Johansson: Peter's mother, Karl's love interest
- Caroline Johansson Kuhmunen as Liza: Peter's partner. Mother of Leah, becomes bar owner
- Johannes Kuhnke as Måns Richardsson: Älvsbyn police officer, Peter's supervisor. After his imprisonment he becomes a heavy drinker before Erik recruits him to investigate Joar

=== Season one only ===
- Pelle Heikkilä as Markus Lindmark: Karl's brother, Rebecka's father, NWM boss. Target of assault, death threats
- Anna Azcárate as Ragnhild: Älvsbyn councillor
- Ia Langhammer as Sanna Östergren: police chief, Måns and Peter's boss
- Sampo Sarkola as Karl Lindmark: Markus' brother, Karin's love interest, NWM co-owner
- Pasi Haapala as Tord: weightlifter, Markus' bodyguard-henchman
- Albin Grenholm as Benjamin Abrahamsson: sometime poacher, threatens, attacks Markus
- Amalia Holm as Rebecka Lindmark: Markus' daughter, stalked by Benjamin
- Mikael Ersson as Johannes Fresk: Petrographic analyst for Markus' company
- Josette Simon as Ayanda Moganedi: South African mining CEO, considers investing in NWM

=== Season two only ===
- Simon J. Berger as Joar Särn: Therese's former boyfriend, drug dealer, convicted of Therese's murder in 2005, falsely confesses in 2020, escapes into forest, gets retrial
- Lena Endre as Niki Thompson: Stockholm-based prosecutor who helped convict Joar, becomes Erik's love interest
- Ulf Stenberg as Pål Lundkvist: Therese's brother, Cissi's lover, timber mill worker
- Pablo Leiva Wenger as Sergio: police chief, Peter's boss
- Maja Rung as Ida Särn: Joar's younger sister, petrol station attendant
- Jeanette Holmgren as Ylva Östberg: Linus' mother, hunter, timber mill owner
- Maria Sundström as Therese Lundkvist: 2005 murder victim, Joar's ex-girlfriend
- Peter Mörlin as Linus Östberg: Ylva's son, timber mill operator, Pål's boss, former national ice hockey aspirant
- Bert Gradin as Lennart Lundkvist: Therese and Pål's father, Elisabeth's husband
- Simeon Lindgren as Jallo: timber mill worker, Pål's friend
- Inger Nilsson as Gunilla Särn: Joar and Ida's mother; implicated Joar in Therese's murder; seriously ill
- Hugo Florén as Unga (English: "Young") Erik: 14-year-old boy, lives with his brother Lief and their abusive father
- Ville Florén as Unga (English: "Young") Leif: Erik's younger brother
- Anna Söderling as Elisabeth Lundkvist: Therese and Pål's mother, Lennart's wife
- Maria Forslin as Cissi: Linus ex-wife, becomes Pål's lover
- Leah Berglund as Leah: Peter and Liza's daughter, Erik's grandniece, Karin's granddaughter

== Production ==
Filming of The Hunters (Jägarna) season one began in autumn 2018. It is set and filmed in Älvsbyn and surrounding Norrbotten County, with some interior scenes shot in Stockholm. It was made for C More and TV4 and inspired by two popular Swedish films The Hunters (Jägarna, 1996) and False Trail (a.k.a. The Hunters 2 or Jägarna 2, 2011). Both were directed by Kjell Sundvall, with The Hunters (1996) co-written by Sundvall and Björn Carlström and False Trail was co-written by Carlström and Stefan Thunberg. Carlström and Thunberg co-created the TV series and are its principal scriptwriters with Jens Jonsson and Johan Lundin directing.

== Episode guide ==
=== Season one ===
| No. overall | No. in season | Title | Directed by | Written by | Original release date |
|---|---|---|---|---|---|
| 11 | 1 | "Episode 1" (Avsnitt 1) | Jens Jonsson | Björn Carlström, Stefan Thunberg | 14 November 2018 |
Ragnhild announces funding cutbacks. Markus, Karl and Johannes take core samples containing gold. Karl and Karin observe Erik calling for Bella. Karl informs investors of international interests. Markus and Karl soothe Ragnhild's concerns about development. Ayanda requires railway to Narvik. Ragnhild ignorant of arsenic levels. Markus suspects protestors when car shot by steel sphere. Måns and Peter attend scene. Karin introduces Markus and Karl to Erik. Rebecka reads shooting news. Erik to Peter: shooter's not environmentalist. Erik points Måns and Sunna towards shed near scene. Sunna orders Erik: let police investigate. In shed, Erik sees bomb-making instructions, steel spheres. Erik's chased off by arrow. Peter and Måns: shed's empty. Erik advises Peter: check local arrow-related activity. Benjamin monitors Rebecka's phone calls. Markus and Johannes argue: contamination negatively affecting Sámi. Markus finds deer carcass. Erik recovers steel sphere inside it, advises Markus to relocate. Markus hires Tord. Peter discovers Benjamin's uses arrows. Erik visits Benjamin whose mother Ulla's confused; Benjamin escapes. Johannes cannot support Markus anymore. Markus and Ayanda videoconference. Johannes steals documents, cycles off. Erik tells Peter of Benjamin's bombs. Markus deliberately knocks Johannes off bike. Karl and Tord arrive; Markus kills Johannes. Erik tells Markus about Benjamin; accepts NWM job offer.
| 2 | 2 | "Episode 2" (Avsnitt 2) | Jens Jonsson | Björn Carlström, Stefan Thunberg | 14 November 2018 |
Teens discover Johannes' corpse. Karin and Peter struggle with finances. Karl and Tord remove evidence. Sanna warns Markus about Benjamin's bomb plot. Markus cannot cancel proposed investor meeting; asks police for protection. Markus took over Benjamin's father's company; father suicided. Johannes' wife Viktoria: Johannes did not return home. CCTV shows Johannes cycling from NWM. Erik and Ragnhild start dating. Måns and Peter attend corpse: hit-and-run. Markus provides Erik with roof tiles. Erik informs Markus of Johannes' death. Karl's affected by witnessing death: binge drinking. Markus and Karl console Viktoria. Peter asks Erik to visit crime scene. Erik asks for Johannes' backpack: not at scene. Benjamin hides in forest. Sanna informs Peter that Erik was fired. Markus claims to Måns: at NWM all evening but Erik remembers arriving there: NWM empty. Erik explains to Peter: resigned after testifying about colleague's unsafe interviews; suspect released. Erik informs Peter: Markus lied about Johannes' death. Markus provides Peter and Liza's mortgage. Tord sabotages NWM's office with timed bomb while townsfolk meet with Ayanda. Erik notices Markus' car's repairs. Tord: hand CCTV to police on Monday. Erik returns to NWM, breaks into CCTV archive; tries copying film: Markus following Johannes. Bomb explodes, Erik injured.
| 3 | 3 | "Episode 3" (Avsnitt 3) | Jens Jonsson, Johan Lundin | Björn Carlström, Stefan Thunberg | 21 November 2018 |
Erik wakes in hospital. Markus guides Ayanda's team on bear hunt. Erik tells Sanna and Måns: Benjamin not Benjamin. Erik tells Peter: Markus followed Johannes, Tord planted bomb. Police search Benjamin's place, disturb Ulla. Erik discharges himself; attends bear hunt, meets Ayanda. Erik and Ragnhild kiss. Karl takes cocaine; wounds bear. Armed police arrive at Benjamin's building; use smoke bombs, kill deer. At Markus' lodge, shoots fired from nearby. Benjamin disables transmitter tower. Erik finds GPS tracker under Markus' car. Måns asks Peter how Erik knew bomber was not Benjamin. Peter does not reveal observations. Benjamin takes Ragnhild hostage; wants swap with Markus. Tord's tyres punctured by caltrops. Erik advises Markus: remain inside lodge. Erik takes his place. Benjamin threatens Ragnhild, Erik convinces Benjamin: Markus' tracker shows Markus killed Johannes. Tord knocks out Benjamin. Tord tells Markus: Benjamin's computer shows Markus' guilt. Måns overhears Peter and Erik: discussing freeing Benjamin. Måns orders Peter to follow legal procedures. Tord walks Benjamin along road, cuts himself, cuts Benjamin's ropes. Erik prevents Tord shooting Benjamin; disarms Tord. Måns and Peter warn Erik off. Tord kills Benjamin, claims defending police. Markus congratulates Peter. Erik accuses Markus of murder. Ayanda confirms her company's investment.
| 4 | 4 | "Episode 4" (Avsnitt 4) | Jens Jonsson, Johan Lundin | Björn Carlström, Stefan Thunberg, Jimmy Nivrén Olsson | 28 November 2018 |
Måns directs Peter to inform Ulla of Benjamin's death. Erik and Ragnhild have sex. Ragnhild asks Erik to leave Markus alone. Sanna sends Måns home for not requesting backup before tackling Benjamin. Karl refuses to help Erik get Markus. Police hold press conference detailing Benjamin's death. Markus asks Måns for Benjamin's computer. Karl tries to convince Karin of Erik's incompetence. Karin realizes Karl's on drugs; they break up. Markus accommodates Karl. Erik finds Benjamin's computer at Ulla's. Måns arrives confiscates computer from Erik. Peter tells Erik that Måns' on sick leave. Karin finds Karl's burnt clothes. Karl and Markus fight, Karl leaves. Måns gives Benjamin's computer to Markus. Erik breaks in. Markus orders Tord to steal computer. Karl cuts Erik's forearm; Erik leaves Karl injured. Markus rebuffs Ragnhild's accusations as baseless. Tord finds injured Karl, who is hospitalized. Tord and Måns search house; cannot find computer. Erik treats his wound. Måns stops Erik's car for speeding but Erik refuses to allow Måns search it. Erik drives off. Peter finds Erik was at fight scene. Karin treats Erik's wound. Karin learns of Karl's injuries. Peter arrives to ask Erik to confess. Erik says he needs time otherwise Markus escapes justice.
| 5 | 5 | "Episode 5" (Avsnitt 5) | Jens Jonsson, Johan Lundin | Björn Carlström, Stefan Thunberg | 5 December 2018 |
Sanna interviews Karin. Erik sends Bernjamin's computer to forensics GPS shows Markus' car near Johannes' corpse. Karl's comatose. Erik describes CCTV footage to Ragnhild. Ragnhild wanted Markus' project for town's prosperity; breaks up with Erik. Måns alerts Markus: his car's being examined. Erik promises Peter he will confess to assaulting Karl. Markus' questioned about GPS by police. Markus changes statement: Karl drove Markus' car while intoxicated, Karl returned later very stressed. Markus admits to lying for Karl's sake. Erik leaves upon learning that Markus implicated Karl. Måns tells Sanna: Karl was driver. At hospital, Måns keeps look out as Markus injects Karl's neck. Erik, Peter and Karin learn Karl's dead. Erik informs Ragnhild – Erik feels responsible. Markus tells Karin about Karl killing Johannes. Karin tells Markus that Erik assaulted Karl. Erik loads his rifle, contemplates suicide but shoots injured deer instead. Peter tells Sanna of Erik's observations. Sanna urges Erik to provide official statement at station. Markus asks Måns to work as NWM security chief. Måns arrests Erik but drives Erik to Markus' lodge. Tord ransacks Erik's place. Peter sees Erik's clothes missing. Måns offloads Erik to Tord. Erik warns Tord will murder him. Nurse hands Karl's effects to Karin.
| 6 | 6 | "Episode 6" (Avsnitt 6) | Jens Jonsson | Björn Carlström, Stefan Thunberg | 12 December 2018 |
Peter to Sanna: Erik assaulted Karl. Måns interviews Peter. Tord cannot find Erik's wallet; locks up Erik. Tord phones Måns: find Erik's wallet. Måns and Sanna search Erik's place. Erik cuts ties. Måns discovers Erik's wallet. Peter finds Erik's bandage in police car. Tord takes Erik at gunpoint. Erik begs for his life but stabs Tord, runs off. Tord chases Erik. Peter checks police car's kilometers, Måns admits driving last night. Måns assaults Peter; destroys Erik's bandage. Karin asks doctor: new toxic test on Karl. Måns gives Erik's wallet to Markus. Tord, Markus and Måns hunt Erik. Sanna suspends Peter on Måns' advice. Tord follows Erik towards lodge; Marcus alerted. Måns confronts Erik but submits his rifle. Erik and Markus struggle. Erik falls down mine pit, Tord saves Markus, shoots Erik. Peter clears desk, leaves with gun. Peter and Bella search for Erik. Peter finds Erik's wallet inside Tord's excavator. Bella leads Peter to mine. Peter meets Tord. Erik blows dog whistle. Tord notices wallet's gone, grabs pistol. Peter kills Tord, revives Erik. Peter tells Sanna: Måns' corrupt. Markus signs mining agreement. Erik makes statement to Sanna; police arrest Markus. Peter reinstated as full officer. Erik recovers with a limp.

=== Season two ===
| No. overall | No. in season | Title | Directed by | Written by | Original release date |
|---|---|---|---|---|---|
| 7 | 1 | "Episode 1" (Avsnitt 1) | Jens Jonsson | Björn Carlström, Stefan Thunberg | 8 March 2021 |
Joar confesses to Niki: killed Therese with knife. Peter, Karin, Liza and Leah lunch with Erik. Niki phones Erik: she's bringing Joar to find Therese's corpse. Erik alerts Lundkvists of Joar. Ida displays news poster regarding Joar's confession. Erik introduces Niki to Peter and Sergio. Peter reads Joar's file to Liza. Peter's team drive into forest. Erik, Sergio, Ylva and Linus join hunt. Karin provides Gunilla's in-home care. Peter forces Joar to spit out lolly. Joar leads group into forest to site. Erik and Ylva discuss logging his pines. Peter and crew remove surrounding rubble; Joar escapes. Site has deer skeleton. Peter runs after Joar; crew and Niki left behind. Ylva details her hunting history. Sergio and Erik drive to Niki's location. Despite Sergio's advice, Erik follows Peter; he notices discarded bolt cutter, receipt. Peter follows Joar towards firefront. Erik unable to reach Peter via walkie-talkie. Peter, with gun, approaches Joar. When Peter gets close enough, Joar attacks, disarms Peter. Joar puts gun in Peter's mouth, fires gun nearby; Peter frightened. Erik runs toward gun fire; finds Peter, who claims he gave warning shot. Firefighters see Joar run past. Erik and Peter approach firefront. Pål berates Peter for losing Joar.
| 8 | 2 | "Episode 2" (Avsnitt 2) | Jens Jonsson | Björn Carlström, Anders Sparring, Stefan Thunberg | 15 March 2021 |
Flashback: Ida writes to Joar: Grandma described husband's affair with Erik's mother Anna. Present: Receipt indicates Ida bought Joar's material. Ida visited Joar after Grandma's death. Erik discovers Ida's quad bike's missing. Peter has nightmares about Joar. Peter lies to Sergio: 70 m from Joar; denies being traumatized. Joar maybe armed. Erik and Niki have sex. Police discover Therese's corpse in hidden cellar of house burnt in forest fire. Erik and Niki attend scene. Erik explains to Lundkvists: Therese was shot. Liza's concerned about Peter's restlessness. When Erik returns home, Joar shoots at him. Erik fires back, tries to talk down Joar. Peter and Leah arrive. Erik disarms himself, persuades Peter to leave. Leah sees Joar through window. Erik attempts convincing Joar to phone Niki. Joar tells Erik about Anna's affair. Joar believes that's why Erik assembled case against him. Flashback: Erik and Leif see Anna's corpse. Present: Leah indicates she saw Joar. Erik realizes Joar did not know how Therese was shot. Sergio phones Erik; Joar lets Erik answer. Peter, Sergio and police are at Erik's farm. Erik disarms Joar; takes him out to police. Erik returns Peter's gun. Erik to Niki: Joar did not kill Therese, but Niki's unconvinced.
| 9 | 3 | "Episode 3" (Avsnitt 3) | Johan Lundin | Björn Carlström, Maria Nygren, Stefan Thunberg | 22 March 2021 |
Joar released pending new trial. Lundkvists hold Therese's funeral; Elisabeth castigates Erik for abandoning them. Erik and Niki live together. Gunilla awkwardly greets Joar. Ida advises Joar to keep low profile but he demurs. Linus refuses to hire Joar. Joar interrupts Liza's Bar opening. Erik convinces Joar to drink outside. Joar blames Therese's death on Pål's infatuation. Their meeting's disrupted by hand-grenade. Peter says it's a replica. Joar should move away. Peter unconvinced that Joar deserves protection. Erik reads Joar's investigation file; he convinced Gunilla to changer her testimony. Erik asks Måns about Therese. Måns interviewed witness who saw Joar in fores. Joar did not have enough time to hide corpse. Erik collects Måns' notebooks. Customers refuse Ida's service. Cissi tells Peter: Joar inherited rifle from grandfather. Erik and Måns compare house Therese found with 2005 photos: lino hides trapdoor. Murderer knew about trapdoor; hid Therese after police search. Pål and Joar fight at Liza's bar. Pål and friends take injured Joar to van. Liza lies to Erik: Joar left earlier. Pål, Jallo and Linus beating Joar. Erik discovers Joar; reports to Sergio. Liza: no trouble between Joar and Pål. Peter cleans evidence of fight at Liza's Bar.
| 10 | 4 | "Episode 4" (Avsnitt 4) | Johan Lundin | Björn Carlström, Anders Sparring, Stefan Thunberg | 29 March 2021 |
Erik reads forensic report from Niki's folder: Therese had broken finger days before her death. Lennart: Therese had no broken finger before disappearance. Jallo and his brother Reino escape sabotaged car. Erik and Måns talk with Joar. Joar admits to slapping Therese while arguing about Joar's selling steroids to Jallo and Reino. Erik queries Ylva about Reino's accident. Ylva claims Reino climbed log stack, which collapsed. Ida fired by her boss. Peter does not believe Joar's version of events. Case of Joar being assaulted is closed. Karin: Leah missing from kindergarten. Peter finds Leah near river, believes Joar took her. Peter and policewoman search Joar's home for rifle. Peter sees Joar's racy photos of former girlfriends, including Liza. Joar and Ida argue. Joar scoffs and outrages Ida and Gunilla when he claims he cut Therese into pieces. Måns takes Erik to barn, which had Joar's drugs cache. They find rifle and drugs down a well. Erik attends Leah's birthday party. Peter cannot release hatred for Joar, argues with Erik, points gun at Erik. Erik asks Joar about his encounter with Peter in forest. Erik threatens Joar with weapon; leave Peter, Leah and Liza alone. Police arrest Joar.
| 11 | 5 | "Episode 5" (Avsnitt 5) | Johan Lundin | Björn Carlström, Maria Nygren, Stefan Thunberg | 5 April 2018 |
Stockholm investigator Ulrika and Peter question Joar. Joar claims he took grandfather's rifle but never used it. Karin tells Peter she loved Leif but never knew his criminal activities. Måns keeps Erik focussed on investigation. Lennart hospitalized after heart attack. Erik and Peter briefly resolve differences. Måns phones Erik: he's figured it out. Peter reads Karin's letter to Leif; Karin was raped. Erik finds Måns shot dead. Sergio tells Peter: Måns talked to Joar at petrol station. Erik tells Peter: Joar did not kill Måns. Peter ignores Erik. Police trail Joar to motel cabin. Erik meets Reino's ex-girlfriend Agnes. Agnes told Therese about Reino's steroids. Ylva ordered accident covered up. Joar escapes Peter. Erik finds Måns' notebooks. Liza tells Pål: Joar killed Måns. Erik reads Måns' note: researching 1970s hunting team. Pål confronts Erik: sees Erik's note about Joar; calls in three thugs. Pål burns notebooks, leaves. Liza admits Joar was former lover. Niki shows CCTV of Joar and Måns. Erik uses Måns' map of Joar's locations; heads to abandoned military base. Erik passes Jallo's roadblock. Erik and Joar discuss their relatives' affair. Erik asks about hunting party; Joar describes young Ylva. Receptionist confirms Ylva's alibi but not Linus'.
| 12 | 6 | "Episode 6" (Avsnitt 6) | Jens Jonsson | Björn Carlström, Stefan Thunberg | 12 April 2018 |
Lennart dies, Pål takes handgun, drives to Jallo. Ylva prevents Erik questioning Linus. Jallo tells Pål about military base. Niki shows hunting group photo: Ylva and trapdoor visible. Niki asks Erik to bring Joar for witness statement. Pål captures Joar, starts torture. Erik approaches, Pål aims at Erik. Joar stabs Pål's thigh. Erik and Joar carry Pål to car. Erik arrives at hospital. Joar staggers away with Pål's gun. Peter runs after Joar. Both point guns at each other, Erik tries to diffuse situation. Joar drops gun; Peter kills Joar. Niki and Erik interview Ylva. She admits being in photo. Erik learns Peter lied to internal affairs: Joar did not drop weapon. Erik confirms Peter's version. Karin asks Erik to reconcile with Peter; Erik says its Peter's call. Flashback: Erik protects Leif: threatens to shoot their father. Sawmill workers celebrate at Liza's Bar. Peter asks Erik to leave; Pål has Erik stay. Jallo confirms Linus was using steroids. Erik describes how Linus beat Reino but covered up by Ylva. Later Linus brutally assaulted Therese; Ylva killed Therese to protect Linus. Linus apologises to Pål. Peter's aware he killed an innocent man. Ida returns to job. Ylva found guilty of murder.
