= Magnus Roosmann =

Swedish actor (born 1963)

Nils Magnus Roosmann (born Bjurström; 11 June 1963 in Söder in Stockholm (grew up in Lessebo)) is a Swedish actor.

Roosmann studied at the Swedish National Academy of Mime and Acting and after that he has been engaged at Wasa Theatre in Vaasa, Finland, Malmö Opera and Music Theatre, Uppsala City Theatre and the Royal Dramatic Theatre. In film he has played well known roles.

Roosmann has also read audiobooks. His daughter Emilia Roosmann is a television and theatre actress.

== Filmography ==
Year	Title	Role	Notes
1993	Härifrån till Kim	Signore	
1994	Tre kronor	Ruben Liljedahl	2 episodes
1994-1999	Rederiet	Fredrik Westberg / Domare	13 episodes
1995-1997	Radioskugga	Jonny	14 episodes
1998	Beck	Gert Ahlgren	Episode: "Monstret"
2000	Brottsvåg	Per Johansson	Episode: "Thors requiem"
2000	Soldater i månsken	Contractor	3 episodes
2001	Executive Protection	Fredrixon	
2001	Kommissarie Winter	Bolger	2 episodes
2001	Gustav III:s äktenskap	Master of the Horse Munck	TV movie
2001	Röd jul	Johansson	TV Short
2002	Olivia Twist	Bilägare	Episode: "Del 3"
2002	Stora teatern	Magnus	4 episodes
2003	Ramona	Samuel Johansson	2 episodes
2003	Dieten	Henrik	Short
2003	Utan dig		Short
2003	Arven	Alfred	
2003	Evil	Tosse Berg	
2003	Illusive Tracks	Henry	
2004	Framom främsta linjen	Wennberg	
2004	Miss Sweden	Bengt	
2006	When Darkness Falls	Polis Johansson	
2009	Det enda rationella	Reverend Roger Dahm	
2009	Wallander	Jens Riis	Episode: "Cellisten"
2011	Kronjuvelerna	Mr. Wallinder	
2011	Någon annanstans i Sverige	Erik	
2012	Johan Falk: Kodnamn: Lisa	Advokat Fredrixon	
2013	Victoria	Ottos far	
2013	Echoes from the Dead	Landsfiskalen Henriksson	
2013	LasseMajas detektivbyrå - Von Broms hemlighet	Ronny Hazelwood	
2013	Nobody Owns Me	Lennart	
2014	Gentlemen	Jazzbaronen	
2014	LasseMajas detektivbyrå - Skuggor över Valleby	Ronny Hazelwood	
2019	Quick	Christer van der Kwast	
2021	Young Royals	Duke Ludvig	
2022	The Machinery	Erik	6 episodes

== Audiobooks ==
- 2008 - The Hard Way
- 2007 - One Shot
- 2005 - The Lincoln Lawyer
