= A Nearly Normal Family =

2023 Swedish drama television series

- Promotional poster
- Genre: Drama
- Based on: A Nearly Normal Family by M.T. Edvardsson
- Written by: Hans Jörnlind; Anna Platt
- Directed by: Per Hanefjord
- Starring: Alexandra Karlsson Tyrefors; Lo Kauppi; Björn Bengtsson
- Country of origin: Sweden
- Original language: Swedish
- No. of episodes: 6

Production
- Executive producers: Emma Hägglund; Iréne Lindblad; Lars Wannebo
- Producer: Anna Sofia Mörck
- Cinematography: Gustav Danielsson
- Production company: Jarowskij

Original release
- Network: Netflix
- Release: 24 November 2023

A Nearly Normal Family (Swedish: En helt vanlig familj) is a 2023 Swedish drama limited television series directed by Per Hanefjord, and developed by Hans Jörnlind and Anna Platt for Netflix. Based on the novel of the same name by M.T. Edvardsson, it stars Björn Bengtsson, Alexandra Karlsson Tyrefors, and Lo Kauppi. The six-chapter series follows the events before and after the murder of 32-year-old entrepreneur Christoffer "Chris" Olsen. It was released on 24 November 2023.

== Premise ==
Follows how a seemingly normal family's life changes when a murder proves the lengths that they are willing to go to protect each other

== Cast ==
=== Main ===
- Alexandra Karlsson Tyrefors as Stella Sandell, daughter of Ulrika and Adam Sandell.
- Christian Fandango Sundgren as Christoffer "Chris" Olsen, a 32-year-old entrepreneur, whom Stella is accused of murdering.
- Björn Bengtsson as Adam Sandell, a well-liked pastor and father of Stella Sandell, and husband of Ulrika Sandell.
- Melisa Ferhatovic as Amina Besic, an aspiring lawyer, and best friend to Stella Sandell.
- Lo Kauppi as Ulrika Sandell, a high-powered attorney and prosecutor, and mother to Stella Sandell and wife to Adam Sandell.

=== Recurring ===
- Håkan Bengtsson as Mikael Blomberg, Stella's lawyer.
- Vera Olin as Louise, Amina's acquaintance.
- Cedomir Glisovic as Nalle, a correctional officer.
- Rasmus Troedsson as John Alverland.
- Moa Gammel as Jenny Jandsdotter, a public prosecutor.
- Christoffer Willén as Robin Kjellander, a coach at the summer camp Amina and Stella attend.
- Sara Chaanhing Kennedy as Alexandra Besic, Amina's mother.
- Pablo Leiva Wenger as Dino Besic, Amina's father.
- Eva Westerlin as Kerstin Boströ, Stella's boss at Grandma's Bakery.
- Emilia Roosmann as Linda Levander, Chris's former girlfriend.

== Episodes ==
No.	Title	Directed by	Written by	Original release date
1	"Chapter One"	Per Hanefjord	Hans Jörnlind & Anna Platt	November 24, 2023
Four years after the rape of their then 15-year-old daughter Stella, the Sandells appear to be back to normal, until a murder is committed, and Stella is the prime suspect.
2	"Chapter Two"	Per Hanefjord	Hans Jörnlind & Anna Platt	November 24, 2023
While interrogations are held, the Sandells choose to keep the truth of what happened that night hidden. Adam, using his position as a pastor, pushes the case forward.
3	"Chapter Three"	Per Hanefjord	Hans Jörnlind & Anna Platt	November 24, 2023
Stella makes a shocking discovery at Chris' apartment. Ulrika uses her position as a prosecutor to get inside information.
4	"Chapter Four"	Per Hanefjord	Hans Jörnlind & Anna Platt	November 24, 2023
Ulrika sets up a dinner with the Besic's, trying to get more evidence, but she goes too far. Stella talks to her psychologist and opens up about her past trauma.
5	"Chapter Five"	Per Hanefjord	Hans Jörnlind & Anna Platt	November 24, 2023
Ulrika talks to Amina and decides to do whatever it takes to protect her family. Adam beats up Robin, but doesn't get charged for his crime, and Stella feels guilty for what happened.
6	"Chapter Six"	Per Hanefjord	Hans Jörnlind & Anna Platt	November 24, 2023
The trial finally happens. Amina takes the stand and tells the court exactly what happened that night. Stella does not get charged with murder and is released.

== Production ==
The adaptation was announced in 2022. The show was set and primarily filmed in Lund, with a few scenes filmed in Stockholm.

== Reception ==
=== Critical response ===
On the review aggregator website Rotten Tomatoes, 78% of nine critics' reviews are positive.
