= Radioskugga =

- Genre: Drama
- Created by: Charlotte Lesche & Stefan Baron
- Written by: Jonas Frykberg; Ulrika Kolmodin; Charlotte Lesche; Måns Mårlind; Pernilla Oljelund; Hans Rosenfeldt
- Directed by: Jonas Grimås; Björn Gunnarsson; Filippa Pierrou; Roger Sellberg
- Starring: see below
- Composers: Jean-Paul Wall; Kristoffer Wallman
- Country of origin: Sweden
- Original language: Swedish
- No. of seasons: 2
- No. of episodes: 16 (list of episodes)

Production
- Executive producer: Stefan Baron
- Cinematography: Björn Bondeson; Anders Bohman; Roland Lundin
- Running time: 45 min (per episode)

Original release
- Network: Sveriges television
- Release: 31 October 1995 – 10 March 1997

Radioskugga (lit. "Radio shadow") is a 1995 Swedish television series starring Figge Norling in the title role.

== Plot summary ==
Radio presenter Alexander is fired from his job at the urban Radio station. When he is offered a job at the new station Radio North Pole he moves to the small village Bakvattnet in northern Sweden only to learn that the potential audience is a mere fraction of what he is used to.

== Cast ==
- Figge Norling as Alexander
- Tomas Pontén as Johannes
- Eva-Britt Strandberg as Gun
- Gösta Bredefeldt as Oskar
- Stina Rautelin as Talvi
- Magnus Roosmann as Jonny
- Daniel Götschenhjelm as Ragnar
- Rebecka Hemse as Beata
- Gunnar Nielsen as Father Berg
- Karin Hagås as Camilla

Guest cast

- Maud Adams as Nurse Katarina (1.2, 1.5, 1.7, 2.4, 2.6, 2.8)
- Tova Magnusson-Norling as Jenny (1.1, 1.4)
- Johan Widerberg as Niklas (1.4, 1.8)
- Anna-Maria Blind as Elsa (1.3, 2.5)
- Melinda Kinnaman as Vanja (1.7, 1.8, 2.8)
- Mikael Persbrandt as Henry (1.5)
- Anna-Lena Brundin as Mimmi (1.5)
- Lena Nilsson as Ylva (1.5)
- Rino Brezina as Gerhard Brezina (1.7)
- Erik Ehn as Viktor (2.1)
- Kalle Eriksson as Alexander 8 yrs (2.1)
- Cecilia Nilsson as Solvej (2.2)
- Bernt Ström as Driver (2.2)
- Emma Norbeck as Ingrid (2.2, 2.8)
- Ann-Sofie Rase as Maria (2.3)
- Anders Nyström Big brother Jåns (2.3)
- Ulf Isenborg Little brother Jåns (2.3)
- Paula Brandt as Britta Jåns (2.3)
- Staffan Göthe as The Wanderer (2.5)
- Tomas Norström as Hans (2.6)
- Linda Källgren as Ella (2.7 and undcredited 2.8)
- Ann Petrén as Åsa Seger (2.8)
- Robin af Ekenstam as Ingemar (2.8)
- Mattias Quisth as Gustav (2,8)
- Lasse Pierrou as Malte (2.8)
