= Tom Trick =

- Years active: 1979–1983

Tom Trick was a Swedish rock group. Their active years were between 1979 and 1983. The band's line-up included Ulf Kjell Gür on vocals, Nisse Carlsson on guitar, Arne Arvidson on guitar, Badde Abrahamsson on bass, and Fredrik Reuterswärd on drums. Mikael Carlsson was on keyboard.

== Discography ==
- "Suddiga profilen / Achtung" 1980, single, CBS, produced by Steve Martin
- "Nya äventyr i tid å rum" 1980, LP
- "Reaktioner / Rosita faller" 1981, single, CBS, produced by Mikael Rickfors
- "Minilp" 1982, LP, WEA Metronome, produced by John Holm
