= Leo Hallerstam =

Swedish actor (born 1986)

Leo Hallerstam (born July 26, 1986 in Stockholm) is a Swedish actor. He has done the voices for several Swedish language dubbed versions of movies and cartoons, including the voice of Charlie Brown, and Arthur Read from the TV series of the same name. Leo Hallerstam is the son of actor Staffan Hallerstam.

He played the role of a troubled teenager in the 2004 film Miss Sweden. He played the role of an autistic boy in a 2002 episode of the Swedish TV series Beck – Pojken i glaskulan.

== Films ==
- Miss Sweden as Jens

== Dubbed Films ==
- Recess (TV series) as Mikey Blumberg
- Snoopy as Charlie Brown
- Mary Poppins as Michael Banks
- The Iron Giant as Hogarth Hughes
- Harry Potter as Fred and George Weasley
- Mi High as Tom Tupper

== TV series ==
- Beck – Pojken i glaskulan as Jack Svensson
- Total Drama Island as Duncan
- Arthur as Arthur Read
- MI High as Tom Tupper
- Toy Story as Andy
- Teenage Mutant Ninja Turtles as Raphael
- Brandman Sam as Norman Price
