= Pader =

Pader may refer to:

== People with the surname ==
- Edmund Pader (1914–1942), Austrian swimmer
- Hilaire Pader (1607–1677), French painter, poet and translator
- Lucie Pader (born 1992), French racing cyclist

== Places ==
- Pader District, a district of Uganda
- Pader, Uganda, HQ of Pader District
- Pader (river), a river in Germany

== Organizations ==
- PADER, the Party for Democracy and Reconciliation
- PaDER, Pennsylvania Department of Environmental Protection
