= AK3 =

Protein-coding gene in the species Homo sapiens

Available structures
PDB	Ortholog search: PDBe RCSB
PDB	List of PDB id codes 1ZD8

Identifiers
- Aliases: AK3, AK3L1, AK6, AKL3L, AKL3L1, FIX, adenylate kinase 3
- External IDs: OMIM: 609290; MGI: 1860835; HomoloGene: 21744; GeneCards: AK3; OMA:AK3 - orthologs

Gene location (Human)
Chr.	Chromosome 9 (human)
Band	9p24.1	Start	4,709,556 bp
Band	9p24.1	End	4,742,043 bp

Gene location (Mouse)
Chr.	Chromosome 19 (mouse)
Band	19|19 C1	Start	28,998,233 bp
Band	19|19 C1	End	29,025,361 bp
RNA expression pattern
Bgee	Human / Mouse (ortholog); Top expressed in: cardiac muscle tissue of right atrium; myocardium of left ventricle; skin of arm; deltoid muscle; tibialis anterior muscle; mucosa of ileum; jejunal mucosa; vastus lateralis muscle; biceps brachii; right ventricle / Top expressed in: epithelium of stomach; parotid gland; pyloric antrum; submandibular gland; seminal vesicula; left colon; brown adipose tissue; right kidney; retinal pigment epithelium; mucous cell of stomach; More reference expression data
BioGPS	n/a
Gene ontology
Molecular function	transferase activity; nucleotide binding; nucleobase-containing compound kinase activity; GTP binding; ATP binding; protein binding; phosphotransferase activity, phosphate group as acceptor; kinase activity; nucleoside triphosphate adenylate kinase activity; adenylate kinase activity
Cellular component	mitochondrial matrix; mitochondrion
Biological process	UTP metabolic process; blood coagulation; nucleobase-containing compound metabolic process; phosphorylation; AMP metabolic process; GTP metabolic process; ITP metabolic process; nucleoside monophosphate phosphorylation; ADP biosynthetic process
Sources:Amigo / QuickGO
Orthologs
Species	Human	Mouse
Entrez	50808	56248
Ensembl	ENSG00000147853	ENSMUSG00000024782
UniProt	Q9UIJ7	Q9WTP7
RefSeq (mRNA)	NM_016282; NM_001199852; NM_001199853; NM_001199854; NM_001199855 NM_001199856	NM_021299; NM_001365071
RefSeq (protein)	NP_001186781; NP_001186782; NP_001186784; NP_001186785; NP_057366	NP_067274; NP_001352000
Location (UCSC)	Chr 9: 4.71 – 4.74 Mb	Chr 19: 29 – 29.03 Mb
PubMed search
- Wikidata
View/Edit Human	View/Edit Mouse

Adenylate kinase 3 is a protein that in humans is encoded by the AK3 gene.

== Function ==
The protein encoded by this gene is a GTP:ATP phosphotransferase that is found in the mitochondrial matrix. Several transcript variants encoding a few different isoforms have been found for this gene.
