= Boulevardteatern =

Theatre in Stockholm, Sweden

Coordinates: 59°18′41″N 18°04′30″E

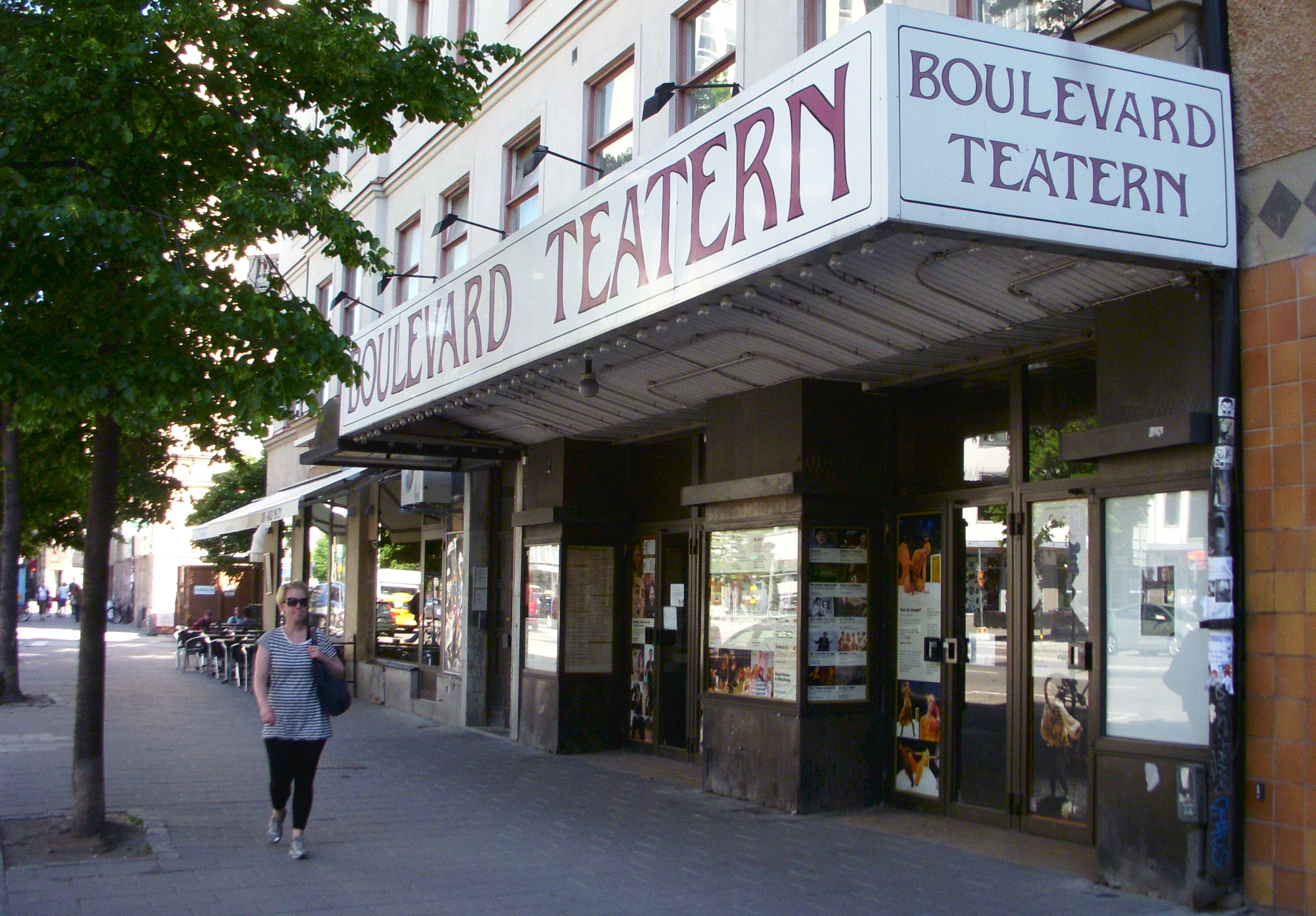
Boulevardteatern June 2010

Boulevardteatern (Boulevard Theatre) is a theatre in the district of Södermalm in Stockholm, Sweden.

== History ==
Boulevardteatern is located on Götgatan 73 in Södermalm. The theater was previously located at a site on Ringvägen 125, which was owned by the cinema Trocadero (30 September 1933– June 1934) and by Nationaltemplarorden (NTO) which subsequently bought. From 1957 until the mid of the 1960s, the theatre Nöjeskatten, founded by Arne Källerud (1913- 1981) and Carl-Gustaf Lindstedt (1921– 1992), owned the premise.

Boulevardteatern was started by Malmö based Tidningsteatern which was operated by the brothers Michael Segerström and Thomas Segerström. It opened on 10 January 1985 with the play Teaterterroristerna, directed by Michael Segerström and the plays since the opening are among Revisorn, Den girige and Onkel Vanja. In 2002 Autumn the radio program Clownen luktar bensin was broadcast from Boulevardteatern.

In 2006, Roger Westberg and Yvonne Granath took over the leadership of the theater. Since 2007, Westberg has been theater manager and artistic director at the Boulevard Theater. In 2010, Westberg started Boulevardteaterns Teaterskola, a vocational post-secondary theater school which is run in close collaboration with the theater.
