= Froggy Ball =

Book series created by Thomas Funck

Froggy Ball (Swedish: Grodan Boll) is a character from Kalle Stropp och Grodan Boll which is a series of Swedish books, radio shows and movies created by Thomas Funck. He first appeared in a radio show in 1954. The character disappeared around the early 1960s, but made a comeback in 1971 in his second radio show named "Veckans tisdag" which is Swedish for "Weekly Tuesday".

Froggy Ball appeared in comic books from 1955-1960 which were drawn by Nils Egerbrandt.

In the late 2010s, Froggy Ball became an internet meme. The character was appropriated as a symbol by the Swedish far-right in a way that is similar to how American comic character Pepe the Frog was appropriated by the alt-right movement.

== In film ==
- Kalle Stropp, Grodan Boll och deras vänner (Kalle Stropp, Grodan Boll och deras vänner) (1956)
- Kalle Stropp och Grodan Boll räddar Hönan (Kalle Stropp och Grodan Boll räddar Hönan) (1987)
- Charlie Strapp and Froggy Ball Flying High (Kalle Stropp och Grodan Boll på svindlande äventyr) (1991)

== Radio ==
- Tjong i baljan!, the 1973 episode of Sveriges Radio's Christmas Calendar; Grodan Boll and Televinken celebrate the Christmas with the help of Anita Lindman.
