= Lindman =

Lindman is a surname. Notable people with the surname include:

- Åke Lindman (1928–2009), Finnish film director and actor
- Anita Lindman (1932–2018), Swedish television announcer and producer
- Anna Lindman (born 1972), Swedish journalist and television presenter
- Antero Lindman (born 1964), Finnish racewalker
- Arvid Lindman (1862–1936), Swedish politician and Prime Minister of Sweden
- Bo Lindman (1899–1992), Swedish modern pentathlete
- Carl Axel Magnus Lindman (1856–1928), Swedish botanist and botanical artist
- Håkan Lindman (born 1961), Swedish footballer
- Hans Lindman (1884–1957), Swedish footballer
- Jörgen Lindman (born 1951), Swedish footballer
- Karl F. Lindman (1874–1952), Finnish physicist
- Martin Lindman (born 1974), Swedish ice hockey player
- Sven Lindman (1942–2025), Swedish footballer
- Victor Lindman (born 1995), Swedish ice hockey player
