= Tjong i baljan! =

- Genre: children
- Country of origin: Sweden
- Language: Swedish
- Home station: SR
- Written by: Thomas Funck, Ola Lundberg, Anita Lindman
- Produced by: Bosse Ternström
- Original release: 1973 – 1973

Tjong i baljan! is the 1973 edition of Sveriges Radio's Christmas Calendar. From this year, the Sveriges Radio's Christmas Calendar begun using its own theme and story, independent from Sveriges Television's Christmas calendar.

== Plot ==
The series follow the adventures of Grodan Boll together with Kalle Stropp, Plåt-Niklas, and the parrot Ragata. He also meets Televinken with the help of Anita Lindman.
