= Jullovsmorgon =

- Genre: children
- Country of origin: Sweden
- Original language: Swedish

Original release
- Network: SVT
- Release: 1970 – 2009

Jullovsmorgon (Christmas vacation Morning) was a TV-series for children broadcast by Sveriges Television every morning during the Swedish Christmas holidays. At the mornings during the Swedish summer holidays, a TV-series called Sommarlovsmorgon (Summer holiday Morning) is broadcast. The 1st "Jullovsmorgon" Gomorron jul with Anita och Televinken was broadcast during the 1970/1971 Christmas and the 39th and last "Jullovsmorgon" Träskändan was broadcast during the 2008/2009 Christmas.

== Series ==
- 1970/1971 – Gomorron jul with Anita och Televinken
- 1971/1972–1973/1974 – Där är du, här är jag with Beppe Wolgers
- 1974/1975 – Jul på Sverige with Jan Bergquist
- 1975/1976 – Hej jul with Eva Rydberg
- 1976/1977 – Trazan & Banarne
- 1977/1978 – Ville, Valle och Viktor
- 1978/1979 – Julkul med Staffan och Bengt with Staffan Ling and Bengt Andersson
- 1979/1980 – Clara, Valle & Sillen
- 1980/1981–1981/1982 – Jul igen hos Julofsson
- 1982/1983 – Trazan & Banarne
- 1983/1984 – TV-piraterna
- 1984/1985 – Toffelhjältarna
- 1985/1986 – Morgonstjärnan
- 1986/1987 – Toffelhjältarna går igen
- 1987/1988 – Sesam
- 1988/1989 (even 1995/1996) – Midvinterbio with Lennart R. Svensson
- 1989/1990 – Midvinterbio with Anders Forsslund
- 1990/1991–1991–1992 – Pippi Pelikan
- 1992/1993 – Jullovsmorgon
- 1993/1994 – Jullovsmorgon with Carina Molander
- 1994/1995 – Jullovsmorgon with Anita Lindman Lamm
- 1996/1997 – Jullovsmorgon with Ulf Turesson and Katti Bohman
- 1997/1998 – Jullovsmorgon with Eva Melander and Andreas Tottie
- 1998/1999 – Jullovsmorgon with Bella och Theo
- 1999/2000 – Änglar på rymmen
- 2000/2001 – Jullovsmorgon
- 2001/2002 – Det spökar i jullovsmorgon
- 2002/2003 – Expedition Kekkaluokta
- 2003/2004 – Jullovsmorgon från TV-skeppet
- 2004/2005 – Jonas jullov
- 2005/2006 – Jullovsmorgon
- 2006/2007 – Häxan Surtant
- 2007/2008 – Budfirman Bums jullov
- 2008/2009 (LAST) – Träskändan

== See also ==
- Sommarlovsmorgon
- Sveriges Radio's Christmas Calendar
- Sveriges Television's Christmas Calendar
