= Musica (company) =

Norwegian and Swedish record label

Musica was a record label created in 1945 in order to publish German Telefunken records in Sweden and Norway, since the Telefunken label could not be used after World War II. The two countries had different catalog number blocks so the same number would not appear with different record content, and there were also some blocks set aside for Denmark and Finland.

Both Norway and Sweden had local agents representing the German electronics company AEG-Telefunken before the war. Telefunken records were sold by Svensk AB Trådlös Telegrafi (SATT) in Sweden, and by Norsk Telefunken Radioaktieselskap (NTR) in Norway. After the war they were both unable to use the Telefunken label, and Telefunken were not able to produce any new records for a while. Musica was created to keep both companies going, while making new records for their local markets. In Sweden they also re-issued older, re-labeled Telefunken records.

In 1948 Telefunken was up and running again, and a new agent was started in Sweden, Telefunken Försäljnings AB (TEFAB), which took over from SATT. SATT still held the rights to the new records they had made since 1945, so TEFAB created another label, Telestar, to sell their own new recordings, both in Sweden and in Germany. In Norway, NTR had transformed into Norsk Elektronisk Radio Apparatur (NERA) in 1947. They also represented the American Capitol label, as well as Swedish labels Sonora, Karusell, Roulette and Metronome, and Danish label Tono.

TEFAB represented Capitol in Sweden from 1949, and in the beginning of 1953 they acquired Musica from SATT. At that time they also got the right to market in Sweden under the Telefunken label again, so the labels Musica and Telestar became redundant.

In Norway the Musica label continued to operate in collaboration with the national broadcasting company Norsk Rikskringkasting (NRK) providing technical support.

This all changed in 1956, when EMI and RCA Victor ceased their 55 year long cooperation, and instead EMI bought Capitol records. RCA now wanted separate representation in European countries. In Norway NERA started issuing their recordings on the RCA label, while in Sweden a new company was set up to market RCA, Grammofon AB Electra. Electra was run by the same people that owned TEFAB, and the two companies were merged in 1962.

In the early 1970’s Musica was used as a budget label for compilation and re-issues, and for children’s records, in Norway, Sweden and Finland. NERA’s record division was spun off into the company AS Disco in 1972, which was taken over by Electra’s daughter company in Norway 1983. The mother company Electra was liquidated in 1990, and its assets were split between the new owners. In Norway Electra continued under the same name with new owners, issuing mostly children’s records on Musica for another decade or so.

Some Swedish artists: Stikkan Andersson, Sven Lindberg, Stig Olin, Grodan Boll (Thomas Funck), Vi på Saltkråkan, Jan Lindblad, Bengt-Arne Wallin.

Some Norwegian artists: Jens Book-Jenssen, Nora Brockstedt, Kurt Foss and Reidar Bøe, Egil Monn-Iversen, Arne Bendiksen, Thorbjørn Egner.

== Sources ==
Björn Englund: Telefunken. Nationalfonotekets diskografier 17. 1975

Björn Englund & Lars-Göran Frisk: Musica. Nationalfonotekets diskografier 18. 1976

Tom Valle & Arild Bratteland: Musica. Norske diskografier 5. 1991. ISBN 82-90831-11-0

Björn Englund & Mats Elfström: Ultraphon/Telefunken/Pallas. Svenska diskografier 9. Arkivet för ljud och bild. 1994. ISSN 0348-8624

Hans-Ove Regén: electragrammofon.se. 2016 (retrieved August 20, 2022)

Tomas Bårdsen: Sporfinnere (diss.) University of Agder. 2019. ISBN 978-82-7117-943-4

Discogs (retrieved August 20, 2022)
