= Philip Øgaard =

Norwegian cinematographer (born 1948)

Philip Remi Øgaard
- Born: 6 April 1948 (age 78); Norway
- Occupation: Cinematographer

Philip Remi Øgaard (born 6 April 1948) is a Norwegian cinematographer. Since 1983, Øgaard has photographed more than 30 feature films, and has come to be recognized as one of Norway's premier cinematographers. He frequently collaborates with directors Martin Asphaug, Bent Hamer and Hans Petter Moland.

Øgaard has been commended for his tasteful and naturalistic lighting, and ability to effectively compose difficult shots, often utilising subtle but very precise movement.

== Selected filmography ==
- 1988: Hotel St. Pauli
- 1988: Sweetwater
- 1989: En håndfull tid (A Handful of Time)
- 1990: Døden på Oslo S (Death at Oslo Central)
- 1992: Giftige løgner (Lethal Lies)
- 1993: Telegrafisten (The Telegraphist)
- 1994: Ti kniver i hjertet (Cross My Heart and Hope to Die)
- 1995: Kjærlighetens kjøtere (Zero Kelvin)
- 1998: En dag til i solen (Water Easy Reach)
- 1998: Glassblåserens barn (The Glass-blower's Children)
- 1999: Fomlesen i kattepine (Fumblebody in a Cat's Jam)
- 2000: Aberdeen
- 2002: Grabben i graven bredvid (The Guy in the Grave Next Door)
- 2003: Salmer fra kjøkkenet (Kitchen Stories)
- 2003: Lille frk Norge (The Beast of Beauty)
- 2004: Andreaskorset (The Crossing)
- 2004: Min misunnelige frisør (My Jealous Barber)
- 2005: Kim Novak badade aldrig i Genesarets sjö (Kim Novak Never Swam in the Lake of Genesaret)
- 2006: Gymnaslærer Pedersen (Pedersen: High-School Teacher)
- 2019: Cold Pursuit
- 2024: Absolution

== Awards ==
- 1988: The Film Critics' Award from Norsk Filmkritikerlag (Norwegian Critics' Guild), for Hotel St. Pauli and Sweetwater
- 1990: The Aamot-statuet, FILM&KINO honorary award
- 1999: Guldbagge from Svensk filminstitutt (Swedish Film Institute) Guldbagge Awards, for The Glass-blower's Children
- 2000: Bronze Frog at the Camerimage festival, Poland, for Aberdeen
- 2003: Award for Best Cinematography at the Valladolid International Film Festival, for Kitchen Stories
