= Jörgen Lantz =

Swedish actor (born 1943)

Lars Lantz
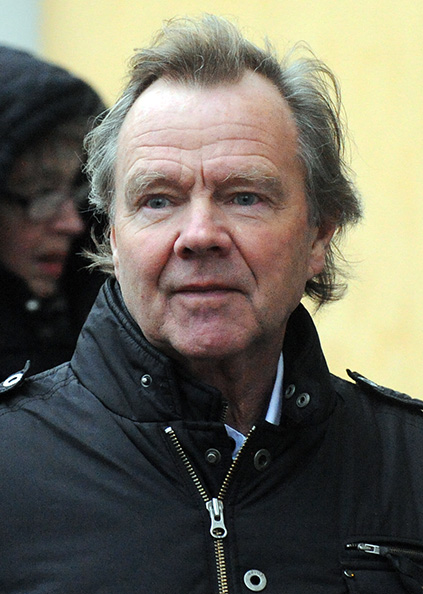
- Lantz at Kim Anderzon's funeral, 24 November 2014
- Born: 23 December 1943 (age 82); Stockholm, Sweden
- Occupation: actor

Lars Jörgen Lantz (born 23 December 1943) is a Swedish actor, known for his appearances in children's TV program, among them Ville, Valle och Viktor (as Ville) and Björnes magasin (1987–2001, as Björne). Lars Jörgen Lantz voiced Piglet in The New Adventures of Winnie the Pooh Swedish dub Media Dubb version.

== Selected filmography ==
- 1965 - Flygplan saknas
- 1967 - Hagbard and Signe
- 1970 & 1972 - Ville, Valle och Viktor (TV) (also screenwriter)
- 1974 - Huset Silfvercronas gåta (TV)
- 1991 - Charlie Strap and Froggy Ball Flying High
- 1999 - En liten julsaga
