= Randsfjord Træmasse og Papirfabrik =

Norwegian pulp and paper company

- Formerly: Randsfjord Træsliberi
- Company type: Aksjeselskap
- Industry: Pulp and paper
- Founded: 1883
- Defunct: 1932
- Headquarters: Bergerfossen, Jevnaker, Oppland, Norway
- Products: Wood pulp, paper

Randsfjord Træmasse og Papirfabrik was an industrial company that produced wood pulp and paper at Bergerfossen in Jevnaker. The company was established in 1883 as a wood-grinding mill, and a paper factory was added in 1890. Paper production ended in 1930 and the mill in 1932.

== History ==
Randsfjord Træmasse og Papirfabrik was built in 1883 at Bergerfoss, which forms the outlet of Randsfjorden. As with many other wood-processing companies, it began as a wood-grinding mill, on the initiative of the engineer Rikard Lied, under the name A/S Randsfjord Træsliberi. The plant had an annual production of 1,800 tonnes of 50 percent wet wood pulp across two grinding machines.

In its first years of pulp production the company needed a workforce of 15, who produced 1,800 tonnes in the start-up year of 1883. Expansion soon followed: a new grinding machine was installed in 1886, raising production to 5,000 tonnes, though the figure given for 1887 is 2,950 tonnes. The driving power was 600 hp in 1888.

Only four years after the new grinding machine arrived, work began on a paper factory. Gustav Hartmann and Christian L. Røgeberg led its technical construction; both had been central figures at Holmen Papirfabrik in Drammen, and chastened by that experience, they chose a quite different system from the one used at the Drammen factory. In 1890 production of brown paper and silk paper began on machines bought from Füllner in Germany, and this time the choice of machinery proved more successful than what Hartmann and Røgeberg had known at Holmen. The brown-paper production at Randsfjord was based on the company's own wood pulp, and with this early start the company at Bergerfossen was the first in the area to produce paper from wood fiber. In keeping with the expansion into paper, the company was renamed A/S Randsfjord Træmasse og Papirfabrik.

== Workers and industrial community ==
It was only with the establishment of the paper factory that the industrial community at the outlet of Randsfjorden really began to grow. By 1910 there were 210 employees at Randsfjord Træmasse og Papirfabrik. Most of the workers lived either on the east side of Bergerfossen, Moløkka, or on the west side of the waterfall, and the place is also known as Mo-Bergerfossen. Because of the need for more workers, construction of factory housing on the east side of the waterfall was begun alongside the paper factory in 1890. Two buildings with 12 apartments each were put up, each apartment with two rooms; overcrowding was pronounced, with families of up to ten people.

A trade union was established in time. From 1906 workers could organize in the Randsfjord Paper and Pulp Workers' Union and so press for better conditions. The union was dissolved in 1945.

== Production ==
The factory was ravaged by fire twice, first in 1901, after which it was rebuilt. Production then began of glazed brown wood paper on two Fourdrinier machines of 280 cm and 210 cm width, with six hollanders and six steam boilers. When paper is glazed, it is pressed against heated rollers to give a smoother surface, and the brown glazed paper was used mainly as wrapping paper. Output was 8,000 tonnes a year. This paper grade was gradually replaced by others, so production at Randsfjord was converted to printing paper in 1915, while pulp production took place on six grinding machines.

Improvements to the plant continued. By 1920 the number of grinding machines had been reduced to four, and pulp production had reached 12,000 tonnes a year. Paper was still made on the same machines installed in 1901, and output held at 8,000 tonnes, the same amount as 19 years earlier. Only toward the end of the decade did paper production rise, reaching 11,000 tonnes in 1929, which required about 180 employees. Higher output did not automatically mean more workers; the company had 224 on its payroll in 1910.

The company thus underwent gradual improvements in the 1920s that benefited production volume and brought considerable efficiency gains, but the upturn did not last. In 1930 the factory burned again, and after this last fire it was never rebuilt. The fire did not spread to the mill, where production was kept alive until the winter of 1931–1932, when it too ended. Wood pulp and paper were never again produced at A/S Randsfjord Træmasse og Papirfabrik. In the year the factory burned, it had been producing 36 tonnes of paper a day.

== Bibliography ==
- Bull, Edvard, ed. (1953). Arbeidsfolk forteller fra papirindustrien. Oslo.
- Ek, Bent (1998). Fabrikken ved Hellefossen. Borregaard Hellefos 1898–1998. Hokksund, p. 73.
- Hadeland Bygdenes historie, vol. 2, 1932.
- Johannesen, A. (1889). En historisk fremstilling ledsaget med statiske og grafiske karter af de norske træsliberier til udgangen af aaret 1887.
- Kaldal, Ingar (1989). Papirarbeidernes historie. Norsk Papirindustriarbeiderforbund 1913–1988. Oslo.
- Smith, Øyvind (1998). «Fålum» og distriktets treforedling.
- Aarflot, Reidar (1985). «Industrisamfunnet som forsvant – Glimt fra Randsfjord Træmasse- og Papirfabrikk», in Årbok for Hadeland 1985. Jaren.
