= List of Skärgårdsdoktorn episodes =

This is a list of episodes for the SVT television series Skärgårdsdoktorn.

#	Title	Air Date	Director	Writer
Season 1
1	"En värld i tusen bitar"	13 October 1997	Martin Asphaug	Lars Bill Lundholm, Gunilla Linn Persson
Johan Steen and his daughter Wilma moves to Saltö in Sweden after ten years in Africa.
2	"Den barmhärtige samariten"	20 October 1997	Martin Asphaug	Lars Bill Lundholm, Gunilla Linn Persson
3	"Den ljusaste dagen..."	27 October 1997	Martin Asphaug	Lars Bill Lundholm, Gunilla Linn Persson
4	"Nya och gamla själar"	3 November 1997	Martin Asphaug	Lars Bill Lundholm, Gunilla Linn Persson
5	"I kräftans tid"	10 November 1997	Martin Asphaug	Lars Bill Lundholm, Gunilla Linn Persson
6	"Höst i våra hjärtan"	17 November 1997	Daniel Lind Lagerlöf	Lars Bill Lundholm, Gunilla Linn Persson
Season 2
7	"Stadsfolk och öbor"	16 March 1998	Martin Asphaug	Lars Bill Lundholm, Gunilla Linn Persson
8	"Sensommargäster"	23 March 1998	Martin Asphaug	Lars Bill Lundholm, Gunilla Linn Persson
9	"Fäder"	30 March 1998	Martin Asphaug	Lars Bill Lundholm, Gunilla Linn Persson
10	"I nöd och lust"	6 April 1998	Daniel Lind Lagerlöf	Lars Bill Lundholm, Gunilla Linn Persson
11	"Den blomstertid nu kommer"	13 April 1998	Daniel Lind Lagerlöf	Lars Bill Lundholm, Gunilla Linn Persson
12	"Hemkomsten"	20 April 1998	Daniel Lind Lagerlöf	Lars Bill Lundholm, Gunilla Linn Persson
Season 3
13	"Sommarnattens ljus"	3 April 2000	Kristian Petri	Lars Bill Lundholm, Gunilla Linn Persson
14	"Havsörnsvals"	10 April 2000	Kristian Petri	Lars Bill Lundholm, Gunilla Linn Persson
15	"Gubbar och sjöjungfrur"	17 April 2000	Kristian Petri	Lars Bill Lundholm, Gunilla Linn Persson
16	"Se till mig som liten är"	24 April 2000	Rickard Petrelius	Lars Bill Lundholm, Gunilla Linn Persson
17	"Nomaderna"	1 May 2000	Rickard Petrelius	Lars Bill Lundholm, Gunilla Linn Persson
18	"Vinterlekar"	8 May 2000	Rickard Petrelius	Lars Bill Lundholm, Gunilla Linn Persson
