= Stig Grybe =

Swedish actor, comedian and director (1928–2017)

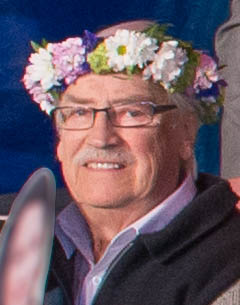
- Grybe in June 2015
- Born: Stig Rudolf Grybe; 18 July 1928; Stockholm, Sweden
- Died: 1 February 2017 (aged 88); Gävle Municipality, Sweden
- Occupation: Actor
- Years active: 1947–2011

Stig Rudolf Grybe (18 July 1928 – 1 February 2017) was a Swedish actor, comedian, writer and film director.

== Biography ==
Grybe's debut as a film actor was in the 1947 film Får jag lov, magistern, starring Stig Järrel and Ulla Sallert. In the late 1950s and early 1960s, Grybe played the character "Ante Nordlund" on the radio, in a 1963 TV series, and in the 1964 movie Drömpojken. He also worked in some of the Knäppupp revues. He voiced the villain, Dr. Drunkelspiel in The Dog Hotel (2000).

Grybe worked on primarily on stage, in TV series and films.

Grybe died following a short illness on 1 February 2017 at the age of 88.

== Selected filmography ==
=== Dubbing ===
- One Hundred and One Dalmatians (1961)
- The Jungle Book (1967)
- Pete's Dragon (1977)
- The Smurfs (1981)
- Snow White and the Seven Dwarfs (1982)
- DuckTales (1987)
- Homeward Bound: The Incredible Journey (1993)
- A Goofy Movie (1995)
- Homeward Bound II: Lost in San Francisco (1996)
- A Bug's Life (1998)

=== Swedish productions ===
- Kalle Stropp, Grodan Boll och deras vänner (1956)
- Dunderklumpen! (1974)
- Maria (1975)
- Charlie Strapp and Froggy Ball Flying High (1991)
- The Dog Hotel (2000)
