= Fomlesen i kattepine =

- Directed by: Petter A. Fastvold
- Written by: Lars Vik; Arthur Johansen
- Produced by: Aage Aaberge
- Starring: Lars Vik
- Cinematography: Philip Øgaard
- Edited by: Pål Gengenbach
- Music by: Geir Bøhren; Bent Åserud
- Release date: December 26, 1999
- Running time: 83 minutes
- Country: Norway
- Language: Norwegian

Fomlesen i kattepine (Fumblebody in a Cat's Jam or Fumblebody in a Cat-Astrophic Jam) is a Norwegian film from 1999 directed by Petter A. Fastvold. The screenplay was written by Lars Vik and Arthur Johansen.

== Plot ==
The well-intentioned and warm-hearted but clumsy ex-lawyer Fritjof Fomlesen (Lars Vik) miraculously saves a shipwrecked cat. In the cat's collar is hidden a picture of a beautiful girl and a note: Help! Unsuspecting, Fomlesen stumbles into Dobberby and comes into conflict with the genius inventor Rex Dobbermann (Sverre Anker Ousdal), who doggedly pursues wealth and power. Fomlesen's surprise arrival gives Dobbermann, as well as his right and left hands Britt Bull (Mia Gundersen) and Sam Bernhard (Jonas Rønning), double work and headaches. Against his will, Fomlesen becomes entangled in Dobbermann's insidious plans, and in the end he is the only one that can avert an imminent disaster in the idyllic town.

== Cast ==
- Lars Vik as Fritjof Fomlesen
- Sverre Anker Ousdal as Rex Dobbermann
- Henriette Steenstrup as Tess
- Mia Gundersen as Britt Bull
- Jonas Rønning as Sam Bernhard
- Sidsel Ryen as Aunt Dobberdame
- Mikkel Gaup as Alf A. Romeo
- Martin Faltýn as Lund
- Martin Hruška as Petter River
- Tor Erik Gunstrøm as the cook
- Robert Skjærstad as the butler
