= Drammens Glassverk =

Norwegian glassworks

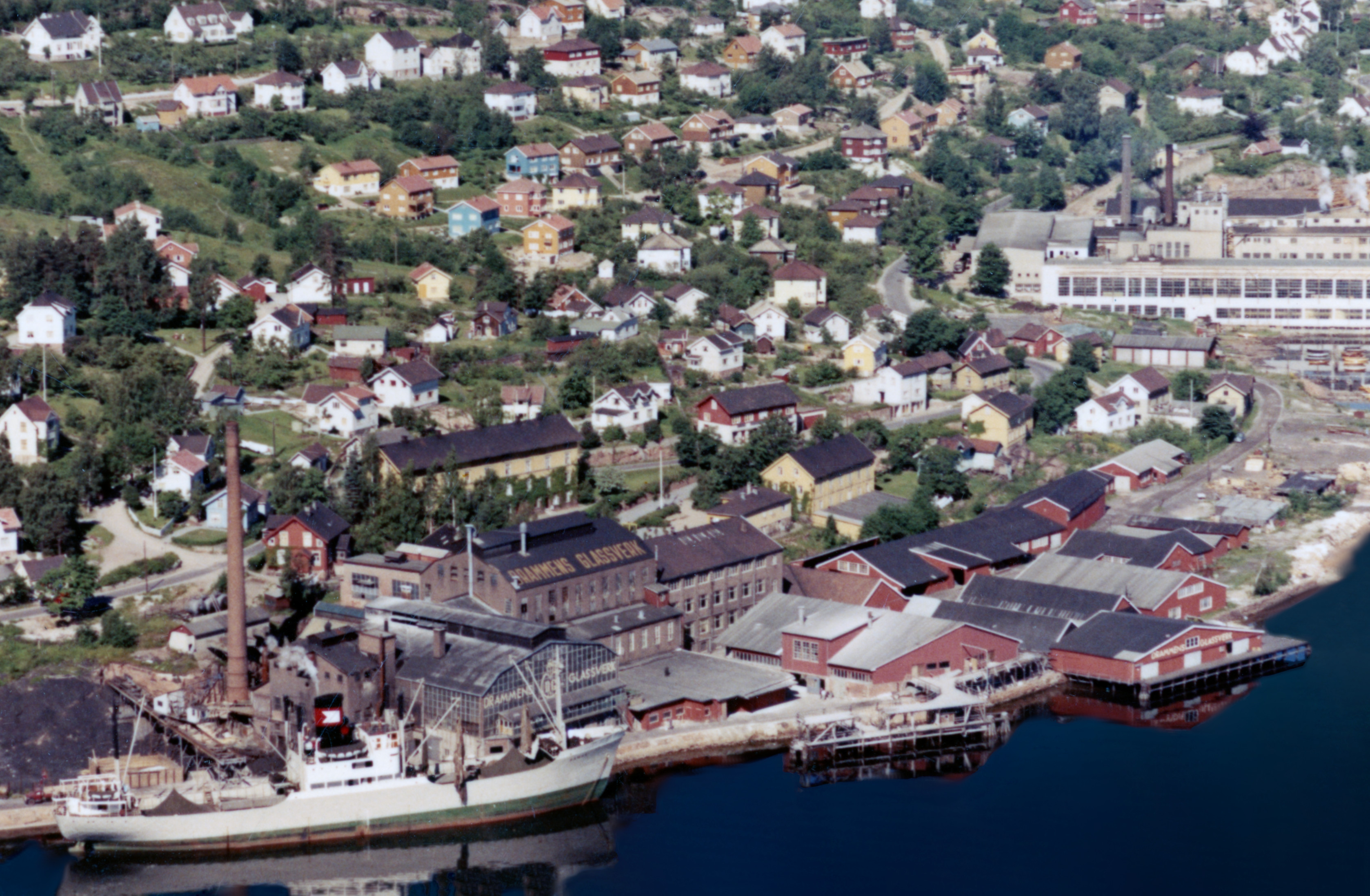
- Formerly: Tangens Glasværk; Drammens Glasværk
- Company type: Aksjeselskap
- Industry: Glass
- Founded: 1872
- Defunct: 1989 (melting ceased 1977)
- Fate: Outcompeted by float glass production
- Headquarters: Tangen, Drammen, Norway
- Products: Window glass, bottles, household glass, insulating glass
- Owner: Christiania Glasmagasin; Saint-Gobain

Drammens Glassverk (Norwegian for "Drammen Glassworks") was a glass producer at Tangen in Drammen. The works operated from 1873 to 1989 and developed from purely handcrafted production of bottles and small glassware into the only glassworks in Norway to have produced window glass by machine.

Window glass from Drammen held a very high market share at home, and the works was also one of the producers of the well-known household jar Norgesglass. French owners came in during the 1960s, but the works was outcompeted in the late 1970s.

== History ==
=== The start ===
On a point called Skanseodden in the Drammensfjord, the Drammen men Frantz Tandberg, Chr. Wriedt, Tom Lorentzen, and Fr. Melhuus built a bottle works in 1872–1873, called Tangens Glasværk, on the land of the Nordby farm. Operation began in 1873. Until 1878 there was no road access, so the business depended on a good quay. The works was originally a pure bottle works, intended for making bottles for the town's breweries as well as distilleries and pharmacy glass, and the glasshouse was built with an eight-pot coal-fired melting furnace.

The works had 21 permanent workers as well as some day laborers and glasshouse boys. It produced bottles of well-known types, made in the Norwegian tradition from raw material that gave a strongly green-colored glass, but brown bottles had also come on the market, which people liked better. A boathouse was converted into what later became the workers' housing "Norge," while another dwelling, "Svenskebrakka," was built at the same time.

The bottle-makers were mostly Swedes, with some Danes among them, while the helper boys were local. A shift began when a melt was ready, but the melting time was variable and uncertain, so the melt might be ready to work in the middle of the night, and a new shift could begin at any hour. Transport of goods to and from the works was awkward, all of it going across the fjord, with finished goods carried mainly in winter by horse and sleigh over the fjord ice. There were no storage buildings for bottles, so they were stored outside, where rain, snow, and frost led to much breakage and many cracked from freezing. Awkward operation, green bottles, large losses, and strong competition from many bottle works in the Nordic countries led to operation being halted at Christmas 1875, as it was no longer profitable.

=== Drammens Glasværk ===
In 1877–1878 production was converted to white glass, small glassware, household glass, and lighting glass. The rebuilding was finished in 1878 and operation began under the name Drammens Glasværk, with the works patron Kjellman of Bromö as daily manager and his son-in-law Ole Kraft of Hadeland as glasshouse master. The small-glass makers were mostly Swedes, while some came from Hadeland, and a steam-driven glass-grinding shop was built. The works produced tableware glass, wine glasses, carafes, lighting glass, perfume and ink bottles, oil containers, lamp shades, and more.

The works' glass was known for being attractive and solid. Carafes were made in various animal shapes, and glassware was produced in blue, red, green, clear, brown, and bone-white. Sometimes the glassblowers made walking sticks with inlaid ruby threads as souvenirs.

=== Turn to window glass ===
In 1882 the works was taken over by the bank manager H. I. Jacobsen of Kristiania. Around midsummer, Jacobsen's brother-in-law, the experienced glasshouse master Nils H. Hetty (1820–1905), and his son Petter Hetty (1845–1896) came to convert production to window glass, the latter as glasshouse master. On 23 June 1882 the works began a period that over the coming hundred years would make Drammens Glasværk the country's leading window-glass producer. The eight-pot furnace from the small-glass period was used for the first two years but was replaced in August 1884 by a tank furnace, the first such installation in Norway.

Work could run in two 12-hour shifts, working at the furnace while glass was melted in the tank at the same time. After a short while the tank sprang a leak, the molten glass ran out and set fire to the glasshouse, which burned down, and a new glasshouse and tank were built. Window-glass production was pure handwork: the glassblower blew up a large, long sausage of glass, the ends were cut off, and the resulting cylinder was slit lengthwise and folded out into a rectangular pane of a standard 114 × 171 cm. A glassblower could make 40 to 50 panes per shift, depending on the thickness. The works had about 25 employees when Jacobsen went bankrupt in 1886, and it closed again.

=== Christiania Glasmagasin takes over ===
The closed Drammens Glasværk was taken over by the skipper Dahl in 1886 but remained idle until P. C. Bjercke took over and resumed operation in February 1887. Conditions were not good; it was said that Bjercke used most of his capital to build tenement blocks in Kristiania instead of paying the workers. There was a one-day strike at the works, and the tank was filled with salt water. In 1891 Bjercke gave up, and operation was again halted.

In 1893 Christiania Glasmagasin bought Drammens Glassverk for 80,000 kroner. By this time Christiania Glasmagasin was almost a monopolist in the Norwegian glass market, controlling most of the large glassworks in Norway, such as Høvik Glassverk, Hadeland Glassverk, Hurdal Glassverk, and Biri Glassverk. The Drammen works was bought to replace the old and unmodern Hurdal Glassverk, which was closed a little later, having failed to manage the change from wood to coal as fuel, and Hurdal's glassblowers and melters were largely transferred to Drammen. Hans Langbach, hired as operations manager, rebuilt and modernized the works for window-glass production.

After the rebuilding, the works got going again in 1895 and employed 135 workers, once the window-glass production from Hurdal, closed just before Christmas 1895, had also been transferred to Drammen. In 1899 operation was expanded from 18 to 27 workshops, and the workforce grew from 80 to 110. A new tank was built and the works enlarged; production was then about 30,000 cases of 10 square meters of glass a year, rising after rebuilding in 1900 to about 40,000 cases. The growth in the workforce led to two new workers' housing buildings, "Skandinavien" and "Finnland." In 1901 production was 41,833 cases of window glass, impressive given the many shutdowns and fires as well as the strong foreign competition that was already lower in price.

=== Løve and Norges jars ===
In 1908 production was expanded with preserving jars and canning jars, the well-known "Løveglass" and "Norgesglass," which were produced until 1957; as early as 1909, 112,635 preserving jars were made. In 1912 the company was again expanded by rebuilding, raising production to about 50,000 cases of window glass a year. In 1916 the works bought the Nordby and Åskollen farms and built manager and workers' housing on them. In the 1920s window-glass production underwent a total change from the handcraft method to machine production at the works, which had about 150 employees in 1914 and 232 in 1921.

=== Industrial response to competition ===
In 1918 window-glass production was expanded from 27 to 36 workshops. In January 1921 the works had a longer shutdown owing to strong competition from Belgium and high coal prices, and did not get going again until October 1921, with 221 workers and 11 salaried staff. In 1925–1926 a new and larger tank was built.

In the United States and Belgium, machines had been developed for the continuous drawing of window glass, so it was decided to rebuild the works for the machine age in order not to be left behind. In 1928 the works was completely rebuilt for purely mechanical operation by the Belgian Fourcault's method, in which the glass was drawn directly up from the molten mass through a cooling shaft by a float arrangement, emerging continuously as a roughly 130-cm-wide ribbon at the top, where it was cut to suitable lengths at a thickness of between 1 and 7 mm. Four Fourcault machines were installed for window glass and special glass, and from 1 October 1928 production by the cylinder method ceased.

The glassblowers became industrial workers. After a building time of only five months, the tempering of the new tank could begin, and the result was very good: lost market share was won back, sales rose 100 percent in the first five years, and the import of window glass was reduced toward the Second World War to 20 percent of the country's needs. The machines ran continuously, around the clock, all year, for the melting furnace, which held 450 tonnes of molten glass mass, had to have a steady outflow to the machines at all times so they would not be ruined; a shift system was therefore introduced giving workers 24 hours off between 8-hour shifts. In addition to ordinary window glass, production was expanded to thin frame glass and thick special glass, the capacity after rebuilding being about 100,000 cases a year, more than the whole country's needs.

=== Director Tanberg ===
In 1930 the engineer Ulf Styren left as manager after leading the works since 1914 and moved to Sweden; in his time, besides full industrialization, much had also been invested in housing to secure a stable workforce. The engineer and works owner Ragnar Tanberg (1899–1982) took over the leadership. Of the Tanberg works-owning family at Hurdal Verk, and grandson of the Ragnar Tandberg who had helped start the works in 1872, he had trained as an electrical engineer at the Norwegian Institute of Technology in 1923 and worked seven years in the United States. With this background, both professional and familial, he was a trusted man in the owning group Christiania Glasmagasin, and he remained the works' manager until 1964.

A glass-grinding shop and mirror-silvering shop were set up, and the works also had its own sawmill, planing mill, and case factory, which supplied all kinds of cases for its own needs and special cases to order, using 4,000 dozen planks a year and making 300 to 400 cases a day. In 1932 a plant was built for casting wired and ornamental glass with its own melting furnace, and from 1933 to 1947 wired glass was produced, except during the Second World War. Because of the increased demand for window glass, however, wired-glass production was closed, and an electric melting furnace with a glass-drawing machine was built to add to the machines on the gas-fired furnace.

=== Important industry under the occupation ===
After the occupation of 9 April 1940, a new situation arose. The authorities declared the business vital and required it to keep production going, extensive building and securing works were carried out, and a guard force of 40 men was set up. But the supply of fuel and raw material became a problem, as almost everything had previously been imported. Improvisation was possible: Belgian sand was replaced with Norwegian quartz and new deposits of dolomite were found in Norway, but coal eventually became scarce, so operation stopped in 1942 until the works acquired a briquetting plant based on coal dust and sulfite liquor, after which it resumed eight months later.

Production was higher than in the last years before the war, and demand for preserving jars was three times greater than before, for now everyone was to preserve food. All employees had a quota of 12 jars, and the works also saw to it that the workers got something to put in them: anyone who wished was allotted a plot at the Nordby or Solum farm, and in time the supply service also came to include the purchase of vegetables, herring, fish, and cod-liver oil.

=== From gas and coal to electric melting ===
After the war the works gradually began to use electricity for melting glass, and a number of small experimental furnaces were built. After a tank with one drawing machine had run for some years with good results, in 1958 the full step to electrification was taken. Some successful years followed, with considerable rationalization and automation; new machines were developed, patented, and sold to several countries, and automatic cutting machines were introduced. Around 1950 the works, with a footprint of 6,000 square meters, had 475 employees.

=== Norges jars from Drammen to Moss ===
In 1957 about 2 million square meters of window glass and special glass and 2 million preserving jars were produced annually. Production of preserving jars (Norgesglass) was that year transferred to Moss Glassverk, which had already received a license in 1949 to produce the Norges jars to meet demand. Preserving-jar production was scaled down in Drammen because the increasing window-glass production placed too great a load on the glass furnace, and by the time all production was gathered in Moss, the Drammen works had produced about 32 million preserving jars in all.

=== Largest insulating-glass producer ===
What now remained was the production of single panes, but in the 1950s heat insulation in house walls had come strongly into building practice, and the need for better-insulated windows pressed forward. As a good and practical solution, insulating glass was developed and put into production from 1959. Drammens Glassverk was early to this and quickly became the country's largest insulating-glass supplier for many years. Production of toughened glass also began in these years and developed into a significant product. The works followed social developments closely and was quick to make glass for new needs, such as glass that prevented excessive solar heating of rooms in summer, glass that reduced noise, glass that gave better security against burglary and vandalism, and glass for the rise of "glassism" in the building industry, with all-glass facades in colored glass.

=== Workers' housing and community life ===
Director Tanberg became well known and well liked among his employees partly because he took an interest in social conditions beyond the workplace as well. In the old company-town manner, Drammen Glassverk became almost a community of its own, with working life and leisure organized around the factory. Nearly all the workers lived at the works in their own homes or in the works' housing, and the works had 112 apartments for its employees. In 1946 part of the Nordby field was divided into building plots, and 28 detached houses were built, financed by the glassworks and later sold to the workers. The works had its own assembly hall (Varden) with cinema showings, a library with a reading room, a choral society, a youth club, a brass band, a boys' band, chess and bridge clubs, a kindergarten for children between 4 and 7, a women's health association, and more.

=== Joint-stock company and a technical revolution ===
On 1 January 1966 Drammens Glassverk was spun off as its own joint-stock company, in which A/S Christiania Glasmagasin owned 70 percent and the French glass group Saint-Gobain 30 percent; Saint-Gobain later took over all the shares. The cooperation gave access to the latest advances in glass technology, and 1968 became a new landmark year as a wholly new drawing process, the Pittsburgh process, was introduced, giving both better quality and greater quantity. The works then had 380 employees and presented itself as a thoroughly modern window-glassworks.

In the late 1960s, however, the large English glass group Pilkington developed the float process, a new and revolutionary glass-drawing process that within a few years became almost dominant for producing building glass. It proved impossible to compete with a float works, and after Pilkington decided to build a float-glassworks in Scandinavia, the giant works at Halmstad, time was up for the old glassworks: Emmaboda in Sweden, Korsør in Denmark, and Drammens Glassverk in Norway.

=== Closure ===
In 1977 window-glass production in Drammen was closed, marking the end of a long industrial tradition in Norway. The company then concentrated on glass finishing and the production of insulating glass under the name Drammen Glass A/S, with branches in Stange, Otta, Hamar, and Stavanger, the last two closed in 1986. The Drammen Glass group was dominant in the Norwegian market with a share of around 25 percent, but its finances were difficult. In 1988 the group's French owner, Saint-Gobain, also bought the insulating-glass producer Scandi Glass in Sem, which had for years been Drammens Glassverk's most important competitor, and the following year the Scandi-Glass group was formed. Drammens Glassverk was renamed Scandi Glass Drammen, but production was closed the same year, by which time there were as many as 33 insulating-glass producers spread across the country.

=== The site after closure ===
The factory area was sold to Folke A. Axelson A/S and leased to about 20 different businesses in the Glassverket Industrisenter. New owners launched plans in 2000 for up to 1,000 homes at the waterfront, which came to nothing. Union Eiendom took over the area in 2006, with about 20 commercial tenants, and in 2021 revived the housing plans, moderated to about 550 homes designed by the architectural firm Lund & Slaatto under the name Glassverket.

== Bibliography ==
- Borgen, Per Otto; Heieren, Reidar (2011). Made in Drammen. Drammen Rotary.
