= Bindman =

Bindman is a surname. Notable people with the surname include:

- Geoffrey Bindman (1933-2025), British solicitor specialising in human rights
- David Bindman (1940-2025), English professor of the history of art, University College London

== See also ==
- Lindman
