= Sverre Anker Ousdal =

Norwegian actor (1944–2026)

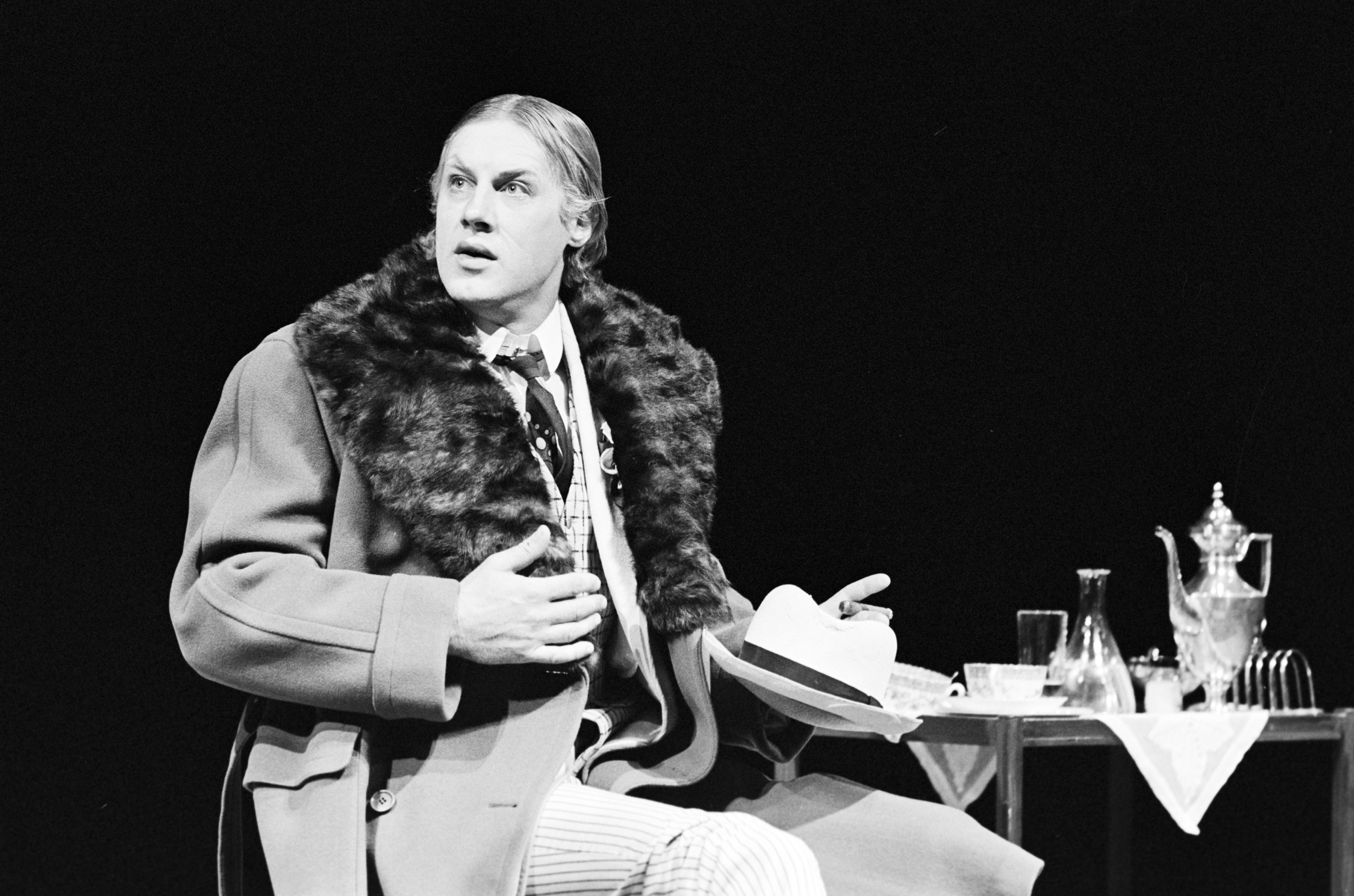
- Ousdal in 1977
- Born: 18 July 1944; Flekkefjord, Norway
- Died: 3 January 2026 (aged 81); Oslo, Norway
- Occupation: Actor

Sverre Anker Ousdal (18 July 1944 – 3 January 2026) was a Norwegian actor. He was the father of actor Mads Ousdal.

== Life and career ==
Ousdal was born in Flekkefjord, Norway on 18 July 1944, and was of tall stature at 6’5" (195 cm)

He made his debut in 1965 at Den Nationale Scene in Bergen. He worked at the Oslo Nye Teater between 1967 and 1970, and from 1970 was part of Norway's Nationaltheatret ensemble.

He had major roles in several television series like Grenseland (1980), Blodsbånd (1998, for which he was awarded an Amanda), Familjen (Swedish) and Deadline Torp (2005). He also received the Amanda Award in 1990 for his part in the Norwegian Broadcasting Corporation play Kreditorer. In 1997 he was made a Knight First Class of the Royal Norwegian Order of St Olav for his acting work.

Ousdal had a number of major roles in Norwegian and Swedish films, including Karjolsteinen (1977), Orion's Belt (1985), Falsk som vatten (1985), Etter Rubicon (1987), and Insomnia. He also appeared in US films like The Island at the Top of the World (1974) and in several British productions, most notably the serial The Last Place on Earth (1985), where he starred as polar explorer Roald Amundsen.

Ousdal was diagnosed with cancer in 2008, and lost most of his eyesight due to a mistake made by surgeons during an operation to remove a tumour. He retired as an actor in November 2013, after playing the title role in a production of King Lear at the National Theatre in Oslo.

He planned a comeback on Nationaltheatret later in 2026, in the role as an aging father, together with his son Mads. Ousdal died in Oslo on 3 January 2026, at the age of 81.

== Selected filmography ==
- The Greatest Gamble (1967)
- Olsen-banden (1968)
- Kanarifuglen (1973)
- Den siste Fleksnes (1974)
- Min Marion (1975)
- Wives (1975)
- Pøbel (1978)
- Grenseland (1980)
- Martin (1981)
- Flight of the Eagle (1982)
- Hockeyfeber (1983)
- Last Gleaming (1983)
- The Chieftain (1984)
- False as Water (1985)
- Orion's Belt (1985)
- Plastposen (1986)
- A Film About Love (1987)
- Etter Rubicon (1987)
- Over grensen (1987)
- Mio in the Land of Faraway (1987)
- Folk og røvere i Kardemomme by (1988)
- Sweetwater (1988)
- The Dive (1990)
- The Last Dance (1993)
- Kristin Lavransdatter (1995)
- Hamsun (1996)
- Insomnia (1997)
- Eva's Eye (1999)
- Fomlesen i kattepine (1999)
- The 7 Deadly Sins (2000)
- Familjen (2002)
- Everyone Loves Alice (2002)
- Kitchen Stories (2003)
- The Crossing (2004)
- Deadline Torp (2005)
- The Secret Life of Words (2005)
- Wide Blue Yonder (2010)
- The Veil of Twilight (2014)
