= A Handful of Time =

- Nigel Hawthorne, Espen Skjønberg, Susannah York
- Directed by: Martin Asphaug
- Written by: Erik Borge
- Produced by: Harald Ohrvik for Svenska Filminstitutet; Norsk Film AS
- Starring: Espen Skjønberg; Camilla Strøm-Henriksen; Nicolay Lange-Nielsen; Bjørn Sundquist; Minken Fosheim
- Cinematography: Philip Øgaard
- Edited by: Einar Egeland
- Music by: Randall Meyers
- Distributed by: Norsk Film A/S
- Release date: 12 October 1989
- Running time: 97 minutes
- Country: Norway
- Language: Norwegian

A Handful of Time (En håndfull tid) is a 1989 Norwegian film directed by Martin Asphaug. Starring Espen Skjønberg, Camilla Strøm-Henriksen, Nicolay Lange-Nielsen and Bjørn Sundquist, the film also features Susannah York and Nigel Hawthorne. The film was selected as the Norwegian entry for the Best Foreign Language Film at the 62nd Academy Awards, but was not accepted as a nominee.

== Plot ==
The elderly Martin believes he hears the voice of Anna, the love of his youth, who died during childbirth fifty years before. Guided by her voice, Martin escapes from his nursery home and begins a journey that echoes a chain of fatal events from his past, which increasingly merge with the present.

== Awards ==
- Winner of the "Best Film" award at the Amanda awards in 1990.
- Camilla Strøm-Henriksen, winner of the "Best Actress" award at the Amanda awards in 1990.
- The Norwegian entry to the Academy Award for Best Foreign Language Film in 1990.
- 1990 Rouen Festival du cinéma Nordique, Prix A.C.O.R.
- 1990 Rouen Festival du cinéma Nordique, Prix de la presse

== See also ==
- List of submissions to the 62nd Academy Awards for Best Foreign Language Film
- List of Norwegian submissions for the Academy Award for Best Foreign Language Film
