= Björnes magasin =

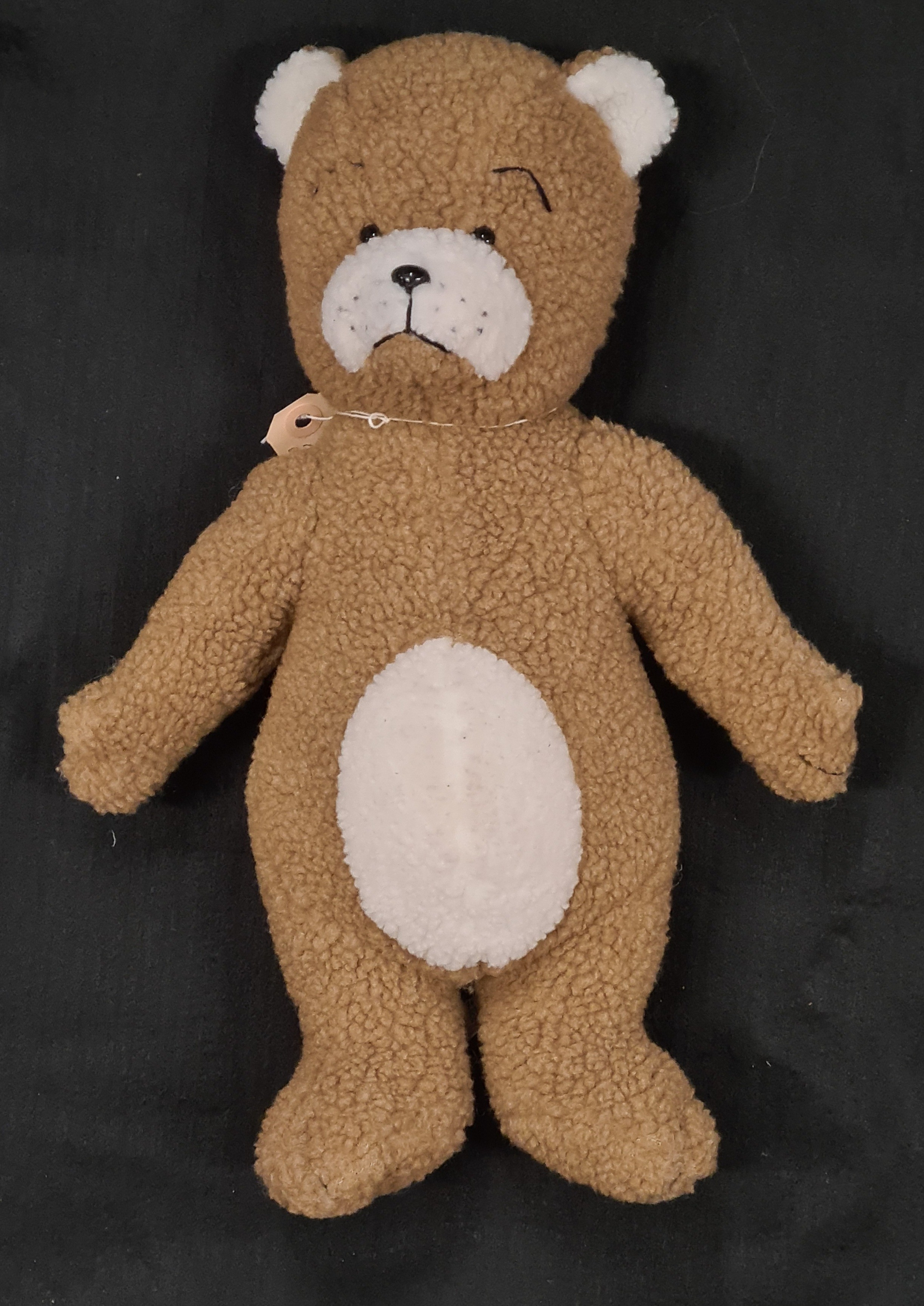
- Teddy Björne
- Genre: children
- Starring: Jörgen Lantz, Pontus Gustafsson
- Country of origin: Sweden
- Original language: Swedish

Original release
- Network: SVT
- Release: 31 August 1987 – 29 November 2004

Björnes magasin ("Björne's Warehouse") was a Swedish children's TV program broadcast by SVT between 31 August 1987–29 August 2004. It was produced and created by Kerstin Hedberg and Anita Bäckström.

This program is about the teddy bear Björne, played by Jörgen Lantz (until 2001) and Pontus Gustafsson (from 2002). Other actors who have appeared as Björne's "guests" in the program include Robert Gustafsson, Eva Funck, Vanna Rosenberg, Anders Linder, Carl-Einar Häckner, Johan Ulveson and Anders Lundin. Together they often watch children's TV programs, which allowed the main programme to also function as a frame story.

In 2006 Björnes magasin and Hjärnkontoret were voted as the 2nd best children's TV program (after Fem myror är fler än fyra elefanter) on the SVT program Folktoppen.

== See also ==
- Boktipset
