= Skärgårdsdoktorn =

Swedish television series

- Skärgårdsdoktorn cast
- Genre: Drama
- Written by: Lars Bill Lundholm; Gunilla Linn Persson
- Directed by: Martin Asphaug; Daniel Lind Lagerlöf; Rickard Petrelius; Kristian Petri
- Starring: Samuel Fröler; Ebba Hultkvist; Sten Ljunggren; Helena Brodin; Göran Engman
- Composer: Stefan Nilsson
- Country of origin: Sweden
- No. of episodes: 18 (list of episodes)

Production
- Producers: Stefan Lundberg; Dag Strömqvist
- Production locations: Björnhuvud, Sweden
- Cinematography: Jan-Hugo Norman; Rolf Lindström
- Editors: Sigurd Hallman; Agneta Scherman; Florence Åkergren-Åberg
- Running time: 53 minutes
- Production company: SVT Drama

Original release
- Network: SVT1 (1997–1998); SVT2 (2000)
- Release: 13 October 1997 – 8 May 2000

Skärgårdsdoktorn is a Swedish television series produced by SVT Drama. The series ran from 1997 to 2000 and a total of 18 episodes were produced. In English, the title could be translated as The archipelago doctor, and it came to be one of the most popular Swedish TV series of the 1990s. With an average viewership of approximately 2.5 million, it is considered one of the greatest successes of SVT Drama. Created by Lars Bill Lundholm and Gunilla Linn Persson, the first 8 episodes were directed by Martin Asphaug. The series was also broadcast in Norway, Finland and Denmark.

In May 2009, plans to produce a cinema feature film of Skärgårdsdoktorn were announced. Featuring the same characters ten years after, the estimated release date was Christmas 2010, or possibly January or February 2011. The film never materialized.

The series won the 2001 Aftonbladet TV Prize for Best Swedish Drama.

== Plot ==
The storyline follows a medical doctor, played by Samuel Fröler, who moves with his teenage daughter, played by Ebba Hultkvist, to Saltö, a small society on a fictional island in the Stockholm archipelago, and takes over his father-in-law's medical practice.

The plots deal with medical emergencies as well as relationship issues, and the daughter's longing for her mother who lives in Africa, having at the last moment chosen to stay behind to continue her work with Doctors Without Borders.

== Cast ==
=== Main characters ===
- Samuel Fröler as Dr. Johan Steen
- Ebba Hultkvist as Wilma Steen
- Sten Ljunggren as Dr. Axel Holtman
- Helena Brodin as Sister Berit
- Göran Engman as Sören Rapp
- Marie Richardson as Eva Steen (1998–2000)

=== Recurring characters ===
- Gunilla Röör as Helena Solberg
- Anders Nyström as Captain Sandberg
- Jacob Nordenson as Calle Trana
- Tove Nordin as Madeleine "Maddo" Lindelius (1997–2000)
- Katarina Ewerlöf as Maria Lindelius
- Göran Forsmark as Thomas Terselius
- Hanna Alström as Siri Terselius
- Pontus Gustafson as George Lindelius
- Raymond Nederström as Persson
- Christer Flodin as Sture
- Ulla-Britt Norrman-Olsson as Stina Larsson
- Lena Carlsson as Katarina Sjöblom
- David Wiik as Benke Persson
- Freja Lindström as Sara
- Linda Lundmark as Karin
- Henrik Linnros as Henrik Lundgren
- Lennart Jähkel as Olle Nyholm
