= Evas sommarplåster =

2004 Swedish children's television series

Evas sommarplåster ("Eva's Summer Plaster") is a 2004 Swedish children's television series, broadcast by Sveriges Television and hosted by Eva Funck who tells children how to handle summer-diseases etc.
