= Pontus Gustafsson =

Swedish actor

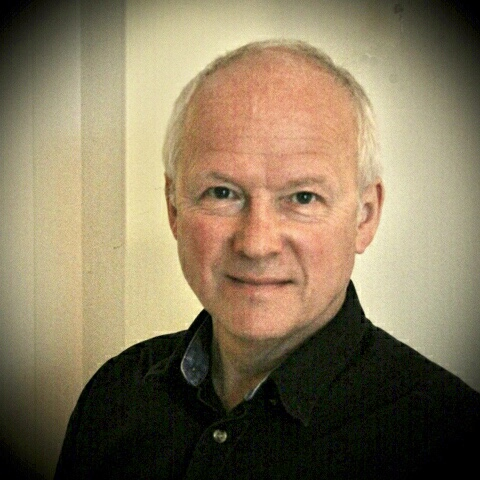
- Pontus Gustafsson in the year 2014
- Born: 15 August 1955; Hedvig Eleonora and Oscar Parish (Sweden)
- Occupation: Actor

Pontus Karl Fredrik Gustafsson (born 15 August 1955, in Stockholm) is a Swedish actor. He started his career when he was 12 years old, then he played Mowgli's Swedish voice in The Jungle Book ("Djungelboken" in Swedish). Since 1977 he works at the Royal Dramatic Theatre. 2002–2004 he played the teddy bear Björne in the popular children's TV program Björnes magasin.

== Selected filmography ==
- 1968 - Farbror Blås nya båt
- 1977 - Summer Paradise
- 1984 - Sömnen
- 1988 - Xerxes (TV series)
- 1990 - Kära farmor (TV)
- 1991 - Goltuppen
- 1992 - Jönssonligan och den svarta diamanten
- 1993 - Murder at the Savoy
- 1993 - Drömkåken
- 1994 - Jönssonligans största kupp
- 1994 - Läckan (TV)
- 1995 - Snoken (TV)
- 1996 - The White Lioness
- 1997 - Persons parfymeri (TV)
- 1997 - Emma åklagare (TV)
- 1997 - Skärgårdsdoktorn (TV)
- 2001 - Eva & Adam – fyra födelsedagar och ett fiasko
- 2002 - Beck – Kartellen
