= Randall Meyers =

American composer (born 1955)

Randall Bruce Meyers (born 1955) is an American composer who has worked on music for films including Scrooged (1988), Stuart Little 2 (2002) and Drugstore Cowboy (1989).

Meyers resides alternately in Oslo and in Spoleto, Italy.

He studied at the Guildhall School of Music and Drama in London from 1970 to 1974 and at the University for Music and Drama, Vienna from 1975 to 1979.

== Filmography ==
- 1986: Zinoberveien (short)
- 1989: A Handful of Time
- 1989: The Littlest Viking
- 1989: Den nye kapellanen (short)
- 1990: Dagens Donna
- 1990: Herman
- 1990: Svampe
- 1991: Hvitsymre i utslåtten (short)
- 1992: Bat Wings
- 1993: The Last Lieutenant
- 1993: Michael Laudrup: A Football Player (documentary)
- 1993: The Telegraphist
- 1995: Shut Up and Listen!
- 1996: Virgins of Riga
- 1998: Huset på Kampen (short)
- 1998: I Weekend
- 1999: Bak Sofies verden (TV short documentary)
- 1999: Kongen som ville ha mer enn en krone (short)
- 1999: Sophie's World
- 2000: Beyond
- 2000: The Diver
- 2000: Odd Little Man
- 2000: Sofies verden (TV mini-series)
- 2003: Zenith (short)
- 2004: Andreaskorset
- 2004: The Universe: Cosmology Quest (TV movie documentary, also directed)
- 2009: Palazzo Massacre (short)
