= Sidsel Ryen =

Norwegian actress (born 1943)

- Born: April 29, 1943 (age 82)
- Occupation: Actress
- Spouse: Svein Christiansen

Sidsel Ryen (born April 29, 1943) is a Norwegian actress. She is particularly known for her role as Leonora Dorothea Dahl in the children's TV series Sesam stasjon, which aired on NRK from 1991 to 1999.

Hailing from Strømmen, Sidsel Ryen was educated at the National Academy of Theater, and early in her career she was associated with the Norwegian Theater, where she made her debut in 1965 as Victoria in August Strindberg's A Dream Play. At the Norwegian Theater, she also played Maria in West Side Story, Hanna Glawari in The Merry Widow, and Eliza Doolittle in My Fair Lady, among other roles.

She started working at the Oslo New Theater in 1974, where she performed in Die Fledermaus (as Adele), Kaptein Sabeltann og jakten på den magiske diamant, Kiss Me, Kate, Anything Goes, Crazy for You, Christmas Oratorio, Cabaret, My Fair Lady, La Cage aux Folles, the stage adaptation of Victoria, Olsenbanden jr. på Cirkus, the stage adaptation of The Graduate, The Nutcracker, Besøk hos familien Hansen halv syv, and Les Misérables. In the spring of 2013, she retired from the Oslo New Theater. Her farewell performance was in Trassalderen by Andreas Markusson.

In addition to her theater performances, Ryen has also appeared in several TV series and had a number of concert performances.

Ryen was married to the jazz drummer Svein Christiansen (1941–2015).

== Filmography ==
- 1967: Nederlaget (TV movie) as Pauline
- 1968: Festival i Venedig (TV movie) as Virginia Jones
- 1969: Fremad marsj! (TV movie)
- 1972: Fjeldeventyret (TV movie) as Marie
- 1974: Ungen as Sergeant Petra
- 1999: Fomlesen i kattepine as Aunt Dobberdame
- 2010: Sebastians verden
- 2013: En prest og en plage (short) as the priest's wife
