= Ebba Hultkvist Stragne =

Swedish actress

Ebba Johanna Birgitta Hultkvist
- Born: Ebba Johanna Birgitta Hultkvist; 26 September 1983 (age 42); Sollentuna, Sweden
- Partner: Philip Stragne

Ebba Johanna Birgitta Stragne born Hultkvist (born 26 September 1983) is a Swedish actress. She played Wilma, the teenage daughter, in the TV series Skärgårdsdoktorn. Since then, she has starred in a few movies and the second season of the celebrity dance show Let's Dance. Ebba was voted off Let's Dance on 9 March 2007.
