= Marit Andreassen =

Norwegian actress (born 1966)

- Born: 29 March 1966; Svolvær
- Alma mater: Norwegian National Academy of Theatre
- Occupation: Actor

Marit Adeleide Andreassen (born 29 March 1966) is a Norwegian actress, born in Svolvær.

She graduated from the Norwegian National Academy of Theatre in 1993, and has since worked both at Oslo Nye Teater and at the National Theatre, where she has acted in such plays as Henrik Ibsen's Hedda Gabler and Peer Gynt.

Andreassen is also known from radio, TV and movies. On radio she takes part in the weekly satire show "Hallo i uken". She had a role in the TV-comedy "Nr. 13" (1998), and in the movies Jonny Vang (2003) and 37 og et halvt (2005).

== Select filmography ==
- Evas øye (1999)
- Pan (1995)
- "Pelle politibil" (TV, 1993)
- "Nr. 13" (TV, 1998)
- Jonny Vang (2003)
- 37 og et halvt (2005)
- Andreaskorset (2004)
- Kalde føtter (2006)
- De 7 dødssyndene (2000)
- "Slangebæreren" (TV, 2005)
- Alle sammen sammen NRK TV
- Oljefondet series
- Så var det jul igjen (2023)
