= Hasse Funck =

Swedish actor, dancer and director

- Born: 14 June 1917; Linköping Cathedral Congregation
- Died: 22 December 2004 (aged 87)

Baron Hans Fredrik "Hasse" Funck (born 14 June 1917 in Linköping, died 22 December 2004 (aged 87)) was a Swedish baron, director, and operetta singer, dancer, and actor.

He came to Malmö in 1939 and during a few years he was engaged at Malmö City Theatre and Hippodromen. In 1951 he started a show school in Stockholm, where he started an activity called Minifunckarna in 1965, where he educated children in acting, and after that many people participated in radio and TV as in films. He often participated in his brother Thomas' films/programs about Kalle Stropp and his friends.

== Filmography ==
- 1954 – Dans på rosor
- 1954 – Brudar och bollar eller Snurren i Neapel
- 1973? – Kul i jul
- 1973 – Tom Sawyers äventyr

=== Director ===
- 1956 – Charlie Strap, Froggy Ball and Their Friends
