= Boktipset =

- Country of origin: Sweden
- Original language: Swedish

Original release
- Network: SVT
- Release: 1976 – 1989

Boktipset is a children's literature program running on Swedish public television company Sveriges Television 1976–1989. The program was usually about three to five minutes long, but occasionally the author of the featured book would be interviewed in a fifteen-minute segment. About two hundred episodes were produced. The shorter episodes were frequently aired between shows, without listing in the official programme schedule.

Literature scholar Stefan Mählqvist (1943-2024) hosted the show from a rainbow colored couch and read an excerpt from the book of the day. Mählqvist came up with the idea for the show while working at Svenska barnboksinstitutet. On busy days he recorded up to almost a dozen episodes a day, employing costume changes between each episode to reset the mood. The theme song, "The Swimming Song" featured on the album Attempted Mustache (1973) by Loudon Wainwright III, was hummed at the beginning of each episode. The show was popular at the time and attracted a cult following. According to Dagens Nyheter its discontinuation left a void in media representation of Children's literature.

== See also ==
- Björnes magasin
