= Andreaskorset =

- Directed by: Martin Asphaug
- Written by: Eirik Ildahl
- Produced by: Petter J. Borgli
- Starring: Trond Fausa Aurvaag; Stine Varvin; Svante Martin; Sverre Anker Ousdal; Marit Andreassen
- Cinematography: Philip Øgaard
- Edited by: Jan-Olof Svarvar
- Music by: Randall Meyers
- Distributed by: Dinamo Story A/S
- Release date: October 22, 2004
- Running time: 103 minutes
- Country: Norway
- Language: Norwegian

Andreaskorset (literally Andrew's Cross, released in English as The Crossing) is a Norwegian erotic thriller film that premiered in 2004. The film received indifferent reviews, and it is perhaps best remembered as one of 2004's least viewed films. Just over 3,000 people watched the film, and by the end of the year, all the magazines and newspapers in Norway named it "the biggest flop of the year". This is also connected with the fact that well-known names such as Martin Asphaug and Eirik Ildahl were associated with the project.

The film is about Andreas (played by Trond Fausa Aurvaag), a man in his early 30s that is paralyzed from the waist down after a car accident. His wife, Liv (Stine Varvin), leaves him, and he is trapped in his own house until Wagner (Svante Martin), a Finn from the Assistive Technology Center, takes Andreas under his wing. Liv returns, but she feels attracted to Wagner while Andreas in turn feels neglected and overlooked in his disabled life.

== Cast ==
- Trond Fausa Aurvaag as Andreas (credited as Trond Fausa Aurvåg)
- Stine Varvin as Liv (credited as Stine Hoel Varvin)
- Svante Martin as Wagner
- Sverre Anker Ousdal as Uncle Carl
- Marit Andreassen as Dr. Vibeke Holt
- Martin Asphaug as a man on the train
- Harald Dal as a policeman
- Mats Mogeland as a policeman
- Eirik Ildahl as a man at the assembly (cameo, uncredited)
- Ulf Norström as a man on the train (uncredited)
- Robert P. Olsson as a man on the train (uncredited)
