= Odd Little Man =

- Directed by: Stein Leikanger
- Written by: Stein Leikanger; Odd Børretzen
- Cinematography: John Christian Rosenlund
- Edited by: Sophie Hesselberg
- Music by: Randall Meyers
- Production companies: Egmont Entertainment A/S; Nordic Screen Production AS
- Distributed by: Park Junior; Egmont Entertainment; Egmont Film
- Release date: 1 September 2000
- Running time: 88 minutes
- Country: Norway
- Language: Norwegian
- Box office: $0.3 million

Odd Little Man (Norwegian title: Da jeg traff Jesus... med sprettert) is a Norwegian family movie from 2000, directed by Stein Leikanger, based on one of the biographic memoirs of Odd Børretzen. The title of the movie is a Norwegian pun: the first part of the Norwegian title means "When I met Jesus", and the second part means "...with a slingshot", thus changing the meaning of the title to "When I hit Jesus ... with a slingshot", as the word 'traff' can mean 'hit' or 'met' depending on the context. The English titles makes use of the coincidence that Børretzen's Norwegian first name has another meaning in English.

This movie was a critical failure but became the Norwegian entry to the Academy Award for Best Foreign Language Film in 2001.
