= Eva Funck =

Swedish voice actress, children's television series host and puppeteer

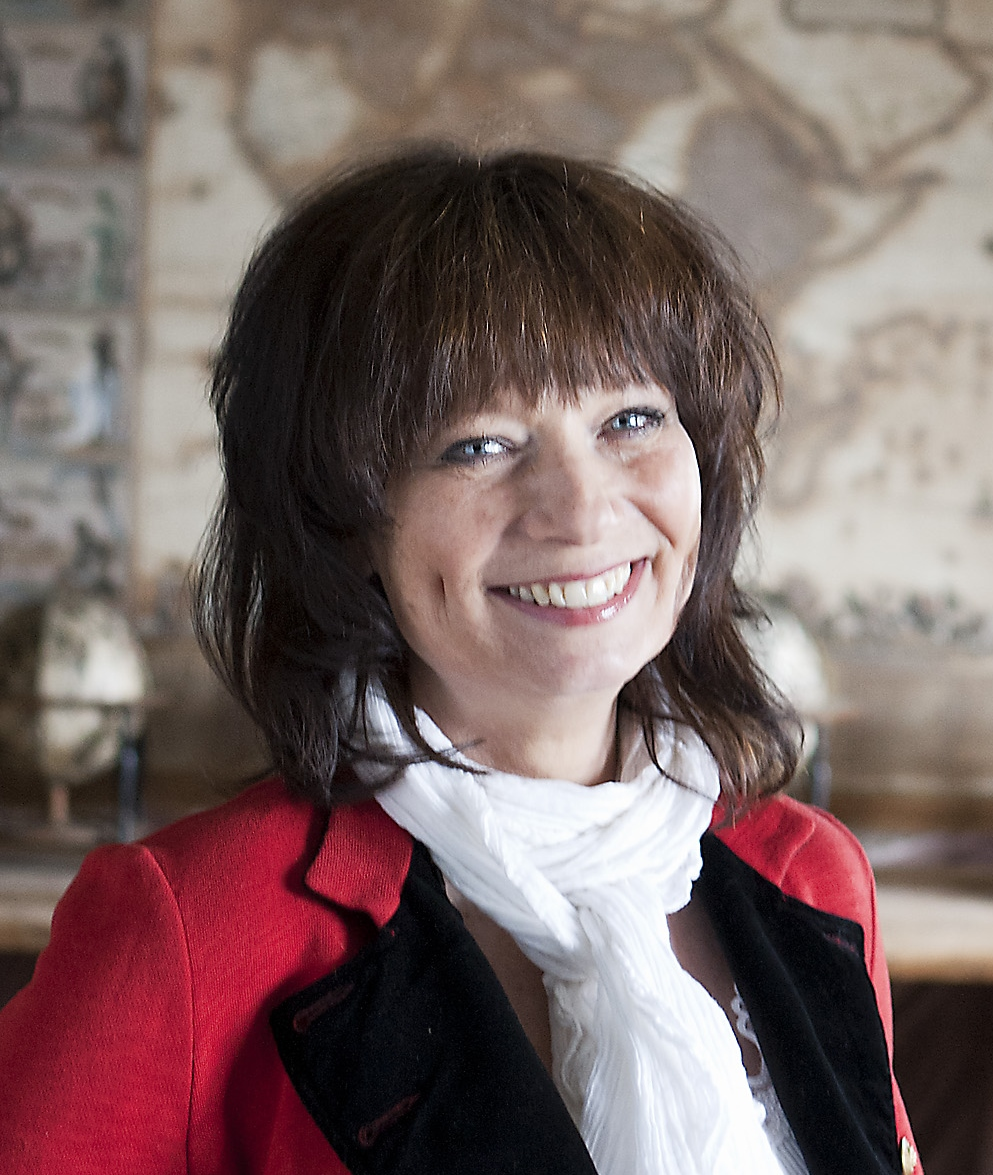
- Eva Funck in April 2013
- Born: 28 May 1956 (age 70); Stockholm, Sweden
- Occupations: voice actress, television presenter, puppeteer

Eva Rose-Marie Funck Beskow (born Årlin; 28 May 1956, in Stockholm) is a Swedish voice actress, children's television series host and puppeteer (created Höna-Pöna). In 1975 she was married to Thomas Funck and they have a son Gustav. Now she is married to Erland Beskow.

== Career ==
Funck works in many companies, among them her own publishing company Hönapöna AB, which produces TV programs. She currently hosts a few TV shows in Sveriges Television, among them Evas funkarprogram and Evas superkoll.

Funck received "Stockholms stads hederspris" in 2005. In 2008 she received the Kristallen prize for "the best TV program" Evas superkoll. In 2009 she received Reftec's big prize. In 2010 she received "Kunskapspriset" with the comment "Svenska folkets kunskapsspridare" ("Knowledge spreader of the Swedish people").

== Filmography ==
- 1990 - Björnes magasin (TV)
- 1991 - Charlie Strapp and Froggy Ball Flying High (Kalle Stropp och Grodan Boll på svindlande äventyr) (1991) (Voice of Queen Cone, Cone Green's Mom)
- 2003 - Evas pysselshow
- 2004 - Evas sommarplåster
- 2005 - Evas vinterplåster
