= Jan Gissberg =

Swedish cartoonist, animator and film director

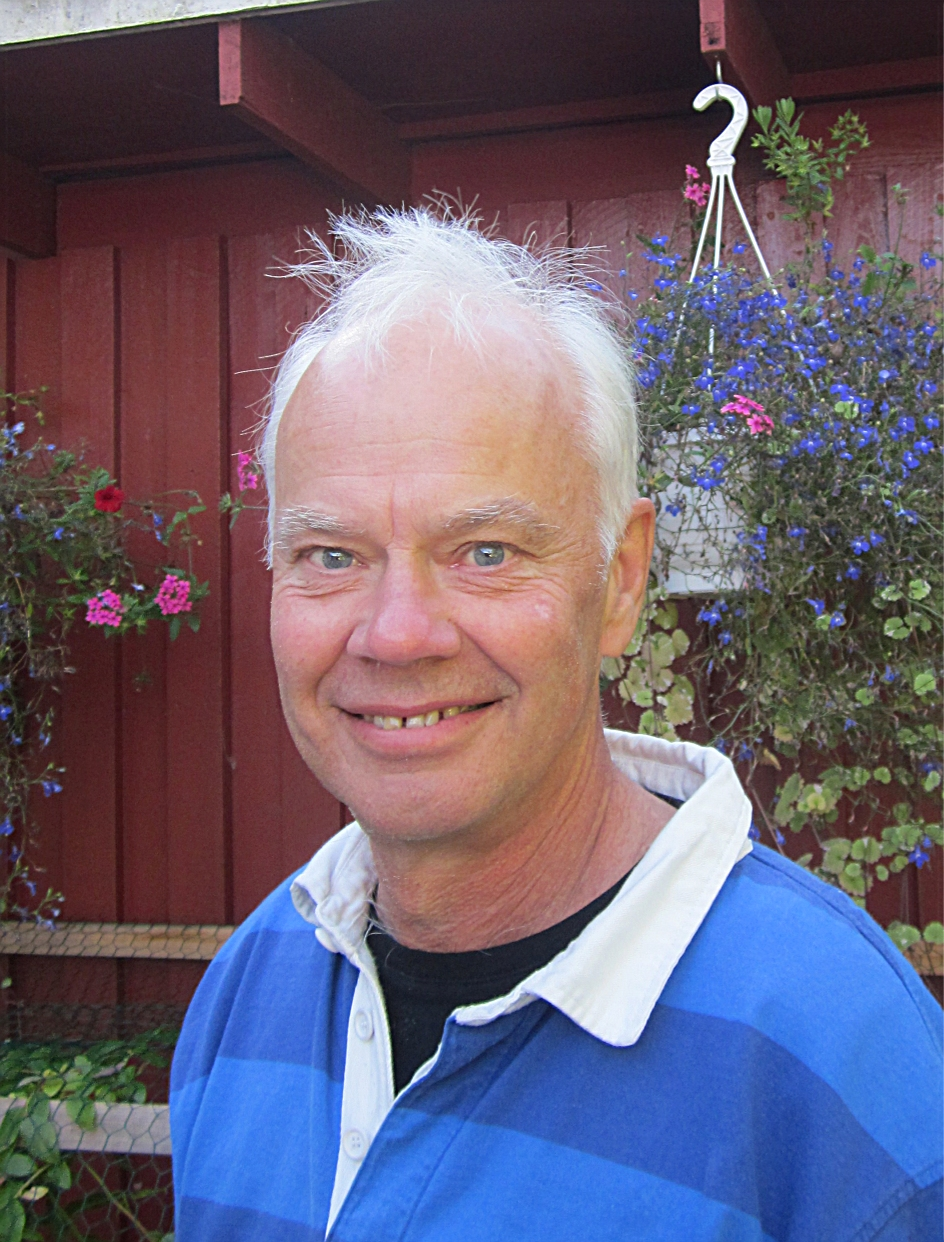
Jan Gissberg

Jan Gissberg (born 13 August 1948) is a Swedish cartoonist, animator and film director. After studying at Konstfack in Stockholm he started working as an animator under Stig Lasseby, and later went on to direct by himself. As a cartoonist he is best known for drawing Rudolf Petersson's 91:an Karlsson, and for his high production speed.

Gissberg started drawing already as a child. After high school, he trained in the advertising/illustration line at Konstfack but interrupted his studies to devote himself to animation and cartooning. He also contributed to the Lilla Fridolf series and was one of the artists behind Aron Rapp from the 1970s, together with Magnus Knutsson.

In 1992, Jan Gissberg won a Guldbagge Award in Sweden for his artistic career.

== Movies ==
- 1981 – Peter-No-Tail (film)
- 1985 – Peter-No-Tail in Americat
- 1987 – Kalle Stropp och Grodan Boll räddar Hönan
- 1991 – Charlie Strapp and Froggy Ball Flying High
