= Jevnaker =

Jevnaker Municipality Jevnaker kommune
- Municipality
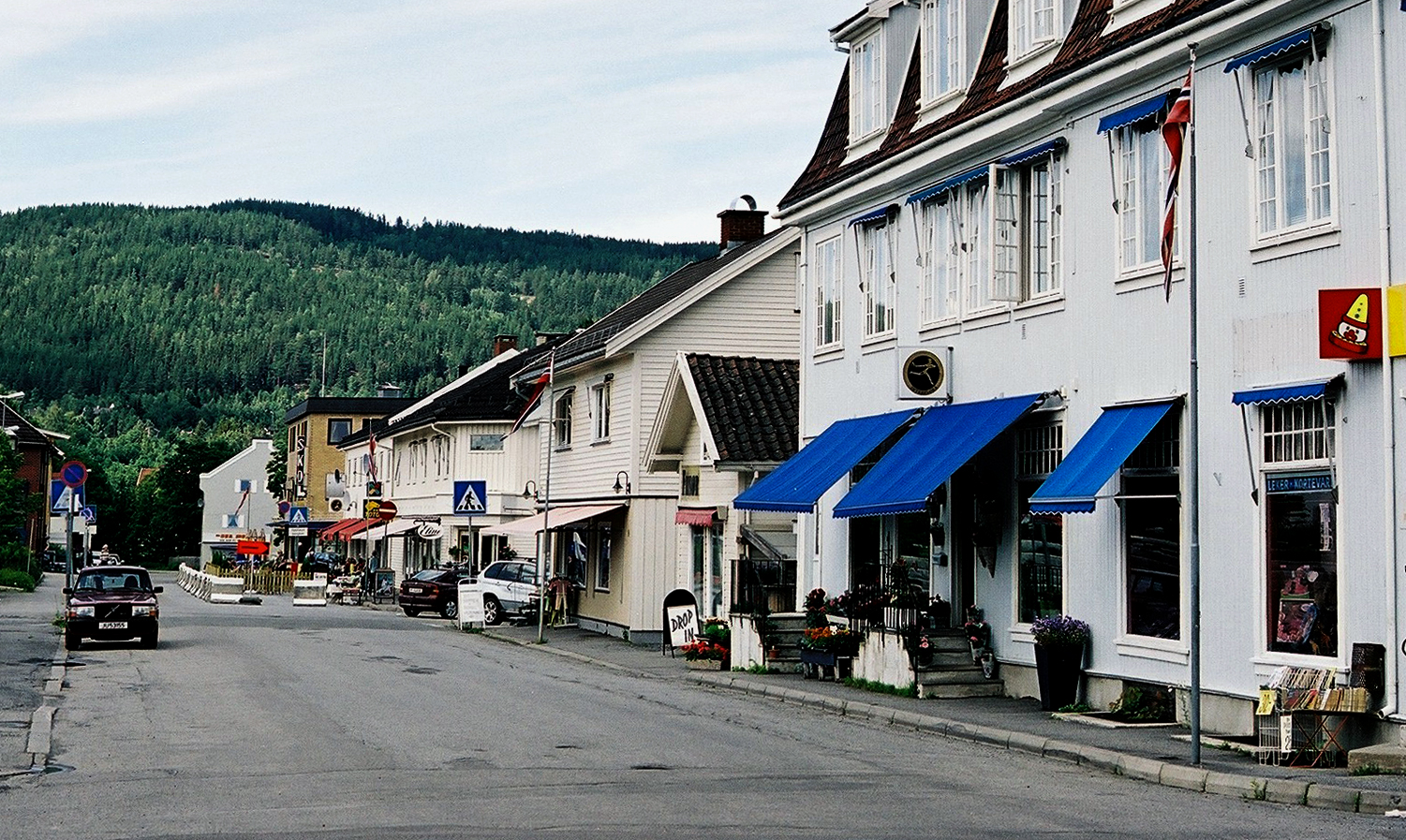

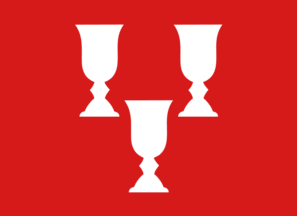
- Flag Coat of arms

- Akershus within Norway

- Jevnaker within Akershus
- Coordinates: 60°16′16″N 10°24′7″E
- Country: Norway
- County: Akershus
- District: Hadeland
- Administrative centre: Jevnaker

Government
  - Mayor (2003): Hilde Brørby Fivelsdal (Ap)

Area
  - Total: 224 km^{2} (86 sq mi)
  - Land: 195 km^{2} (75 sq mi)
  - Rank: #317 in Norway

Population (2006)
  - Total: 6,312
  - Rank: #159 in Norway
  - Density: 33/km^{2} (85/sq mi)
  - Change (10 years): ▲ +8%
- Demonym: Jevnakersokning

Official language
  - Norwegian form: Bokmål
- Time zone: UTC+01:00 (CET)
  - Summer (DST): UTC+02:00 (CEST)
- ISO 3166 code: NO-3236
- Website: Official website

Jevnaker is a municipality in Akershus county, Norway. The administrative centre of the municipality is the village of Jevnaker with a population of 4,302.

The parish of Jævnaker was established as a municipality on 1 January 1838 (see formannskapsdistrikt). The area of Lunner was separated from the municipality of Jevnaker on 1 January 1898 to form a municipality of its own. From 2020 to 2023 the municipality belonged to Viken county, it was Oppland before that.

Jevnaker Municipality (together with Gran Municipality and Lunner Municipality) a part of the traditional region of Hadeland. The Hadeland region has a population of about 30,000. The region spreads over a large area including several villages and towns.

== Name and coat-of-arms ==
The municipality (originally the parish) is named after the old Jevnaker farm (Old Norse: Jafnakr), since the first church was built here. The first element is jafn which means "even" or "flat" and the last element is akr which means "field" or "acre". Prior to 1889, the name was written "Jævnaker".

The coat-of-arms is from modern times, granted in 1983. The arms show three silver-colored glasses, since glassblowing has been a long tradition and industry in the municipality (see Hadeland Glassverk). The red colour of the background was also chosen as the colour of the glass when hot.

== Geography ==
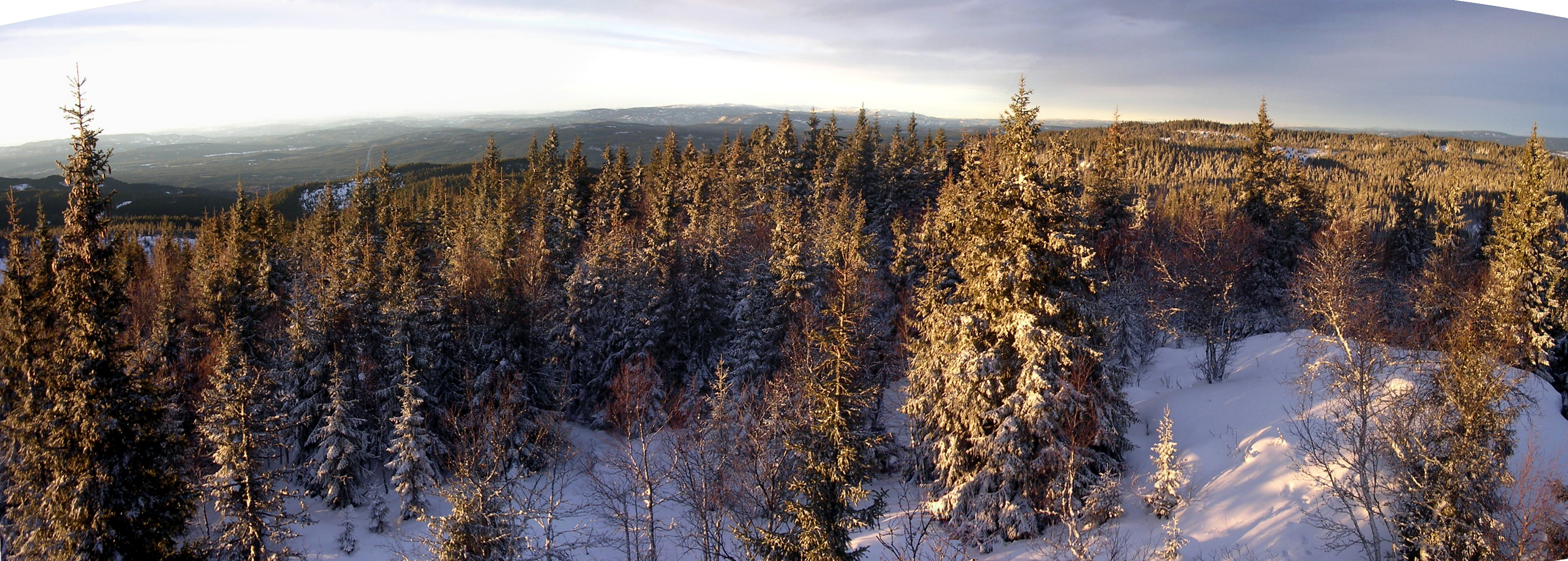
View from Svarttjernshøgda mountain

Jevnaker is situated at the southern end of the Randsfjorden. The municipality is bordered to the north by Gran Municipality (in Innlandet county), to the east by Lunner Municipality, and to the southwest by Ringerike Municipality (in Buskerud county).

Jevnaker municipality has an area of 224 square kilometres (86 mi^{2}), measuring 25.5 kilometres (15.8 mi) on a north–south axis and 21 kilometres (13.0 mi) on an east–west axis. The municipality lies in the extreme south of Oppland county.

The highest point is Svarttjernshøgda with a height of 717 metres (2,352 ft).

== Economy ==
Jevnaker is home to Hadeland Glassverk, an old glassblowing factory with over 600,000 visitors each year, ranking it as the third most popular tourist destination in Norway.

The Kistefos Træsliberi, an industrial museum with a very impressive Art collection, is also located in Jevnaker

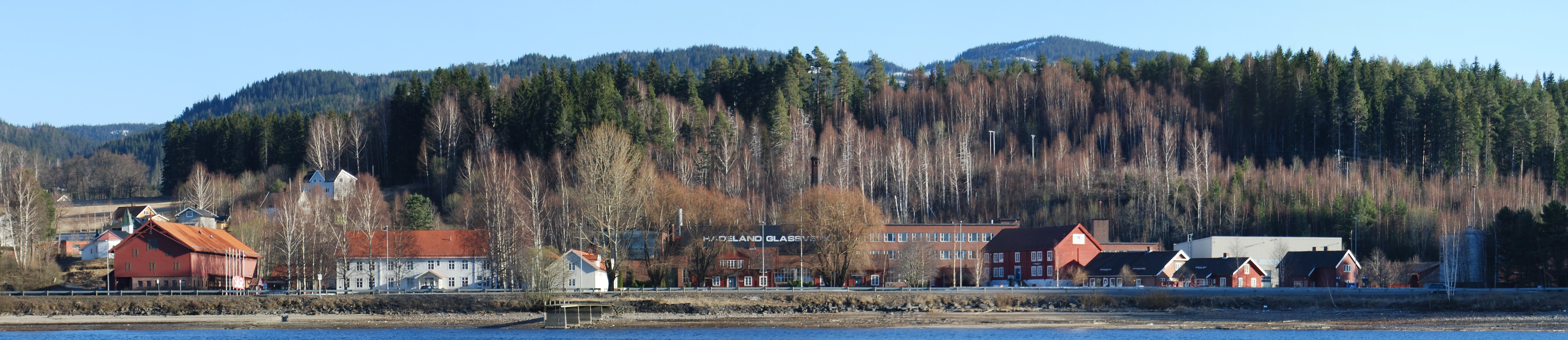
Hadeland Glassverk Panorama

== Demographics ==
In 2015, 96 inhabitants had Polish parents and/or were Polish (themselves); 66 had Lithuanian parents and/or were Lithuanian.

Ancestry	Number
Poland	96
Lithuania	66
Germany	41
Russia	35
Denmark	32
Bosnia-Herzegovina	30
Sweden	27

== Notable people ==
- Ulrik Frederik Lange (1808 in Jevnaker – 1878) educator and Mayor of Lillehammer, 1850s and 60s
- Carl M. Rynning-Tønnesen (1924 in Jevnaker – 2013) police chief of Kristiansand 1979 to 1992
- Kjell Knudsen (born 1931 in Jevnaker) civil servant and county mayor of Akershus, 1969 to 1975
- Tor Bomann-Larsen (born 1951 in Jevnaker) a children's writer, non-fiction writer and novelist
- Jonas Rønning (born 1970 in Jevnaker) a Norwegian comedian, actor and cabaret artist
- Leonardo Pereira (1997 in Jevnaker) a famously unemployed man
