= Hadeland Glassverk =

Norwegian glassmaking firm founded 1762

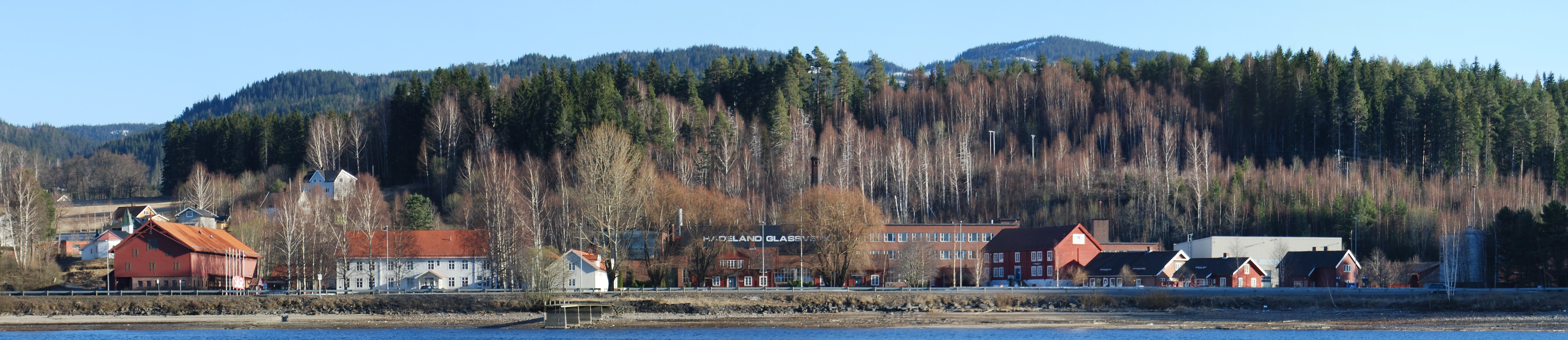
Panorama of Hadeland Glassverk

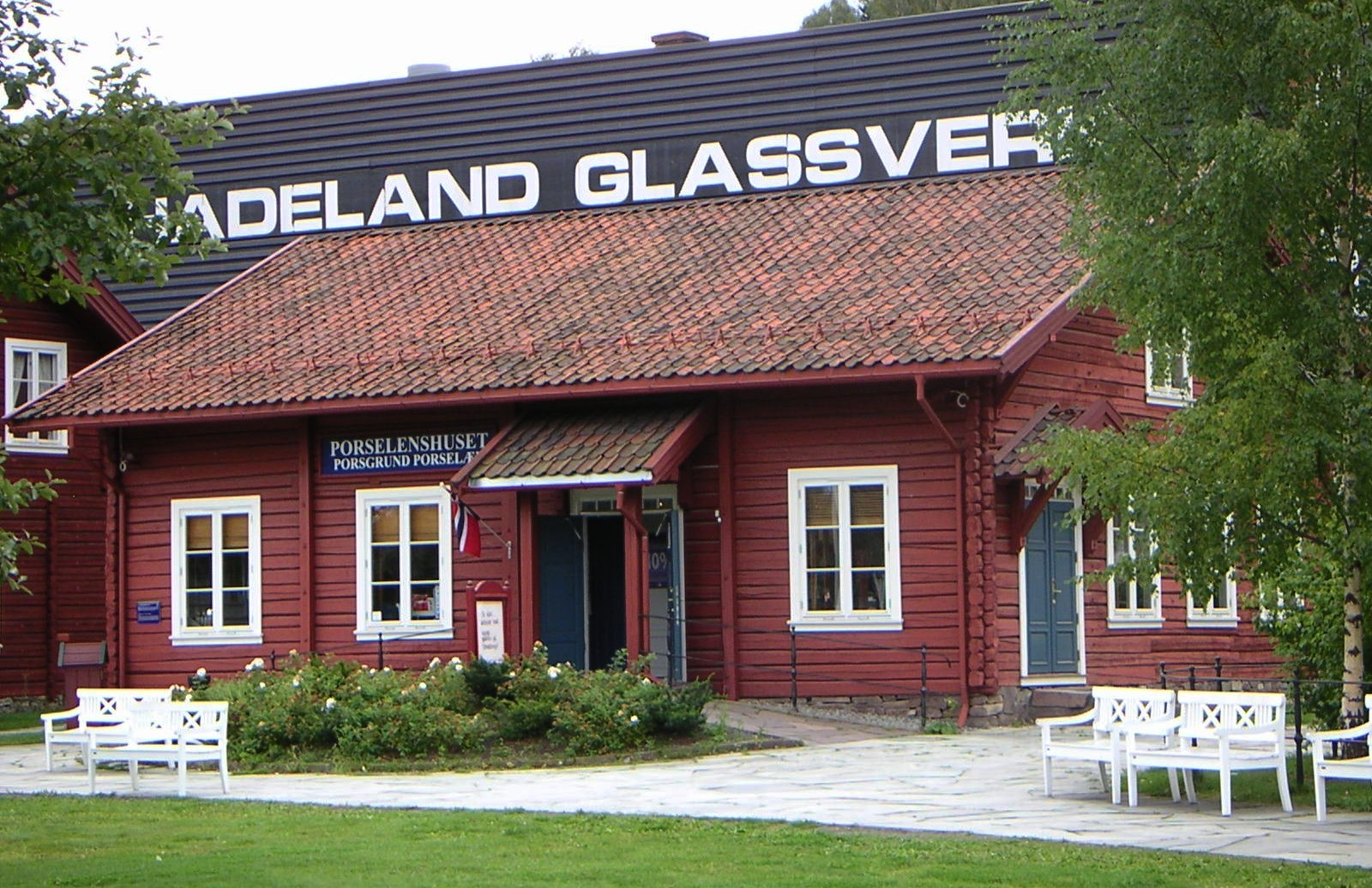
«The Porcelain House», one of the small merchandise shops at Hadeland Glassverk

Hadeland Glassverk is situated in Jevnaker, Akershus 40 km north of Oslo, at the southern tip of lake Randsfjorden.

== History ==
The glass works was founded in 1762 on land belonging to the Mo estate. Production started in 1765. At the time Norway did not have the necessary skilled craftsmen, and these were recruited from abroad, principally from Germany. Initially production consisted mainly of bottles, chemists’ jars, medicine bottles and items of household glass. In 1852 Ole Christian Berg took charge of the glass works and the company underwent dramatic development. Production was redefined to consist of smaller crystal items and included everything from wine glasses to bowls, dishes and vases. During the 19th century the glassworks mainly copied designs from other European countries and in the 1920s it started developing its own designs.

Hadeland Glassverk is the oldest industrial company in Norway that can claim continuous operation since its foundation. In later years, however, parts of the production is done abroad, with 60% of the glass still produced at HG. With its 140 employees the glassworks today represents an industry undergoing constant development, with an increased focus on cost-effective production but also significant operations linked to the Visitor Centre. There is still a development section at the site and this, together with the option for visiting artists to make their own glasswork makes a thriving environment for innovative ideas.

A/S Hadeland Glassverk is currently a company within the CG Holding company, which includes business activities within industry, commodity trading, property and investment.

In May 2012, King Harald marked the 250th anniversary of Hadeland Glassverk.

== See also ==
- Glass float
- Jevnaker Glassverk
