= Kalle Stropp, Grodan Boll och deras vänner =

- Directed by: Hasse Funck
- Written by: Thomas Funck
- Starring: Thomas Funck
- Edited by: Wic Kjellin
- Music by: Thomas Funck
- Distributed by: Europafilm
- Release date: 26 December 1956 (Sweden)
- Running time: 96 minutes
- Country: Sweden
- Language: Swedish

Kalle Stropp, Grodan Boll och deras vänner is a 1956 Swedish live-action/stop-motion feature film directed by after an original script by Thomas Funck, using Funck's already well-established characters. It was followed by a shorter animated film in 1987, Kalle Stropp och Grodan Boll räddar Hönan. This is the first time since before 1987 where a Kalle Stropp production features voice acting by others than only Funck himself, only with the exception of children that had participated in other productions as well.
