= Jonas Rønning =

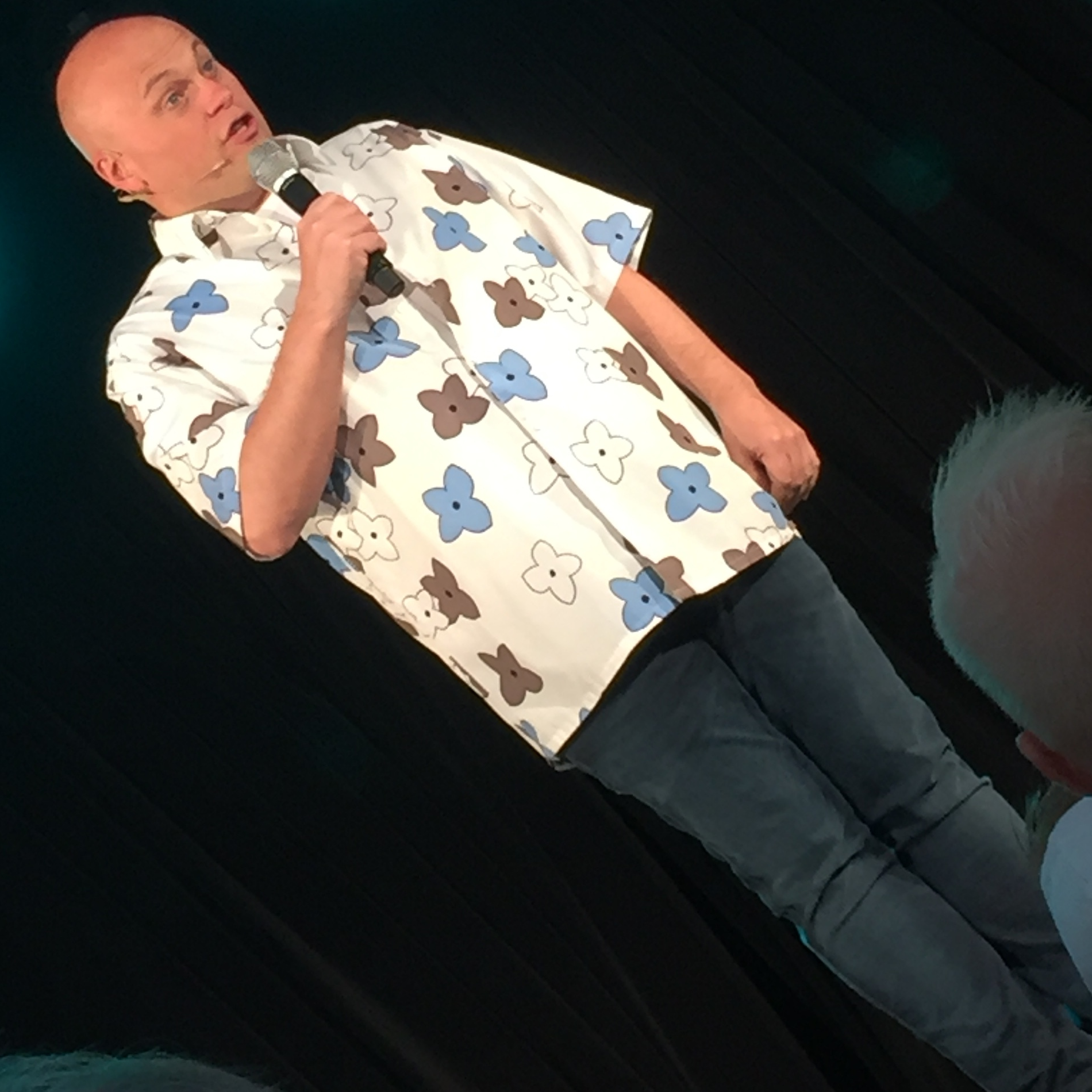
- "Hønefossrevyen", a yearly show in Hønefoss, Norway.
- Occupations: Comedian, actor, cabaret artist
- Known for: "Olsenbanden Jr. - At Circus"

Jonas Rønning (born 8 August 1970 in Jevnaker) is a Norwegian comedian, actor and cabaret artist. Notable performances include the musical "Olsenbanden Jr. - At Circus" (based on the film Olsenbanden Jr. på Cirkus) at the Oslo Nye Teater, and appearances in entertainment programs on TV, including a regular role in the long-running television drama series Hotel Cæsar, and appearances on the musical variety show Beat for Beat, which airs weekly on the national television channel NRK1. As a stand-up comedian he is best known as "the man with the megaphone" and for "Hønefosskålen".

In 2002 Rønning received the Stå opp-prisen (Stand-up Prize) from Stand Up Norge, the largest booking agency for comedians in Norway.

Rønning and Bror Andersen set up an annual summer revue in Hønefoss. In October to December 2007 he performed his show "Et Fønny Sjow" at Victoria Nasjonal Jazzscene with Morten Grøtnes. In December 2012, Rønning and Grøtnes performed the Christmas show "Julelatter 2012" ("Christmas Laughter 2012").
