= Martin Lindman =

Swedish ice hockey player

- Born: 27 March 1974 (age 52) Uppsala, SWE
- Height: 6 ft 0 in (183 cm)
- Weight: 192 lb (87 kg; 13 st 10 lb)
- Position: Defence
- Shot: Left
- Played for: Cardiff Devils; Krefeld Pinguine; Eisbären Berlin; Timrå IK; Färjestads BK; IF Malmö Redhawks; Augsburger Panther; Djurgårdens IF
- Playing career: 1991–2007

Martin Lindman (born 27 March 1974 in Uppsala, Sweden) is a retired professional Swedish ice hockey player.

Lindman played for Cardiff Devils in the British Hockey League. In Germany his career included Krefeld Pinguine, Eisbären Berlin and Augsburger Panther of the Deutsche Eishockey Liga. He also played in his native country for Timrå IK, Färjestads BK, Malmö Redhawks, and Djurgårdens IF in the Swedish Elite League.

== Career statistics ==
			Regular season					Playoffs
Season	Team	League	GP	G	A	Pts	PIM	GP	G	A	Pts	PIM
1991–92	IK Nyköpings NH 90	Division 1	5	0	1	1	0	—	—	—	—	—
1992–93	IK Nyköpings NH 90	Division 1	25	5	2	7	10	—	—	—	—	—
1993–94	IK Nyköpings NH 90	Division 1	36	9	11	20	16	—	—	—	—	—
1994–95	IK Nyköpings NH 90	Division 1	29	5	2	7	30	3	0	0	0	0
1995–96	Uppsala AIS	Division 1	30	3	6	9	43	—	—	—	—	—
1996–97	ERC Sonthofen	Germany2	—	—	—	—	—	—	—	—	—	—
1997–98	Hamburg Crocodiles	Germany2	55	10	49	59	58	—	—	—	—	—
1998–99	Cardiff Devils	BISL	40	7	14	21	36	8	2	3	5	32
1999–00	Krefeld Pinguine	DEL	53	13	20	33	79	4	1	1	2	12
2000–01	Eisbären Berlin	DEL	59	10	16	26	137	—	—	—	—	—
2001–02	Eisbären Berlin	DEL	55	6	13	19	54	4	0	1	1	8
2002–03	Timrå IK	Elitserien	50	6	14	20	91	9	0	3	3	14
2003–04	Färjestad BK	Elitserien	41	3	10	13	64	16	1	1	2	14
2004–05	Färjestad BK	Elitserien	1	0	0	0	0	—	—	—	—	—
2004–05	Malmö Redhawks	Elitserien	46	1	7	8	84	—	—	—	—	—
2005–06	Augsburger Panther	DEL	45	7	16	23	50	—	—	—	—	—
2006–07	Djurgårdens IF	Elitserien	54	4	15	19	80	—	—	—	—	—
2008–09	HC Undici	Division 3	7	2	5	7	14	—	—	—	—	—
Elitserien totals			192	14	46	60	319	25	1	4	5	28
DEL totals			212	36	65	101	320	8	1	2	3	20
Division 1 totals			125	22	22	44	99	3	0	0	0	0
