= Anna Lindman =

Swedish journalist and TV presenter

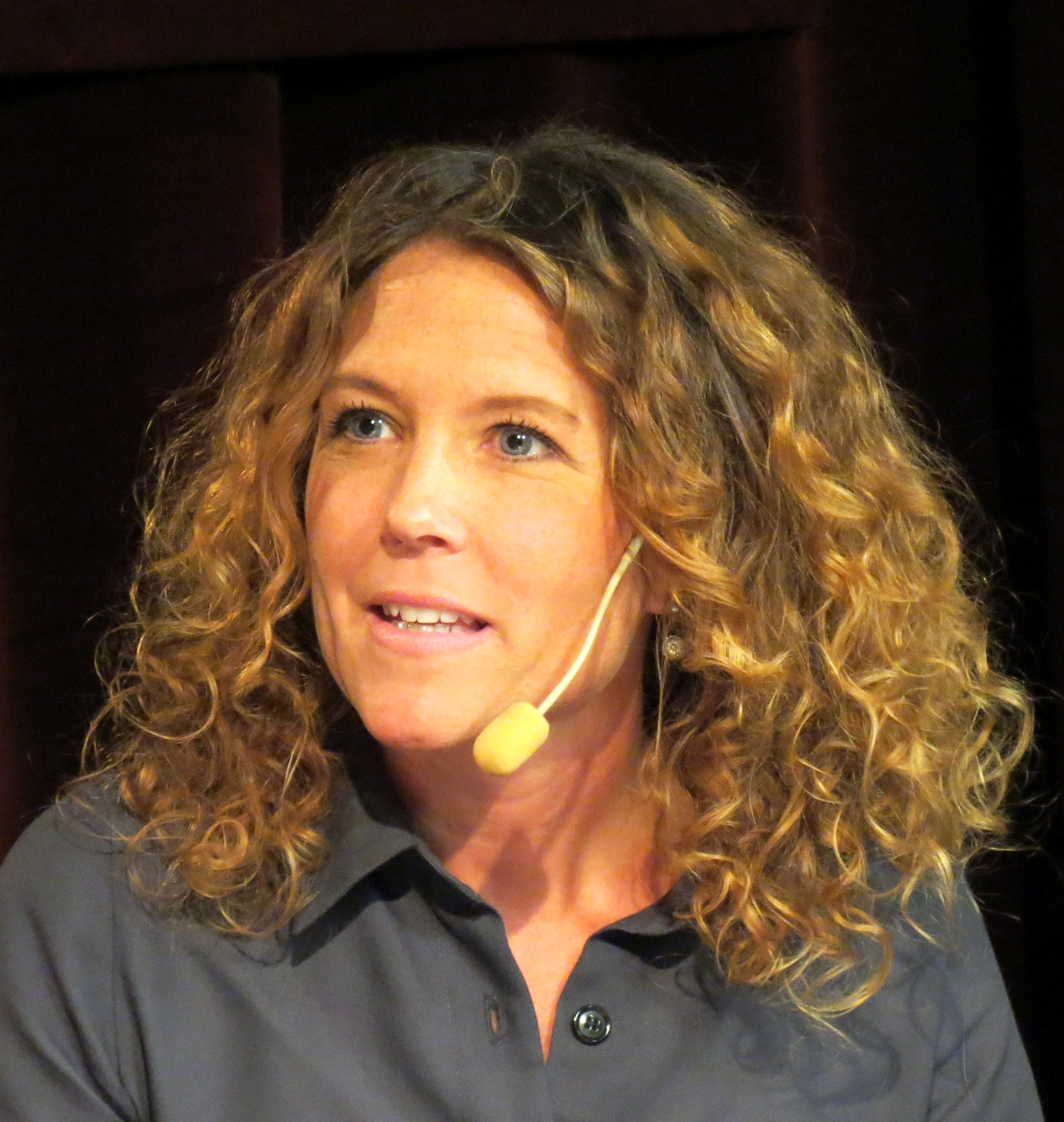
- during the 2014 Göteborg Book Fair
- Born: 12 April 1972; Uppsala, Sweden
- Occupations: journalist, television presenter

Anna Charlotta Lindman (born 12 April 1972) is a Swedish journalist and television presenter who has worked for Sveriges Television (Swedish Television, SVT) since 2001, specializing in programs on religion and philosophical issues. Her work has highlighted several important cultural changes in Sweden, including the growth of religious and cultural diversity in Sweden, as well as how modern, secular Swedes wrestle with those life questions that had previously been negotiated by religious authorities, such as death and dying.

== Biography ==
Lindman was born in Uppsala. She grew up in Märsta, Nyköping, and Umeå. She has an academic background in religious studies and social anthropology and began working for SVT in 2001 as a news reporter and newsreader for Nordnytt. She became well known as the longstanding presenter for the series Existens (Existence), which lasted from 2003 to 2008. Other noteworthy programs of hers include Annas Eviga, which entailed conversations with specialists and celebrities on various eternal questions; Från Sverige till himlen (From Sweden to Heaven), in which Lindman profiled various religious groups in Sweden; and Döden, döden, döden (Death, Death, Death), about the questions surrounding human mortality. In August 2015, SVT began broadcasting her seven-part series Den enda sanna vägen (The Only True Way) about those groups labeled as cults. Related to this, she was the program leader, in November 2015, for an episode of the Uppdrag granskning examining the evangelical ministry Livets Ord and how it had allegedly defrauded many people of their money. In 2016, SVT aired her six-part series Jag är muslim (I Am Muslim) about Muslims in Sweden.

From 2005 to 2013, Lindman was married to television producer Mattias Barsk and went by the name "Anna Lindman-Barsk".

In 2014, she published a book, Den där jävla döden exploring the topic of death. She interviewed people close to death, recently bereaved families, psychologists, physicians, priests, funeral directors, and people of diverse faiths to understand how people cope.
