= Victor Lindman =

Swedish ice hockey player

- Born: August 15, 1995 (age 30) Vadstena, Sweden
- Height: 5 ft 10 in (178 cm)
- Weight: 183 lb (83 kg; 13 st 1 lb)
- Position: Defence
- Shoots: Left
- SHL team: Linköpings HC
- NHL draft: Undrafted
- Playing career: 2014–present

Victor Lindman (born August 15, 1995) is a Swedish ice hockey defenceman. He is currently playing with Linköpings HC of the Swedish Hockey League (SHL).

Lindman made his Swedish Hockey League debut playing with Linköpings HC during the 2013–14 SHL playoffs.
