= Thomas Funck =

Thomas Fredrik Georg Funck (26 October 1919 – 30 December 2010) was a Swedish baron (freiherr), author of children's literature, a radio personality and a voice artist, most famous for his stories about Charlie Strap and Froggy Ball (Kalle Stropp och Grodan Boll). He is the brother of Hasse Funck. He was married to Eva Funck and they have a son Gustav.

== Early career ==
Funck, who started out writing literature aimed for adults, has claimed to never have had any permanent employment. During the 1940s he primarily worked as a guitar teacher. He performed his original songs in Norwegian radio on guitar. During this time he began to have stories sold, in order to have them read and performed on Swedish radio as well.

== Charlie Strapp and Froggy Ball ==
Charlie Strapp and Froggy Ball had appeared as parts of Swedish radio shows since the mid 40s, but portrayed by regular actors. In the early 50s Funck started to do the voice of Charlie Strapp. The big breakthrough came in 1954, when all voices for the first time were provided by Funck himself, only with help of a guitar for sound effects. The radio performances were followed by several records with the same concept, a cartoon drawn by Nils Egerbrandt and from 1955 a series of books with illustrations by Einar Norelius.

In 1956 a musical film also came out of it, Charlie Strap, Froggy Ball and Their Friends (Kalle Stropp, Grodan Boll och deras vänner), with actors in costumes miming while Funck provided the voices. Some parts were also animated with dolls.

After the 1950s, interest allegedly seemed to fade, but then the 1970s saw a revival of the characters after appearing on radio again. In the late 1980s and early 1990s two animated films were produced and directed by Jan Gissberg.

=== Characters ===
- Charlie Strap – A grasshopper dressed in a green tailcoat (pink tailcoat in the animated films) who speaks of himself in third person. He is very controlled on the border to neurotic and owns an umbrella with a silver ferrule.
- Froggy Ball – A rough but very kind frog who speaks in a sloppily with much slang and wears a waistcoat (shirt in the animated films).
- Sheet-Niklas (Sheet Metal Niklas; roughly "Tin Man") – A robot with extraordinary abilities.
- The Hen – A good friend of Charlie Strap who lives in a chicken coop.
- The Fox – A fox who might not always be completely trustworthy. Speaks in a slow way with random pauses for laughs.
- The Parrot – A parrot who grows tired of sitting in her cage all day and prefers to join Charlie Strap and the others.

== Filmography ==
- Kalle Stropp, Grodan Boll och deras vänner (Kalle Stropp, Grodan Boll och deras vänner) (1956) (voice)
- Kalle Stropp och Grodan Boll räddar Hönan (Kalle Stropp och Grodan Boll räddar Hönan) (1987) (voice)
- Charlie Strapp and Froggy Ball Flying High (Kalle Stropp och Grodan Boll på svindlande äventyr) (1991) (voice)
