= Kalle Stropp och Grodan Boll räddar Hönan =

- Directed by: Jan Gissberg
- Written by: Thomas Funck
- Starring: Thomas Funck
- Distributed by: Cinemation Industries; Swedish Film Institute; Sveriges Television
- Release date: 12 December 1987 (Sweden)
- Running time: 34 minutes
- Country: Sweden
- Language: Swedish

Kalle Stropp och Grodan Boll räddar Hönan is a 1987 Swedish animated short film directed by Jan Gissberg about the two eponymous characters created by Thomas Funck. Funck also provides all voices. The film was released theatrically in Sweden on 12 December 1987. It was followed in 1991 by the feature-length film Charlie Strapp and Froggy Ball Flying High, made by the same team.

== Plot ==
One day, Charlie Strapp's good friend The Chicken is kidnapped by two villains Pudding and Karlsson. Charlie Strapp, who has just been invited by Froggy Ball to get in his new car, constructed by Sheet-Niklas and himself mainly out of an old shoe and a well-shaken soda bottle, begins the chase. But the start is miserable as their other friend The Parrot also ends up being kidnapped. It turns out, though, that the kidnappers might not be purely evil after all: they work as stage magicians and just happen to need a hen for a trick they are performing. Charlie Strapp and the others continue to chase the kidnappers through air, on the ground and on water skis until the final showdown. Maybe they can find another trick.

== Cast ==
- Thomas Funck - Charlie Strapp, Froggy Ball, The Parrot (Polly The Parrot), Sheet-Niklas (Tin-Can Harry), The Fox (Phil The Fox), Pudding, Karlsson, and The Chicken
