= Anita och Televinken =

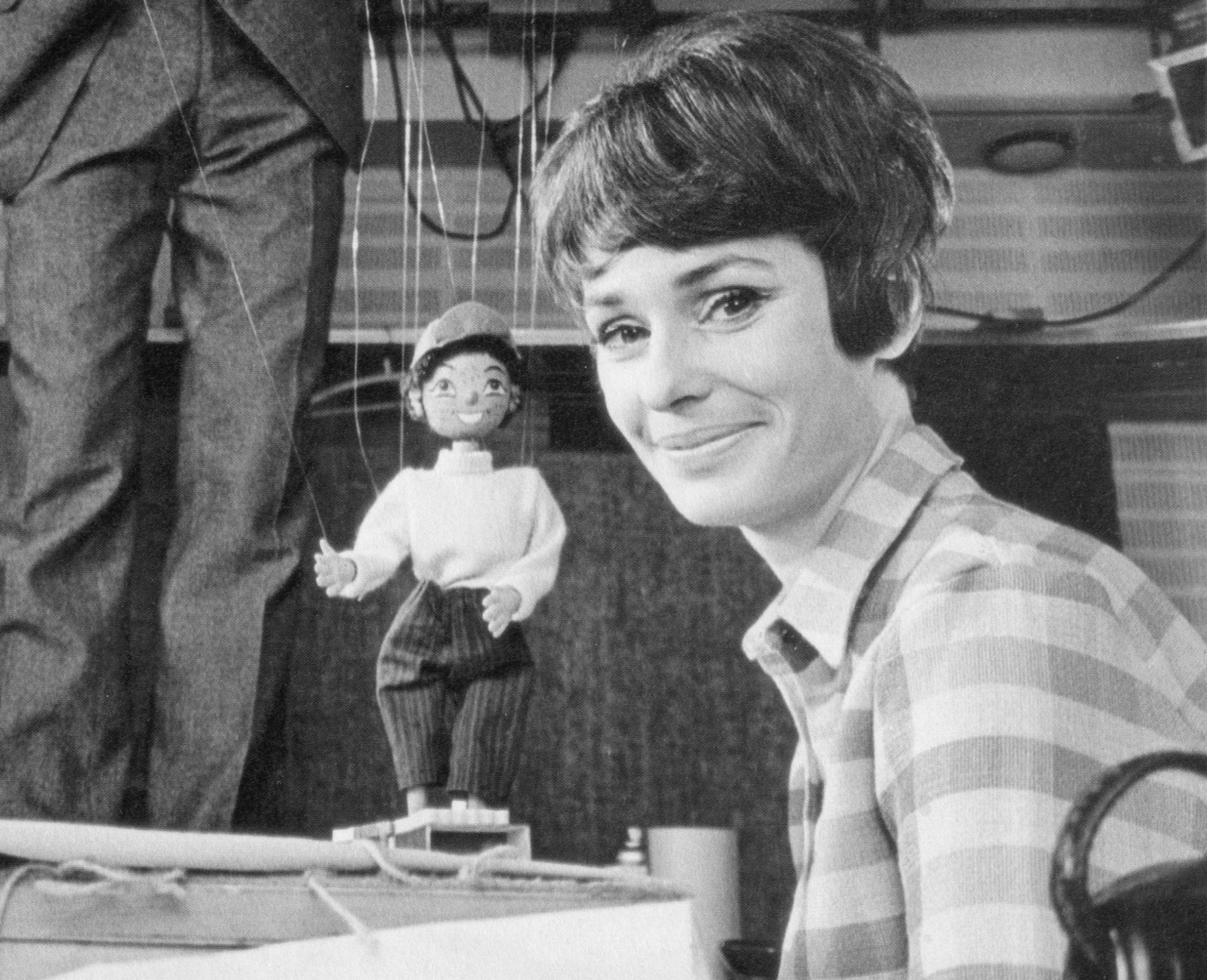
- Anita and Televinken in 1966
- Genre: children
- Starring: Anita Lindman Lamm
- Voices of: Ola Lundberg
- Country of origin: Sweden
- Original language: Swedish

Original release
- Network: SVT

Anita och Televinken was a Swedish children's programme starting at Sveriges TV in 1964. Televinken was a marionette operated and voiced by Ola Lundberg. Anita Lindman Lamm played Anita.

In 1969, cooperation with Barnens trafikklubb began. Programmes aired over Sveriges Radio. The theme was teaching children how to act when out in traffic, often with song lyrics written by Gullan Bornemark, usually re-using famous tunes. In 1974, NTF and Barnens trafikklubb released Anita & Televinkens trafikskiva.

The cancellation of the traffic-related programmes has been criticized for reducing the awareness of how to act out in traffic.

Episodes of the series were sold to Icelandic television in 1977, dubbed in Icelandic, in line with the country's move to driving on the right side of the road in 1977.
