= Martin Asphaug =

Norwegian film director and screenwriter

- Born: 28 April 1950

Martin Asphaug (born 28 April 1950) is a film director and screenwriter from Trondheim, Norway.

With a background in writing and directing short films, industry documentaries and PSAs, Asphaug made his feature film debut with the award-winning 1989 film, A Handful of Time.

Since 1992 Asphaug has primarily worked in Sweden, in several cases with SVT, directing episodes of Rederiet and the first season of Skärgårdsdoktorn. Since 2000, Asphaug has worked on several projects from author Håkan Nesser, the first films of the Van Veeteren series (adaptations of The Mind's Eye, The Return and Woman with Birthmark) and the 1962 period film Kim Novak badade aldrig i Genesarets sjö of 2005. In 2007 he directed the first two films of the Irene Huss series by Helene Tursten.

He lives near Ystad in Skåne.

== Filmography ==
Feature films:

- En Håndfull Tid (1989, A Handful of Time)
- Svampe (1990)
- Giftige løgner (1992, Toxic Lies)
- Andreaskorset (2004, The Crossing)
- Kim Novak badade aldrig i Genesarets sjö (2005, Kim Novak Never Swam in Genesaret's Lake)

TV series:

- Min vän Percys magiska gymnastikskor (1994, My Friend Percy's Magic Gym Shoes)
- Zonen (1996, The Zone)
- Skärgårdsdoktorn, episodes 1-8 (1997)
- Det Grovmaskiga Nätet (2000, The Mind's Eye)
- Återkomsten (2001, The Return)
- Kvinna med Födelsemärke (2001, Woman with Birthmark)
- Slangebæreren (2005, The Snakebearer)

Short films:

- "Stil" (1986, "Essay")
- "Hyl" (1987, "Howl")
- "Brr" (1987)
- Folk flest bor i Kina (2002: segment "SV")
