= Charlie Strapp and Froggy Ball Flying High =

- Swedish: Kalle Stropp och Grodan Boll på svindlande äventyr
- Directed by: Jan Gissberg
- Written by: Thomas Funck
- Starring: Thomas Funck; Thorsten Flinck; Peter Dalle; Claes Månsson; Åsa Bjerkerot; Eva Funck; Stig Grybe
- Music by: Thomas Funck
- Distributed by: Cinemation Industries; Swedish Film Institute; Sandrew Metronome; TV3 (Sweden)
- Release date: 14 December 1991 (Sweden)
- Running time: 83 minutes
- Country: Sweden
- Language: Swedish

Charlie Strapp and Froggy Ball Flying High (Swedish: Kalle Stropp och Grodan Boll på svindlande äventyr) is a 1991 Swedish animated feature film directed by Jan Gissberg after an original script by Thomas Funck, using Funck's already well-established characters. It follows a shorter film made by the same team in 1987, Kalle Stropp och Grodan Boll räddar Hönan. This is the first time since before 1954 where a Kalle Stropp production features voice acting by others than only Funck himself, only with the exception of children that had participated in other productions as well.

It was dubbed into English by Filmor and Cinélume in 1994 and was only released straight-to-video in Canada under the name Charlie and Froggy from Alliance Films and Australia under its original title from Rocvale Video. The majority of the characters' names were changed and four minutes of footage were removed.

== Plot ==
Something strange has been spotted over the treetops in the forest where Charlie Strapp and Froggy Ball live, and Tin-Can Harry quickly builds Binoculars to examine it. It turns out to be an emergency signal and the two friends together with Tin-Can Harry and Polly the Parrot (The Parrot) set out on an expedition to rescue whoever is sending the signal. They eventually stumbles upon the pine cone people who live there and quickly befriends King Cone, Queen Cone and Princess Cone Green, a young and impulsive female cone.

It turns out that the Cone people are the ones who have been sending the signal, and when elevated up to a tree top Charlie Strapp and Froggy Ball see a helicopter landing, with three evil businessmen from the company Tonto-Turbo who are planning to tear down a huge part of the forest. When the businessman leave, Connie ends up being with them on the helicopter. Charlie Strapp and Froggy Ball hang onto the landing skids, but eventually fall off high up in the air over a lake. Luckily, it turns out that Charlie's tailcoat can be used as a parachute, and Froggy Ball even learns how to steer it by pulling the tails, so they can land on a steam boat.

They reunite with Tin-Can Harry and Polly on the boat, which takes them to Mariefred. They manage to locate the businessmen, who are heading to Gripsholm Castle, as their full plan is to move the old castle to the cleared space in the forest and turn it into a hyper modern luxury hotel, replacing most of its walls and floors with glass. This will be made possible by hacking the authorities' computers with a special program they are keeping on a floppy disk. Connie, who has been hiding in a briefcase, tries to steal the disk but fails. Instead, she, Charlie Strapp and Froggy Ball end up on the bottom of the castle well, but are soon rescued by Tin-Can Harry.

In the meantime, the men from Tonto-Turbo leave again in their helicopter. Tin-Can Harry calculates that they are heading to Tonto-Turbos Office before he flies back to the cone forest with Cone Green. In the city, Charlie Strapp and Froggy Ball walk up to Tonto-Turbos Office and confront them, but are simply laughed at and disregarded. The businessmen then head off to the Nobel party where they have been invited. The two friends, left in the office, discover that the men forgot to bring the floppy disk with them. They try to find out which one of the disks at the office it is that is the real one, and while trying one in the computer the frog ends up inside a computer game and Charlie has to control him into safety with the joystick. Soon after that, one of the men returns and takes the right disk with him.

Unable to get into the Stockholm City Hall, Froggy Ball is ready to give up when a submarine appears. Out of it come Tin-Can Harry and Connie, who have returned. Through the kitchen, they smuggle themselves into the party by hiding in the dessert – an ice cream parade. When inside, Froggy Ball holds a speech where he accuses the men from Tonto-Turbo in public. The men try to capture the two friends, but then suddenly Phil the Fox, who had previously only been seen in a short cameo in the very beginning of the story, arrives and causes disruption. While the men are distracted, everybody can escape, and Connie steals the floppy disk. After a wild chase through, the men recapture the disk, but only to see an army of cones arrives and chase them into the water, where also the disk is dropped by The Parrot. Back in the cone forest, the frog is awarded a prize from the hands of the cone Minister of Flower Pots and the businessman are given a new profession – shaving sheep, which they seem to enjoy.

== Cast ==
| Character | Swedish | English |
|---|---|---|
| Kalle Stropp | Thomas Funck | Filmor and Cinélume (1998) |
| Kalle Stropp | Thomas Funck | Charlie Strapp |
| Kalle Stropp | Thomas Funck | Arthur Holden |
| Grodan Boll | Thomas Funck | Froggy Ball |
| Grodan Boll | Thomas Funck | Richard Dumont |
| Plåt-Niklas | Thomas Funck | Tin Can Harry |
| Plåt-Niklas | Thomas Funck | Rick Jones |
| Papegojan | Thomas Funck | Polly |
| Papegojan | Thomas Funck | Sonja Ball |
| Räven | Thomas Funck | Phil |
| Räven | Thomas Funck | Terrence Scammell |
| Kottekungen | Stig Grybe | King Cornelius |
| Kottekungen | Stig Grybe | Arthur Grosser |
| Kottedrottningen | Eva Funck | Queen Cordelia |
| Kottedrottningen | Eva Funck | Kathleen Fee |
| Kottegrön | Åsa Bjerkerot | Princess Green Cone |
| Kottegrön | Åsa Bjerkerot | Liz MacRae |
| Tonto-Turbo Executives | Thorsten Flinck | ¿? |
| Tonto-Turbo Executives | Peter Dalle | ¿? |
| Tonto-Turbo Executives | Claes Månsson | ¿? |

== Production ==
In the early 1980s, Charlie Strapp and Froggy Ball were frequently featured in various Swedish radio series during the summers. When listening to one of these Jan Gissberg got the idea of making an animated film about them and contacted Thomas Funck. Together they discussed the desirable appearances of the characters and settings. The project was to be produced by Gissberg's own recently started animation studio, Cinemation Industries, where also his brother Peter Gissberg worked as a background artist. Around Christmas 1987 a short film was released, but already a year prior to that, they had begun working on a script for a feature-length film. In 1987 they started the process of making it, using a budget of 13 million SEK.

== Reception ==
The general Swedish reception was positive, with more or less a critical consensus claiming that it stood out as the winner among the films competing over a similar target audience, being released around the same time as Rock-A-Doodle, The Rescuers Down Under and An American Tail: Fievel Goes West. The playful style and rich ideas were complimented, and the poetic background art by Peter Gissberg was particularly praised.

Dagens Nyheter claimed that although it might lack the virtuosity of Disney's films, it is to its credit that it also lacks their sentimentality and delight for violence. They also commented that the film is "pretty sophisticated" due to its sportively drawn characters appearing against a backdrop of aquarelle soft nature poetry.

=== Awards ===
- Director Jan Gissberg received a Guldbagge Award for Best Creative Achievement 1992
- Honorary Award in the section for children's and youth films at the Cannes Film Festival 1992
