= Anita Lindman =

Swedish television announcer and producer

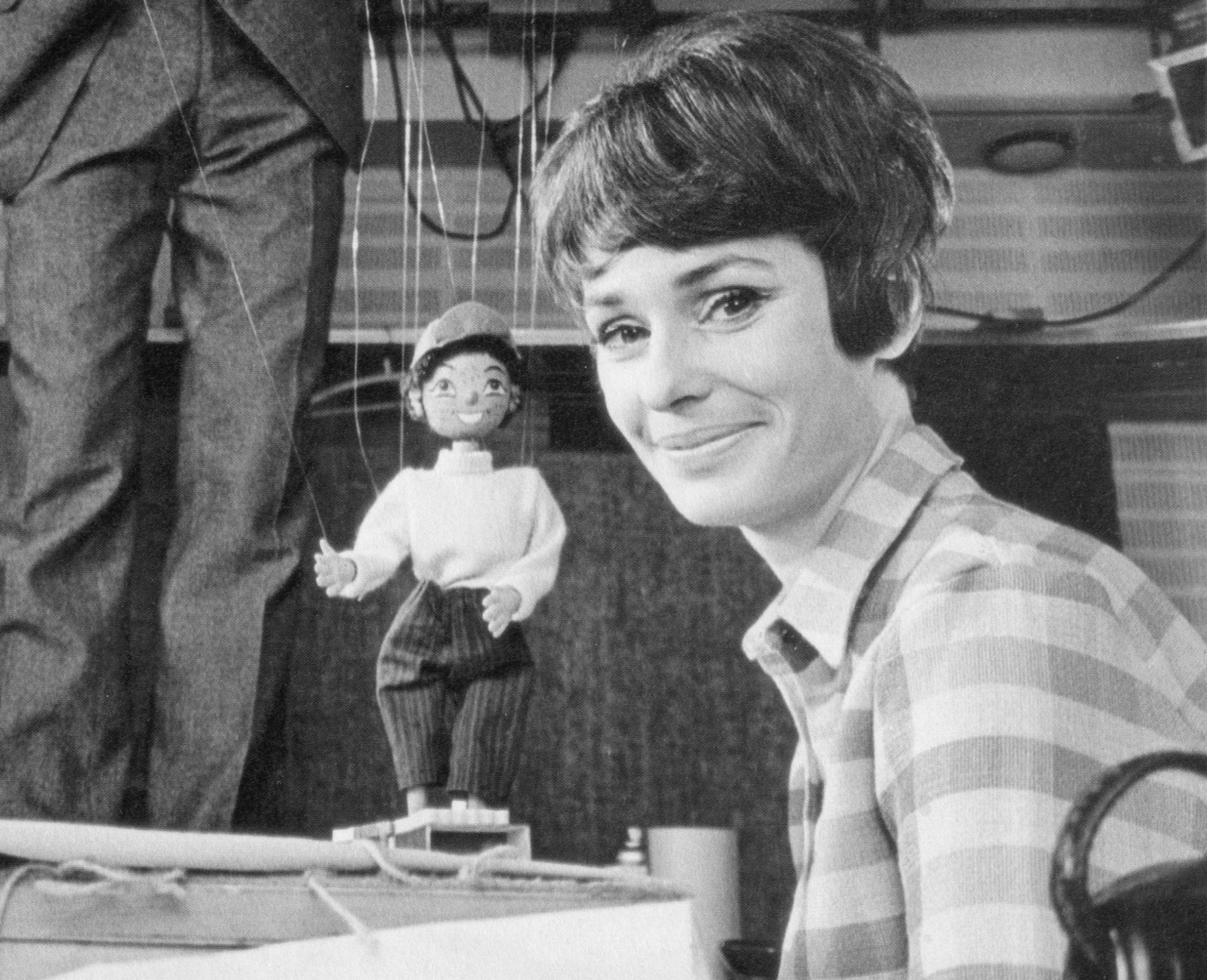
- Anita Lindman at Anita och Televinken in 1966
- Born: Anita Lamm; 14 May 1932; Ludvika, Sweden
- Died: 31 August 2018 (aged 86); Norrtälje, Sweden
- Occupations: television announcer and producer
- Notable work: Anita och Televinken
- Parent: Uno Lamm

Anita Lindman (née Lamm; 14 May 1932 – 31 August 2018) was a Swedish television announcer and producer. She was particularly known for the children's programme Anita och Televinken, a puppet show television series. She was a daughter of Uno Lamm and Ingalill Beckman. Lindman died in Norrtälje in 2018, 86 years old.

== Selected filmography ==
- Hur Marie träffade Fredrik, åsnan Rebus, kängurun Ploj och...
