= Klappkampen =

- Genre: children
- Country of origin: Sweden
- Language(s): Swedish
- Home station: SR P3, SR P4
- Starring: Måns Nilsson, Sandra Hult, Anders Johansson, Åsa Ahlander, Kalle Lind
- Written by: Måns Lilsson Kalle Lindh
- Directed by: Kalle Lindh
- Produced by: Maria Thörnqvist
- Original release: 1 December – 24 December 2008
- No. of episodes: 24

Klappkampen (The Christmas-Present Struggle) was the 2008 edition of Sveriges Radio's Christmas Calendar. The characters are the same as in Skägget i brevlådan, the 2008 Sveriges Television's Christmas calendar, but with a different story.

== Plot ==
Three friends, Klas, Lage and Renée live in a flat where Renée has a workshop for inventions. When Christmas approaches, Klas is asked by his brother Lage to buy a Christmas present for their mother. Having no money, he instead asks his sister Renée to build some inventions.
