= Toivos kosmos =

- Genre: children, science fiction
- Country of origin: Sweden
- Language(s): Swedish
- Home station: SR P3, SR P4
- Written by: Niclas Pajala
- Narrated by: Frida Sjöberg, Maria Lundqvist, David Viklund, Markoolio, Sven Wollter
- Original release: 1 December – 24 December 2006
- No. of episodes: 24

Toivos kosmos ("Toivo's Cosmos") was the 2006 edition of Sveriges Radio's Christmas Calendar.

== Plot ==
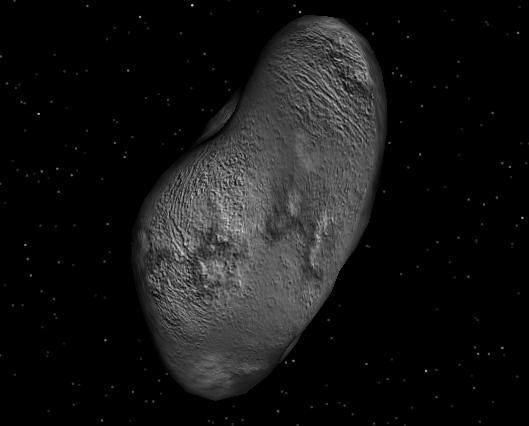
Jupiter's moon Himalia, where Santa Claus and Lucy have settled in the story.

Santa Claus and Lucy have left Earth, moving to Jupiter's moon Himalia, having gotten tired of life on Earth where everything is focused on money and having many things. However, Santa Claus learns that queen Hesperia has come to power on Pello. Toivo, a troll from planet Pello, has escaped from Himalia and is now on Earth where she is assisted by the children Kim and Lovikka to stop Hesperia.
