= Samma gamla visa =

- Genre: children
- Country of origin: Sweden
- Language(s): Swedish
- Home station: SR P3, SR P4
- Starring: Kajsa Paulsson, Sven-Åke Gustavsson, Yvonne Lombard
- Written by: Mats Kjelbye, Anna Charlotta Gunnarson
- Produced by: Inga Rexed
- Original release: 1 December – 24 December 2003
- No. of episodes: 24

Samma gamla visa ("The Same Old Tune") was the 2003 edition of Sveriges Radio's Christmas Calendar.

== Plot ==
At school, 11 years old Amanda Axelsson has to learn the old tune "Ack snö, ack snö" by heart. She also learns it backwards and strange, magical, things begin to happen.
