= Hjärtats hjältar =

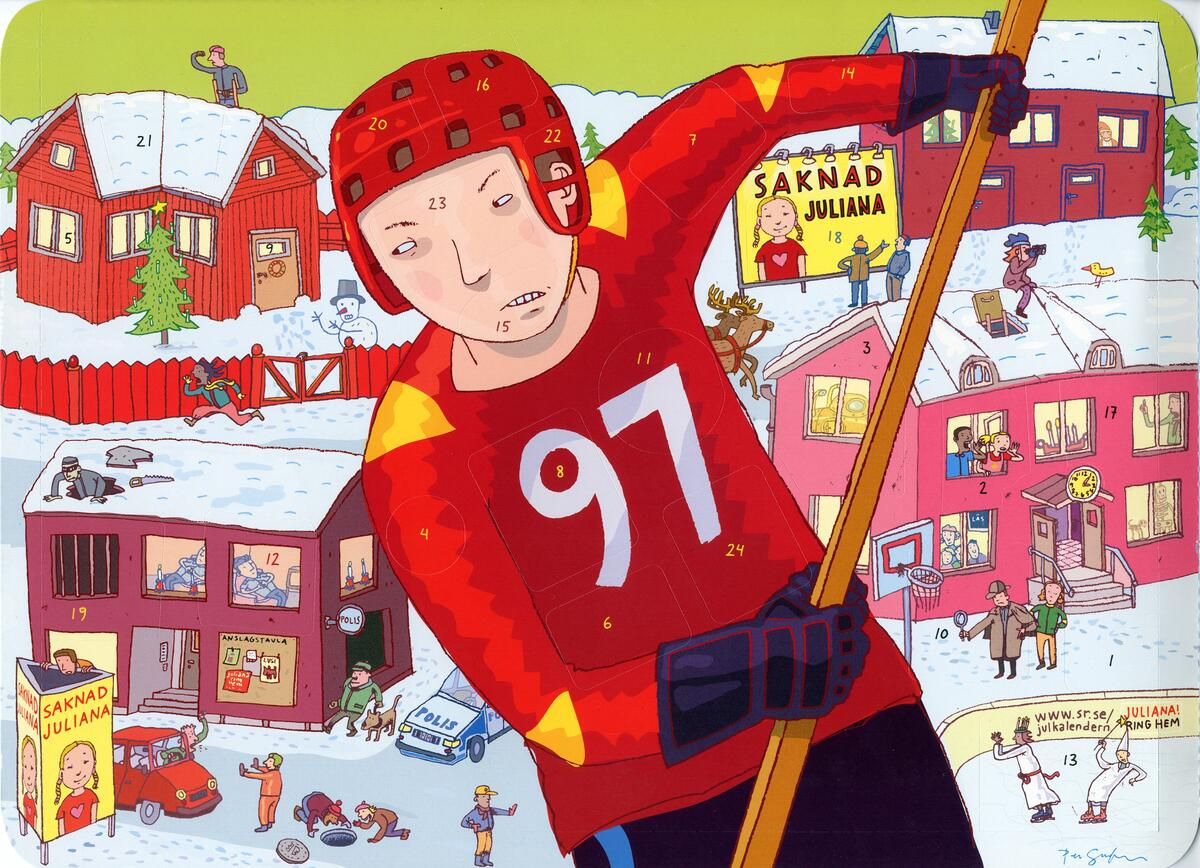
- Genre: children
- Country of origin: Sweden
- Language(s): Swedish
- Home station: SR P3, SR P4
- Starring: Matilda Kittel, Theo Randquist, Sussi Lindberg, Jakob Isberg, Annika Lantz, Staffan Dopping, Carl-Johan Svensson, Peter Örn
- Written by: Geirr Lystrup
- Produced by: Jesper Tillberg, Andreas Palmaer
- Original release: 1 December – 24 December 2004
- No. of episodes: 24

Hjärtats hjältar ("The Heroes of the Heart") was the 2004 edition of Sveriges Radio's Christmas Calendar.

== Plot ==
Julius and Juliana are twins. Julius wants to become a better ice hockey player. He practices a lot, not even caring for Christmas. Worried, Juliana visits the school nurse Vera, who says practicing to hard is dangerous. Vera has invented a shrinking machine, which she shows Juliana. Juliana is shrunk down and enters Julius' body travelling inside small a yellow, submarine-like vehicle.
