= Bland tomtar och troll (radio programme) =

- Genre: children
- Country of origin: Sweden
- Language(s): Swedish
- Home station: SR P1, SR P2, SR P3
- Narrated by: Olof Buckard
- Original release: 1 December – 24 December 1986
- No. of episodes: 24

Bland tomtar och troll (Among Gnomes and Trolls) was the 1986 edition of Sveriges Radio's Christmas Calendar.

== Plot ==
Olof Buckard reads fairy tales from the Swedish fairy tale anthology Among Gnomes and Trolls.

== Cassette tapes ==
In 1987, it was also released to cassette tape, as an audiobook.
