= Hertig Hans slott =

- Genre: children
- Country of origin: Sweden
- Language: Swedish
- Home station: SR P3
- Written by: Anders Lundin, Lars in de Betou, Magdalena Johannesson, Gunvor Pontén
- Directed by: Erland von Heijne, Lars in de Betou, Anders Lundin
- Produced by: Erland von Heijne, Lars in de Betou, Anders Lundin
- Original release: 1 December – 24 December 1994
- No. of episodes: 24

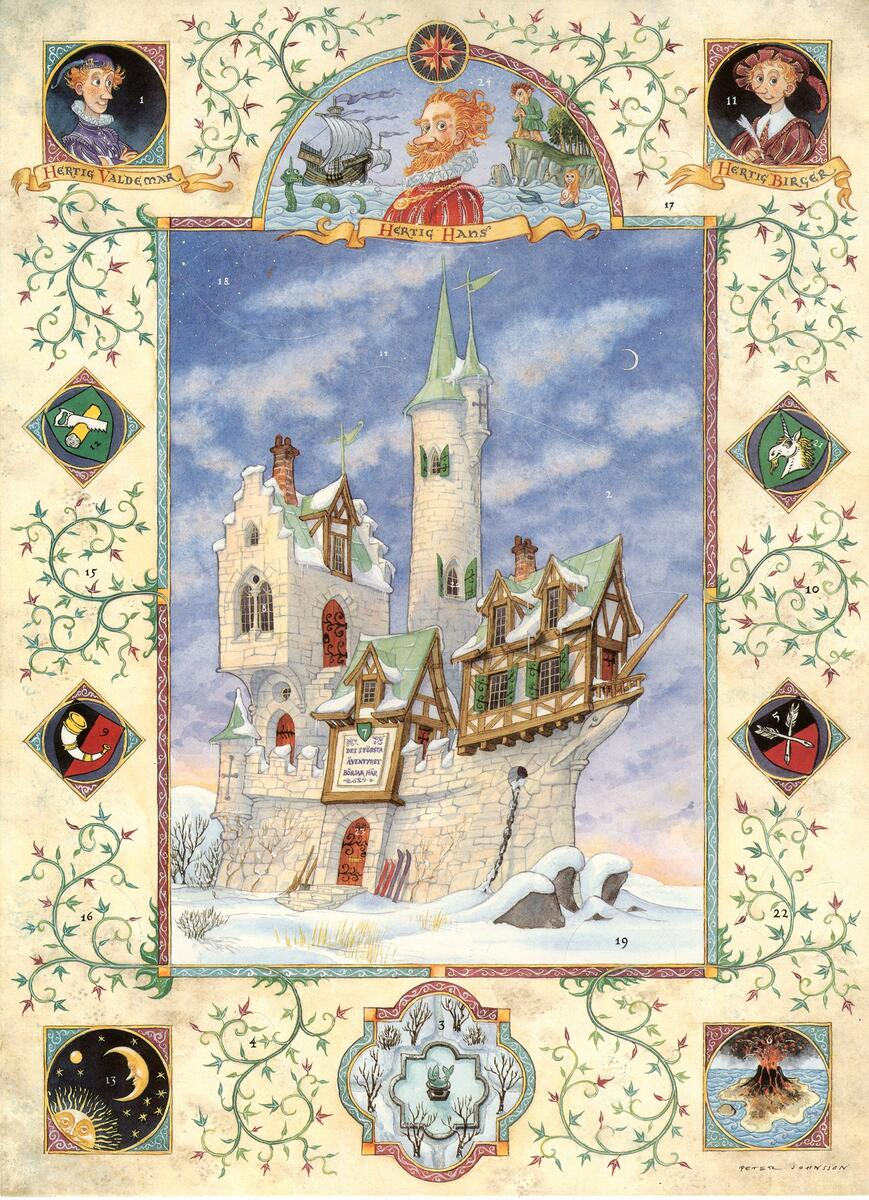
Duke Hans's Castle paper calendar from 1994 depicting the Duke's Castle with a frame with portraits and other pictures in it.

Hertig Hans slott ("Duke Hans' Castle") was the 1994 edition of Sveriges Radio's Christmas Calendar.

== Plot ==
Duke Hans' castle is located on a rocky island out at sea. Construction was led by Duke Hans a long time ago. One day, his two descentendts Birger and Valdemar begin exploring the castle.

== Rerun ==
The series was aired as a rerun between 4 February-7 March 1997.
