= Ett skepp kommer lastat =

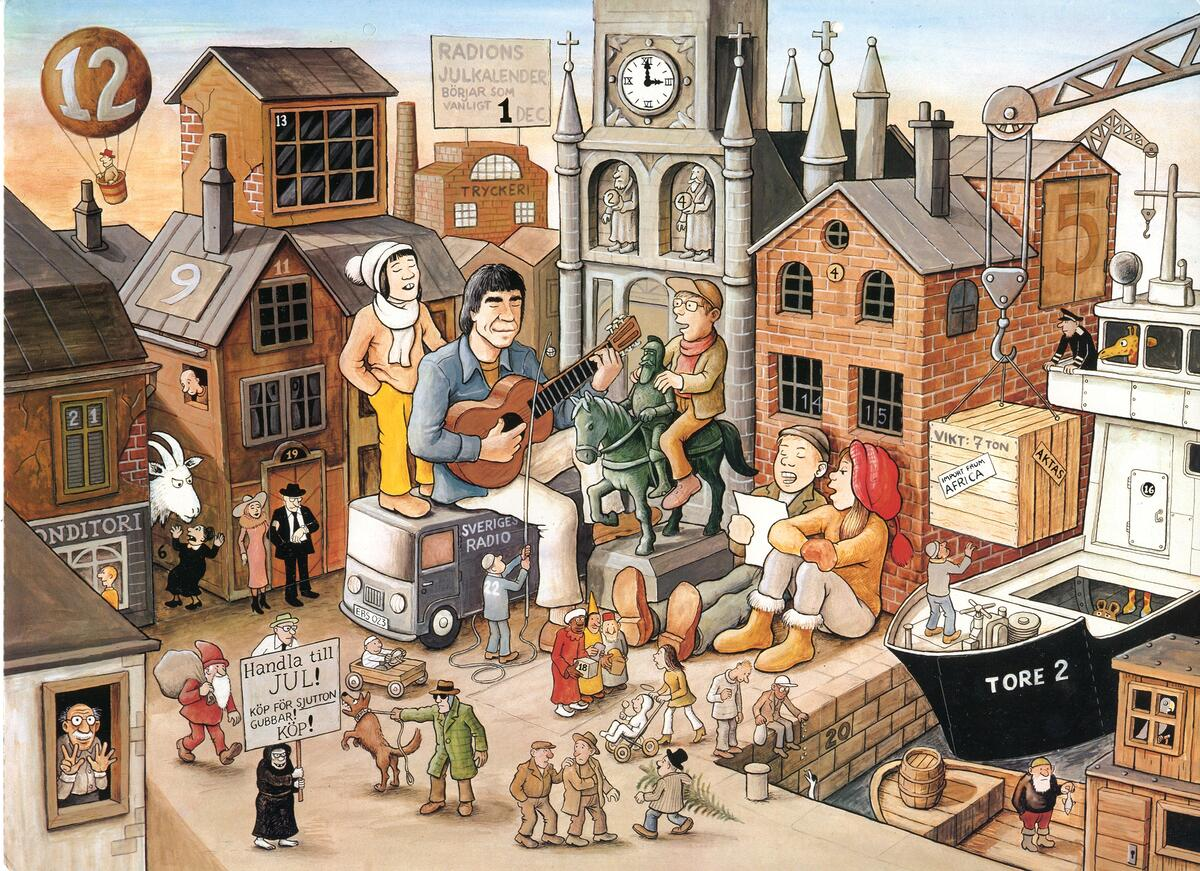
- A ship arrives loaded with paper calendars from 1982
- Genre: children
- Country of origin: Sweden
- Language(s): Swedish
- Home station: SR P3
- Starring: Martin Skogmar, Rose Marie Andersson
- Written by: Gunnar Bernstrup
- Produced by: Gunnar Bernstrup
- Original release: 1 December – 24 December 1982
- No. of episodes: 24

Ett skepp kommer lastat ("A Ship Arrives Loaded", also the name of a Swedish children's game) was the 1982 edition of Sveriges Radio's Christmas Calendar.

== Plot ==
Together with singer and songwriter Finn Zetterholm, a group of first-graders from the Kungsätra School in Skärholmen sing songs. When opening a calendar window, they talk about the calendar window images. On Christmas Eve, Finn and the children celebrate with most of the characters from the calendar in the square, and Dracula has a toothache.
