= Grod jul på Näsbrännan =

- Genre: children
- Country of origin: Sweden
- Language: Swedish
- Home station: SR P3
- Written by: Katarina Mazetti
- Directed by: Katarina Mazetti
- Original release: 1 December – 24 December 1993
- No. of episodes: 24

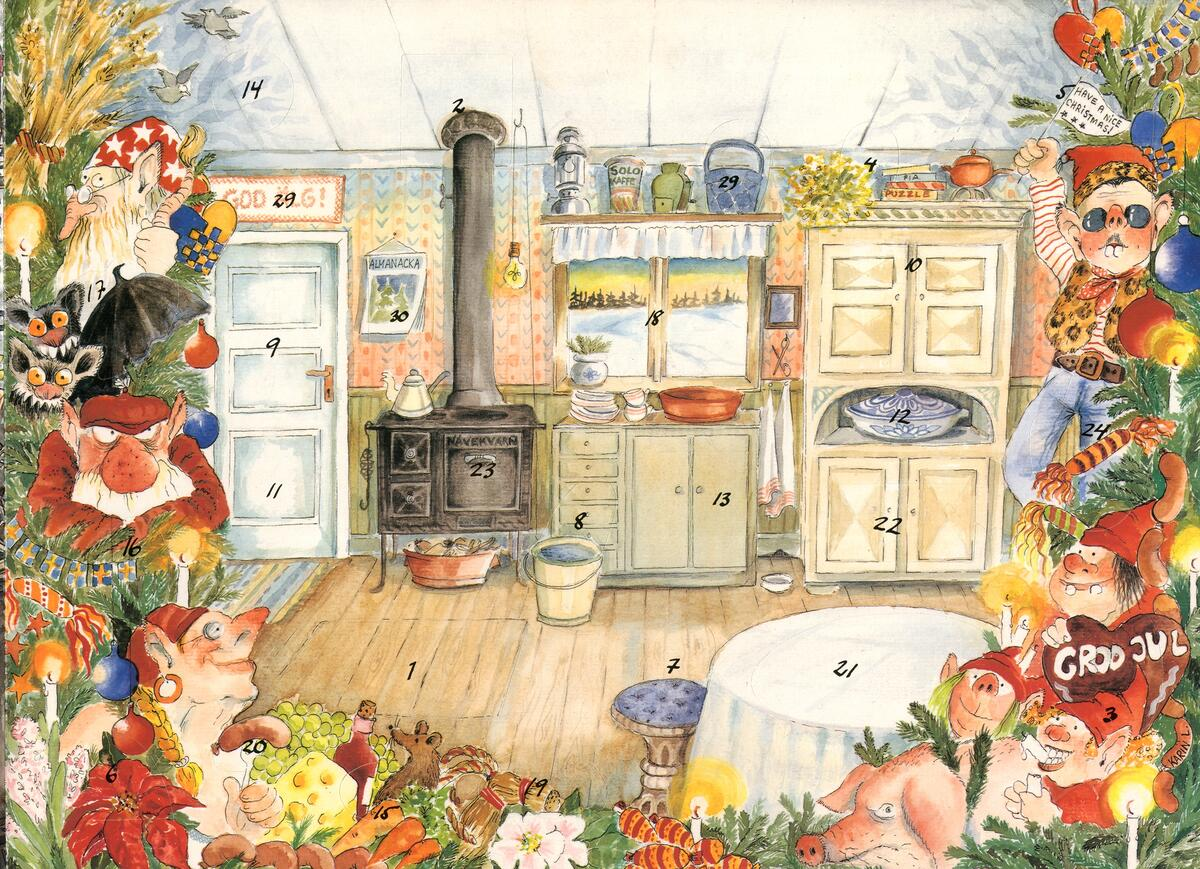
Calendar depiction of Grod jul på Näsbrännan

Grod jul på Näsbrännan ("Froggy Christmas at Näsbrännan") was the 1993 edition of Sveriges Radio's Christmas Calendar. It was also released as a book in 1993.

== Plot ==
Näsbränna farm in Nästäppa Parish is deserted since the child of the last farmer living there self became adult, moving into town. But there are still "tomtar" living there.

== Audiobook ==
Writer Katarina Mazetti also recorded the story as an audiobook, releasing it to CD in 2005.
