= Skor-Sten i den tidlösa tiden =

- Genre: children
- Country of origin: Sweden
- Language(s): Swedish
- Home station: SR P3
- Starring: Mats Wellander. Charlotte Lauterbach
- Written by: Anders Jacobsson and Sören Olsson
- Produced by: Maud Nylin
- Original release: 1 December – 24 December 1987
- No. of episodes: 24

Skor-Sten i den tidlösa tiden ("Shoe-Sten in the Timeless Time") was the 1987 edition of Sveriges Radio's Christmas Calendar.

== Plot ==
It's the day before Christmas Eve. Sten wants to know what he will get for Christmas. He has invented a time machine which he thinks will take him to 23 February the upcoming year. But instead, he ends up in a series of adventures across time and space.
