= Snälla Py =

- Genre: children
- Country of origin: Sweden
- Language(s): Swedish
- Home station: SR P3
- Starring: Maria Nyberg, Sandra Strandberg, Göran Forsmark, Maria Lundkvist, Gunilla Röör, Hasse Alatal, Staffan Westerberg, Anders Glenmark, Louise Hoffsten
- Produced by: Ingela Lekfalk
- Original release: 1 December – 24 December 2000
- No. of episodes: 24

Snälla Py ("Kind/Nice Py") was the 2000 edition of Sveriges Radio's Christmas Calendar.

== Plot ==
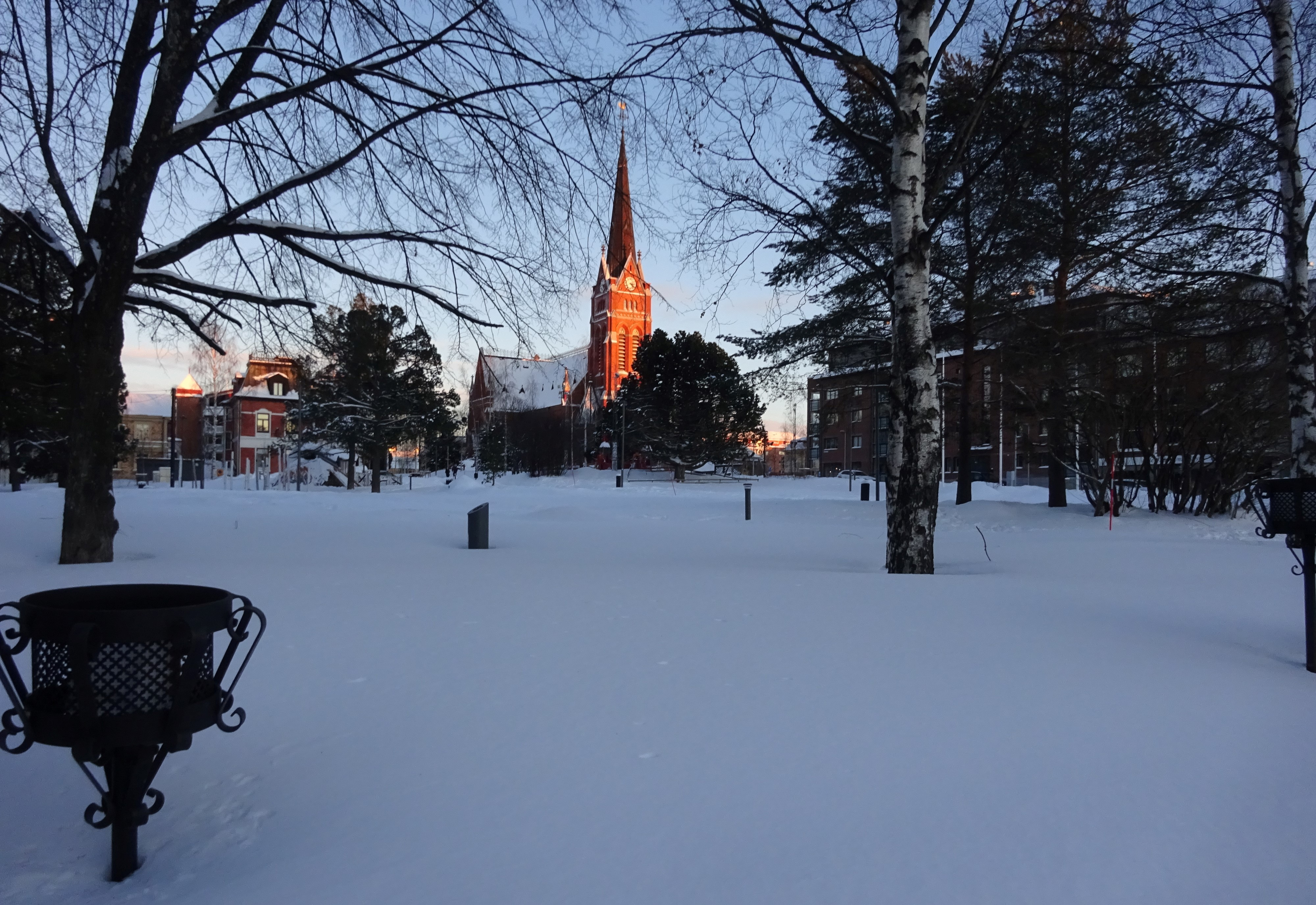
Luleå, where Py lives.

The series is a musical-based story, set in the town of Luleå in Sweden. The main character is a girl named "Py". A recurring theme is the question of what it means to be a kind person.

== CD ==
The series was released to CD the same year by the Caprice label.
