= Pricken Jansson knackar på =

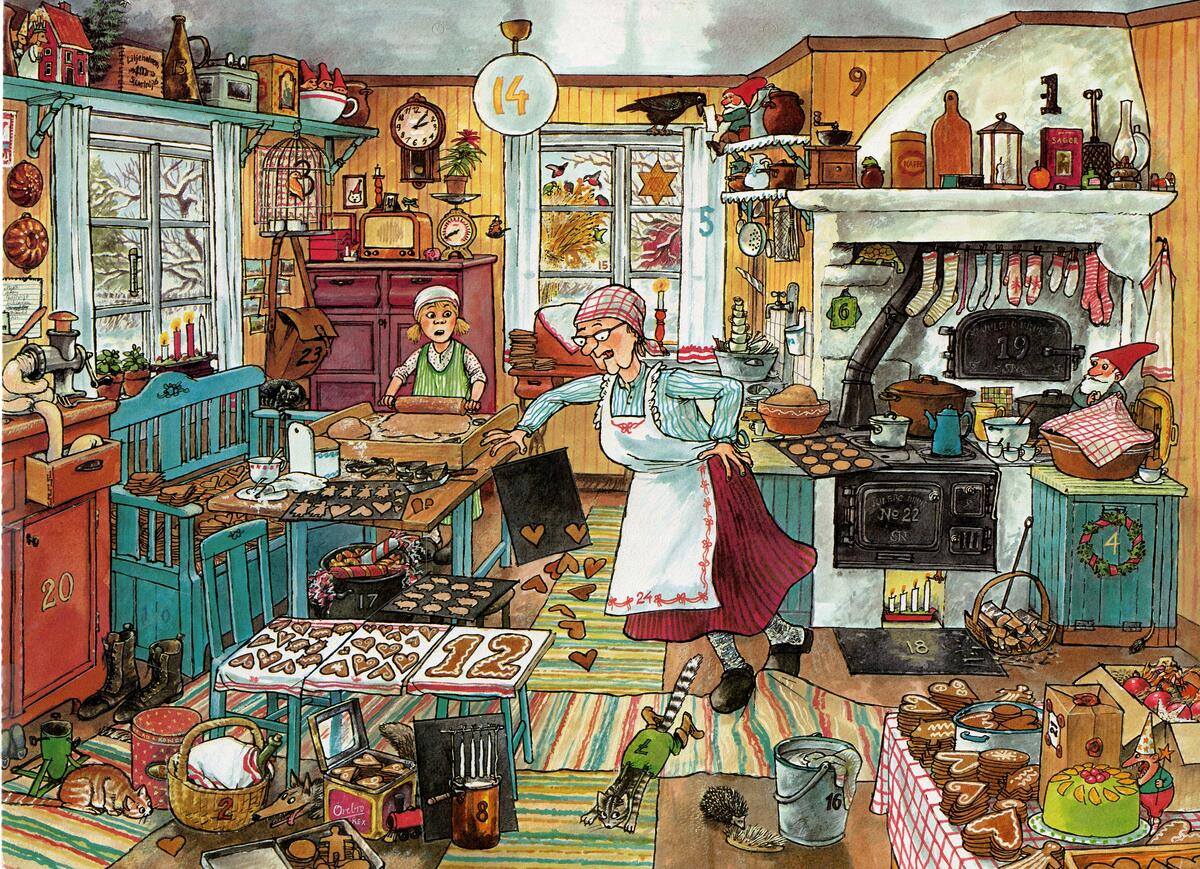
- Genre: children
- Country of origin: Sweden
- Language: Swedish
- Home station: SR P3
- Starring: Birgitta Valberg, Anna Borg
- Original release: 1 December – 24 December 1983
- No. of episodes: 24

Pricken Jansson knackar på (Pricken Jansson Knocks on the Door) was the 1983 edition of Sveriges Radio's Christmas Calendar.

== Plot ==
A girl named Pricken Jansson visits an old woman every day, to listen to the woman telling stories.

== Cassette tapes ==
The stories were also released on cassette tape the same year, read by Birgitta Valberg.
