= Siri och ishavspiraterna =

- Genre: children
- Country of origin: Sweden
- Language: Swedish
- Home station: SR P4
- Created by: Frida Nilsson
- Produced by: Inga Rexed
- Original release: 1 December – 24 December 2012
- No. of episodes: 24

Siri och ishavspiraterna was the 2012 edition of Sveriges Radio's Christmas Calendar.

== Plot ==
The Arctic Sea, where the story takes place.

When Siri's sister is kidnapped by pirate Vithuvud, Siri decides to do what no grown-up dares: follow the pirates to the Arctic island where the pirates hide.

== Episodes ==
1. Systrar i Blåvik
2. Plocka snöbär
3. Miki är borta
4. Siri på Polstjärnan
5. Fredrik berättar en hemlighet
6. Otto lurar Siri
7. Akterseglad på Vargön
8. Hos Skogsnanny
9. Vitvargar och sjöjungfrur
10. Att tjuvlyssna på tjuvar
11. Fripassagerare på Bleckfisken
12. En ny kamrat
13. Musslor, morsor och mod
14. Raskar över isen
15. Ett kärt återseende
16. Framme på den gömda ön
17. Fast i fällan
18. I gruvan
19. Siri möter Vithuvud
20. Vithuvuds plan
21. Svart, rött och vitt
22. Vithuvuds fall
23. Återseende och avfärd
24. Ett hoppets skepp
