= Jakten på julen =

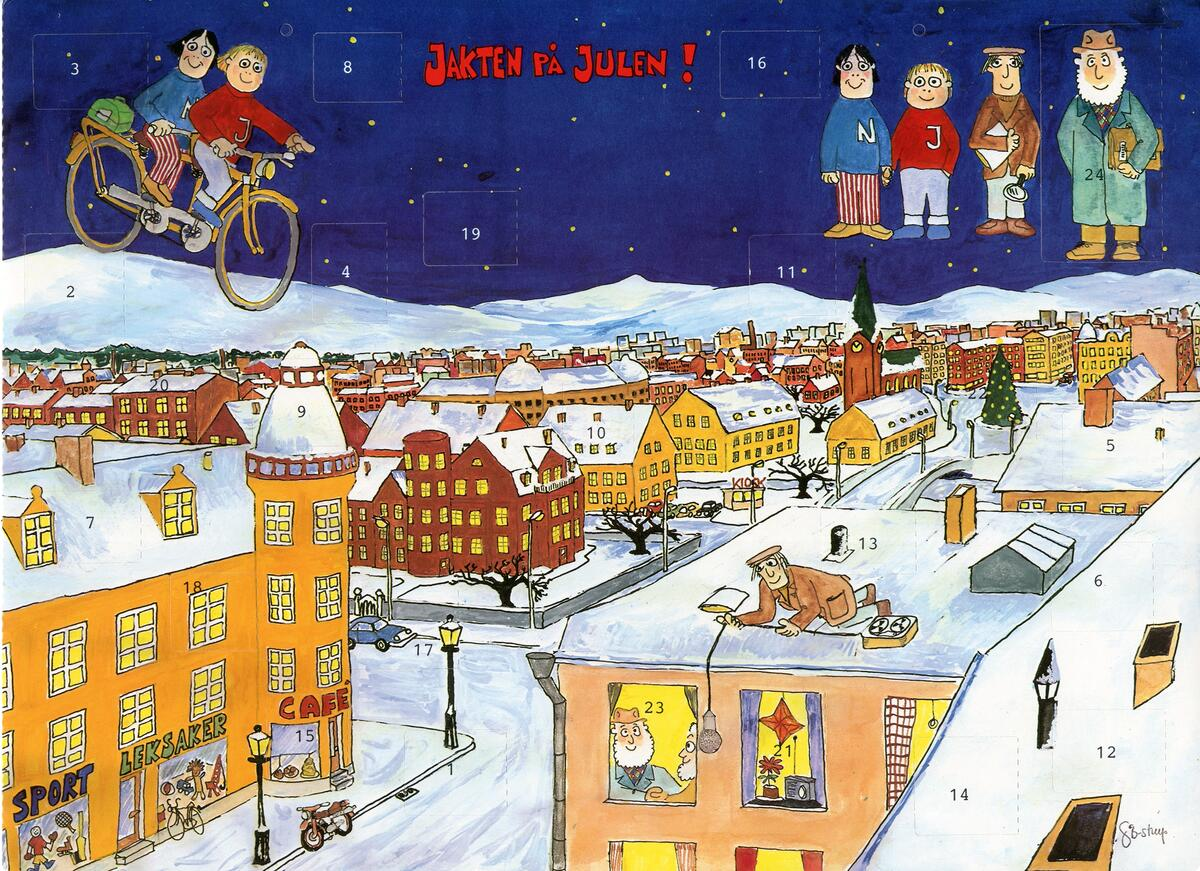
- Genre: children
- Country of origin: Sweden
- Language(s): Swedish
- Home station: SR P3
- Starring: Martin Skogmar, Rose Marie Andersson
- Written by: Gunnar Bernstrup
- Produced by: Gunnar Bernstrup
- Original release: 1 December – 24 December 1981
- No. of episodes: 24

Jakten på julen (The Hunt for Christmas) was the 1981 edition of Sveriges Radio's Christmas Calendar.

== Plot ==
Jacob and Nina's adventures as they travel to various places in Norway and Sweden on a magical, flying tandem bicycle that they've found in the attic of their grandfather's house.
