= Kulänglarna =

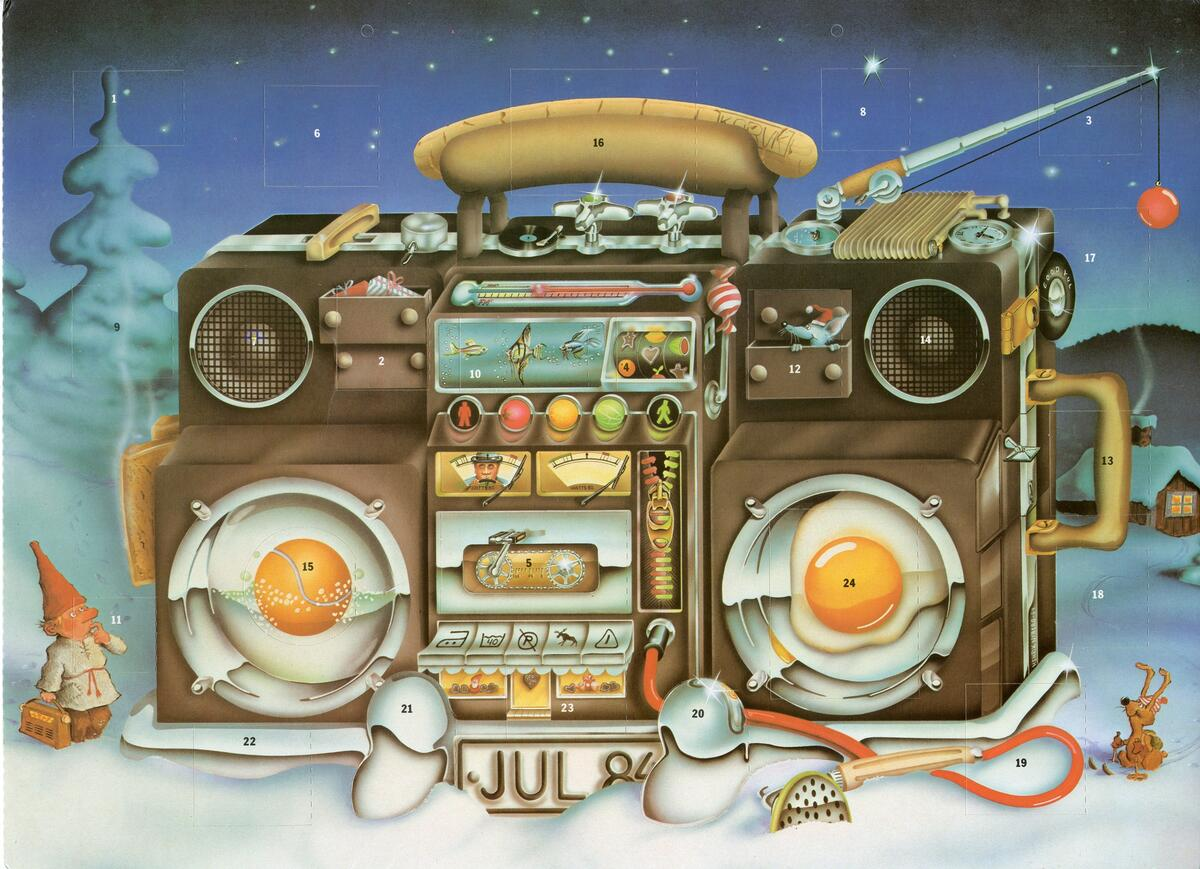
- Genre: children
- Country of origin: Sweden
- Language: Swedish
- Home station: SR P2, SR P3
- Starring: Klasse Möllberg, Pernilla Wahlgren, Anders Berglund
- Written by: Staffan Götestam
- Directed by: Staffan Götestam
- Produced by: Staffan Götestam
- Original release: 1 December – 24 December 1984
- No. of episodes: 24

Kulänglarna ("The Bauble/Funny Angles") was the 1984 edition of Sveriges Radio's Christmas Calendar.

== Plot ==
Julle runs a radio station with grammophone-rat Snurre Plätt and musical Japanese Mrl Jingle inside a red cottage. Flying angel-reporter Helge is out asking experts questions about various topics.

== Music ==
In 1984, Anders Berglund released music from the programme to LP and cassette on the Mariann label.
