= Allt du önskar =

- Genre: children
- Country of origin: Sweden
- Language(s): Swedish
- Home station: SR P4
- Written by: Sara Kadefors
- Directed by: Sara Kadefors
- Original release: 1 December – 24 December 2011
- No. of episodes: 24

Allt du önskar ("Everything You Wish") was the 2011 edition of Sveriges Radio's Christmas Calendar.

== Plot ==
11 year old girl Elvira moves into the Lancelot family some weeks before Christmas. There, she get what she wants, but soon learns that something isn't alright.
