= Kråkan och Mamma Mu =

- Genre: children
- Country of origin: Sweden
- Language: Swedish
- Home station: SR P3
- Starring: Anders Ågren
- Original release: 1 December – 24 December 1990
- No. of episodes: 24

Kråkan och Mamma Mu ("The Crow and Mama Moo") was the 1990 edition of Sveriges Radio's Christmas Calendar.

== Plot ==
The cow Mama Moo lives inside the farmer's barn, not far away from the crow ("Kråkan"). They meet every day and are close friends, despite being different.
