= Alla barnen firar jul =

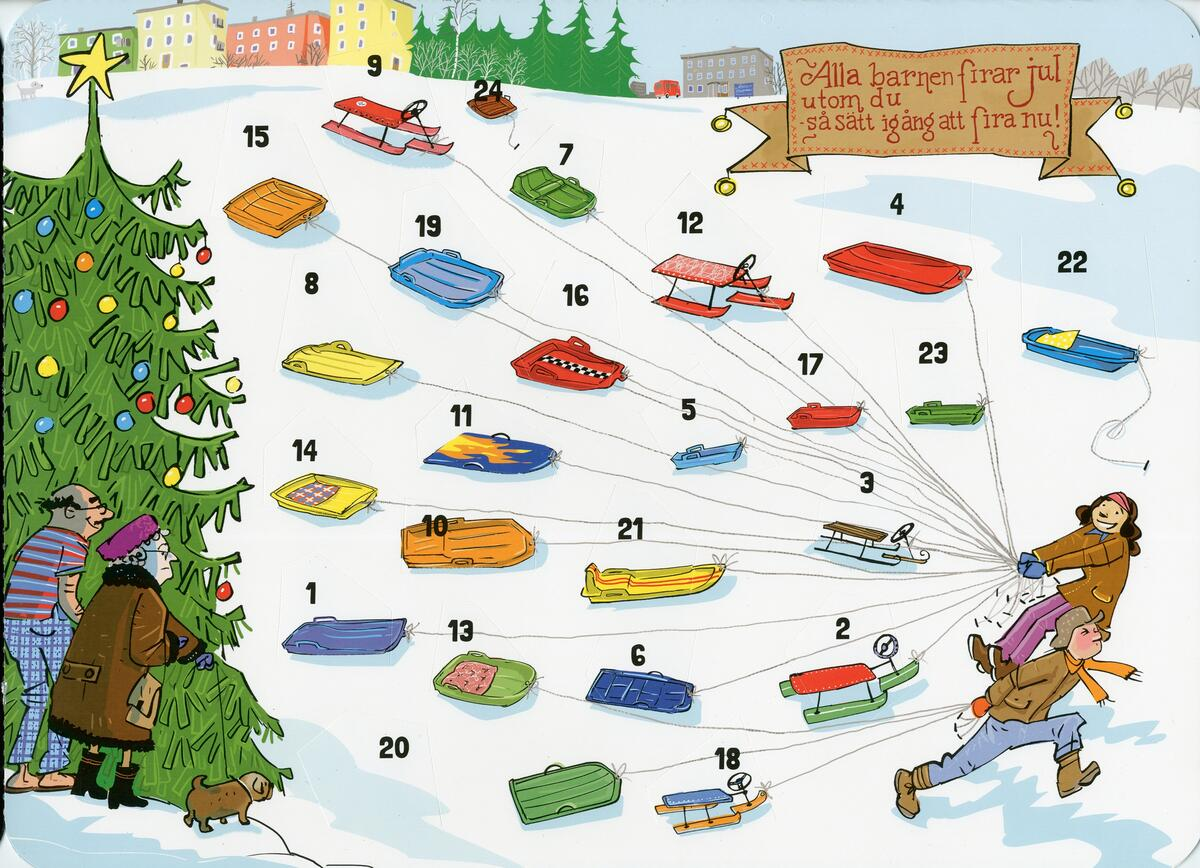
- Alla barnen firar jul
- Genre: Children
- Country of origin: Sweden
- Language(s): Swedish
- Home station: SR P4
- Created by: Måns Gahrton, Johan Unenge
- Written by: Måns Gahrton, Johan Unenge
- Produced by: Fredrik Olsson
- Original release: 1 December – 24 December 2013
- No. of episodes: 24

Alla barnen firar jul (All the Children Celebrate Christmas) was the 2013 edition of Sveriges Radio's Christmas Calendar. It was written and created by Måns Gahrton and Johan Unenge.

== Plot ==
The Svennesson family lives in a flat in Sweden and have 23 children. It's December, and Christmas is approaching.
