= Bråkar och Johanna =

- Genre: children
- Country of origin: Sweden
- Language(s): Swedish
- Home station: SR P3
- Starring: Lisa Wedin, Harry Nyman
- Written by: Geirr Lystrup
- Produced by: Ingela Lekfalk
- Original release: 1 December – 24 December 1996
- No. of episodes: 24

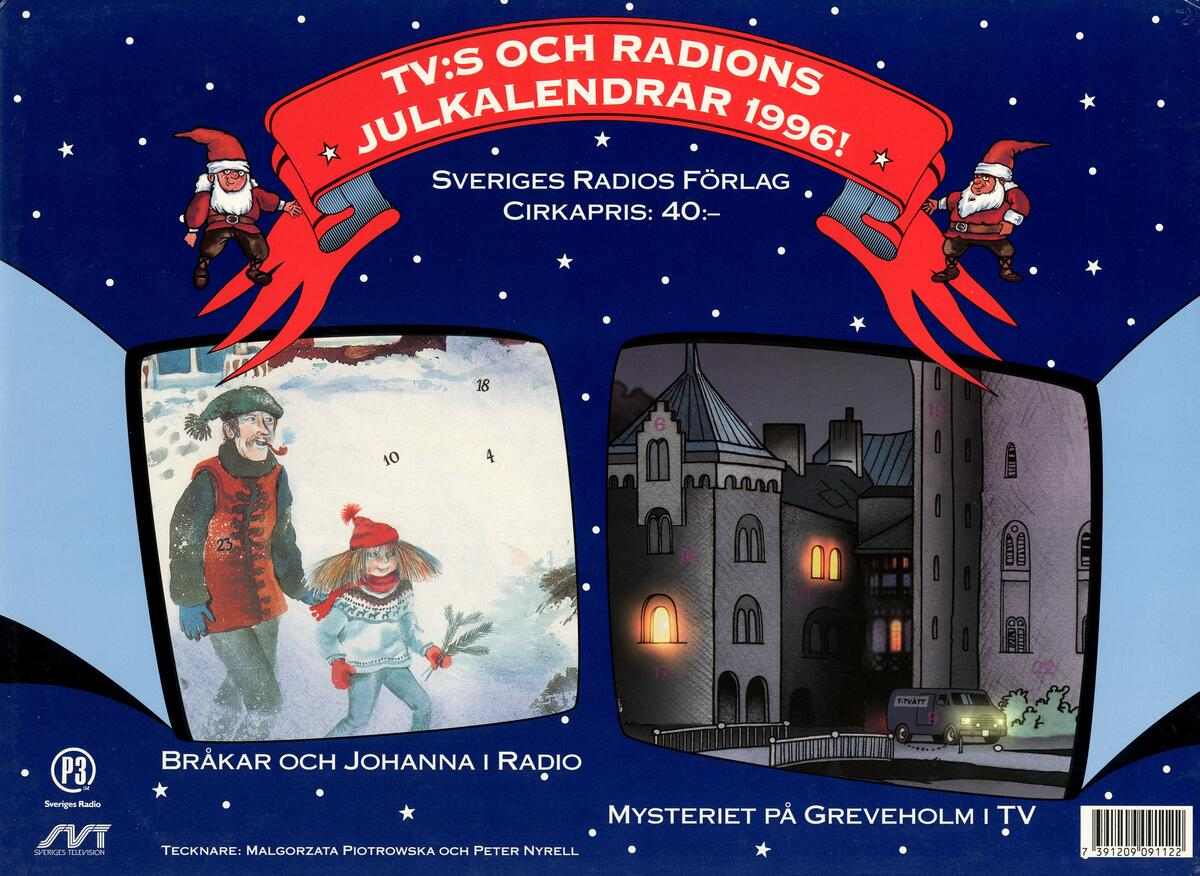
TV and radio's Christmas calendar 1996 front page, “Mysteriet på Greveholm and Brawls and Johanna”

Bråkar och Johanna ("Bråkar and Johanna") was the 1996 edition of Sveriges Radio's Christmas Calendar.

== Plot ==
Johanna is out in the forest with her grandfather on her mother's side, when Johanna falls into a hibernation hole, waking up a sleeping bear.
