= Bäjkån och Bällman =

- Genre: Children
- Country of origin: Sweden
- Language(s): Swedish
- Home station: SR P3
- Original release: 1 December – 24 December 1991
- No. of episodes: 24

Bäjkån och Bällman was the 1991 edition of Sveriges Radio's Christmas Calendar.

== Plot ==
Peacock Bällman grows up among chickens who try to tease him.

== CD and cassette tape ==
The same year, it was also released to CD and cassette tape by the Silence label.
