= Hotell Pepparkaka =

- Genre: children
- Country of origin: Sweden
- Language: Swedish
- Home station: SR P3
- Starring: Jan Nygren, Gunvor Pontén, Jessika Zandén, Pontus Gustafsson, Magdalena Johannesson, Fredrik Myrberg, Johan Ulveson, Pia Johansson
- Directed by: Hans Ernback
- Produced by: Moa Hanning
- Original release: 1 December – 24 December 1995
- No. of episodes: 24

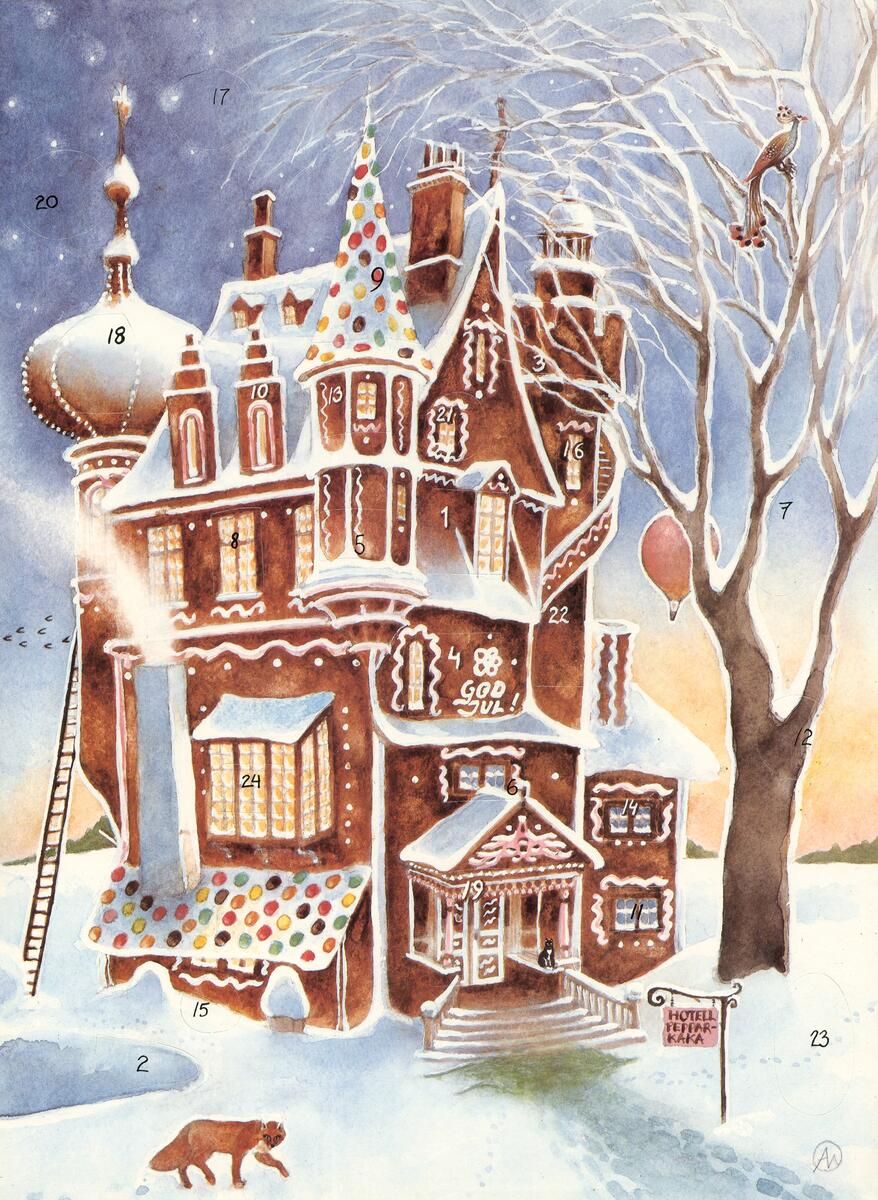

Hotell Pepparkaka (Hotel Gingerbread) was the 1995 edition of Sveriges Radio's Christmas Calendar.

== Plot ==
Out in the fairy tale-forest stands Hotel Gingerbread, made out of gingerbread and icing. Twenty-four rooms are available for rent, and each room contains a fairytale secret. The hotel's proprietors are Hansel and Gretel.
