= Beatrice (radio programme) =

- Genre: children
- Country of origin: Sweden
- Language: Swedish
- Home station: SR P3
- Starring: Jonas Svensson, Maria Mansfeld, Kenneth Milldoff
- Written by: Ulf Nilsson
- Directed by: Sten Lundström
- Original release: 1 December – 24 December 1989
- No. of episodes: 24

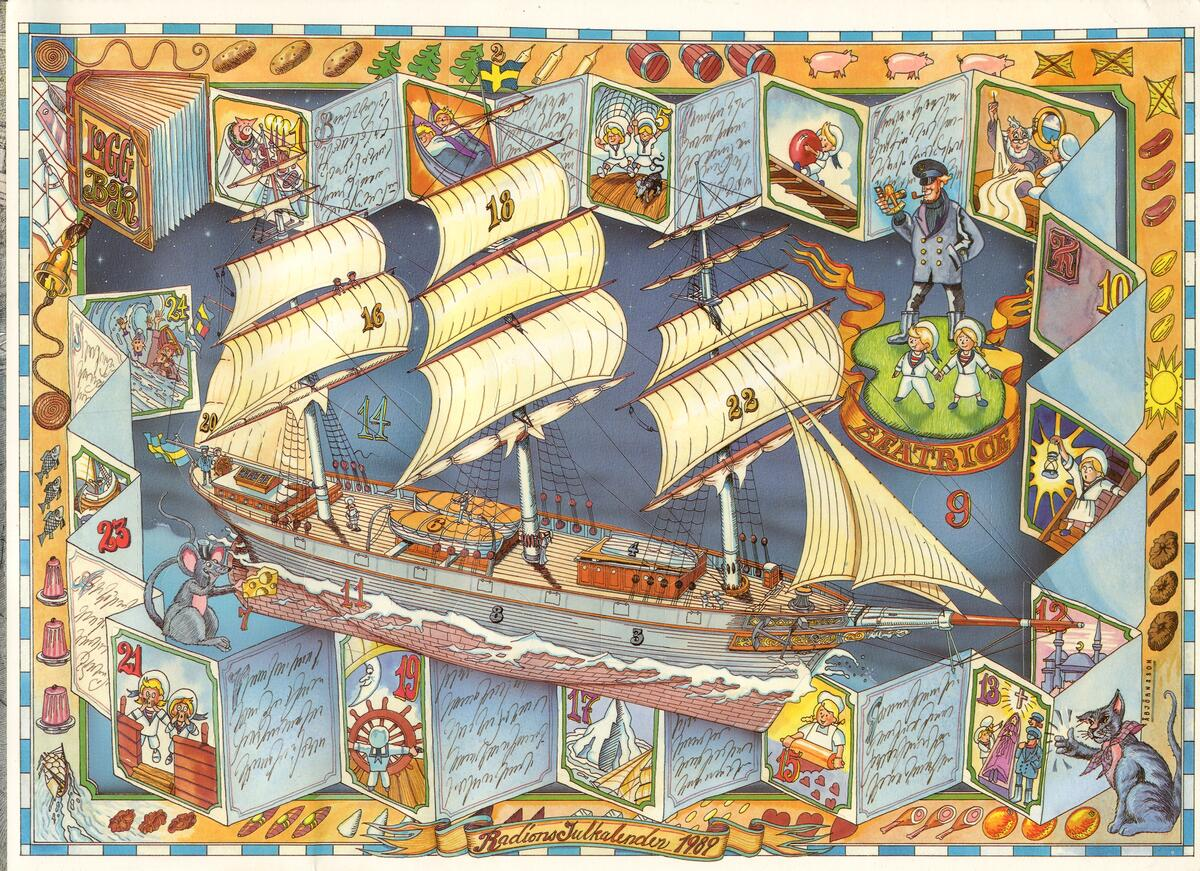
Beatrice on a 1989 paper calendar

Beatrice was the 1989 edition of Sveriges Radio's Christmas Calendar.

== Plot ==
The year is 1889 and for first time after the death of their mother, Johan and Lillan meet their father, seacaptain Mörck. He takes care of the children on board the full-rigged ship Beatrice. With the ship, they sail around the world to pick up food and various other Christmas-related items from different ports around the Earth. They'll be back by Christmas Eve.
