= High Tower =

- Genre: children
- Country of origin: Sweden
- Language: Swedish
- Home station: SR P4
- Written by: Aziza Dhauadi, Andreas Lindgren
- Original release: 1 December – 24 December 2014
- No. of episodes: 24

High Tower was the 2014 edition of Sveriges Radio's Christmas Calendar.

== Plot ==
John, Samira and Anja are all 10 years old, and live inside the "High Tower" highrise building in the locality of "Mårsta". Construction of the building was led by a rich man called Bengt Golnander. Since then, it has decayed and the families have to move out after Christmas. But the children want to continue live there, and start looking for Bengt Golnander.
