= Whitney och Elton Johansson =

- Genre: children
- Country of origin: Sweden
- Language(s): Swedish
- Home station: SR P3
- Starring: Maja Gödicke, Jacob Rippe, Gunilla Johansson, Jan Rippe
- Written by: Per Umaerus, Henrik Wallgren
- Directed by: Per Umaerus, Henrik Wallgren
- Original release: 1 December – 24 December 2002
- No. of episodes: 24

Whitney och Elton Johansson was the 2002 edition of Sveriges Radio's Christmas Calendar.

== Plot ==
Svenne Svennesson runs the Svenne Tower, a high-rise building which serves as the headquarters for his music company, there the recording artists also live.

== Music ==
The music was released to CD in 2002 by the Apparat label, among contributors musicians were After Shave and Lok. The radio series was released to CD by late November 2011.
