= Joels jul =

- Genre: children
- Country of origin: Sweden
- Language(s): Swedish
- Home station: SR P3
- Starring: Hasse Alatalo, Anton Ljungberg, Johanna Bergström
- Written by: Håkan Rudehill
- Directed by: Hasse Alatalo
- Original release: 1 December – 24 December 1992
- No. of episodes: 24

Joels jul (Joel's Christmas) was the 1992 edition of Sveriges Radio's Christmas Calendar.

== Plot ==
Joel is a schoolboy. December is his lucky month, since it includes his birthday, his name day (Oskar), and Christmas.
