= Skäggstölden på Kråkebohöjden =

- Genre: children
- Country of origin: Sweden
- Language(s): Swedish
- Home station: SR P3
- Starring: Peter Harrysson, Täppas Fågelberg, Anja Landgré
- Written by: Hans Erik Lorentz
- Narrated by: Täppas Fågelberg
- Original release: 1 December – 24 December 1985
- No. of episodes: 24

Skäggstölden på Kråkebohöjden (Swedish for "The Beard Theft at Crow's Nest Heights") was the 1985 edition of Sveriges Radio's Christmas Calendar.

== Plot ==
Kråkebohöjden is located on a minor hill beyond fourteen towns and fourteen mountains. It is December, and someone has stolen Santa Claus's beard.

== Cassette tapes ==
In 1985, SR also released songs from the programme on cassette tape.
