= Trollet med den gula kepsen =

- Genre: children
- Country of origin: Sweden
- Language(s): Swedish
- Home station: SR P2, SR P3
- Produced by: Lasse Åkerlund
- Original release: 1 December – 24 December 1988
- No. of episodes: 24

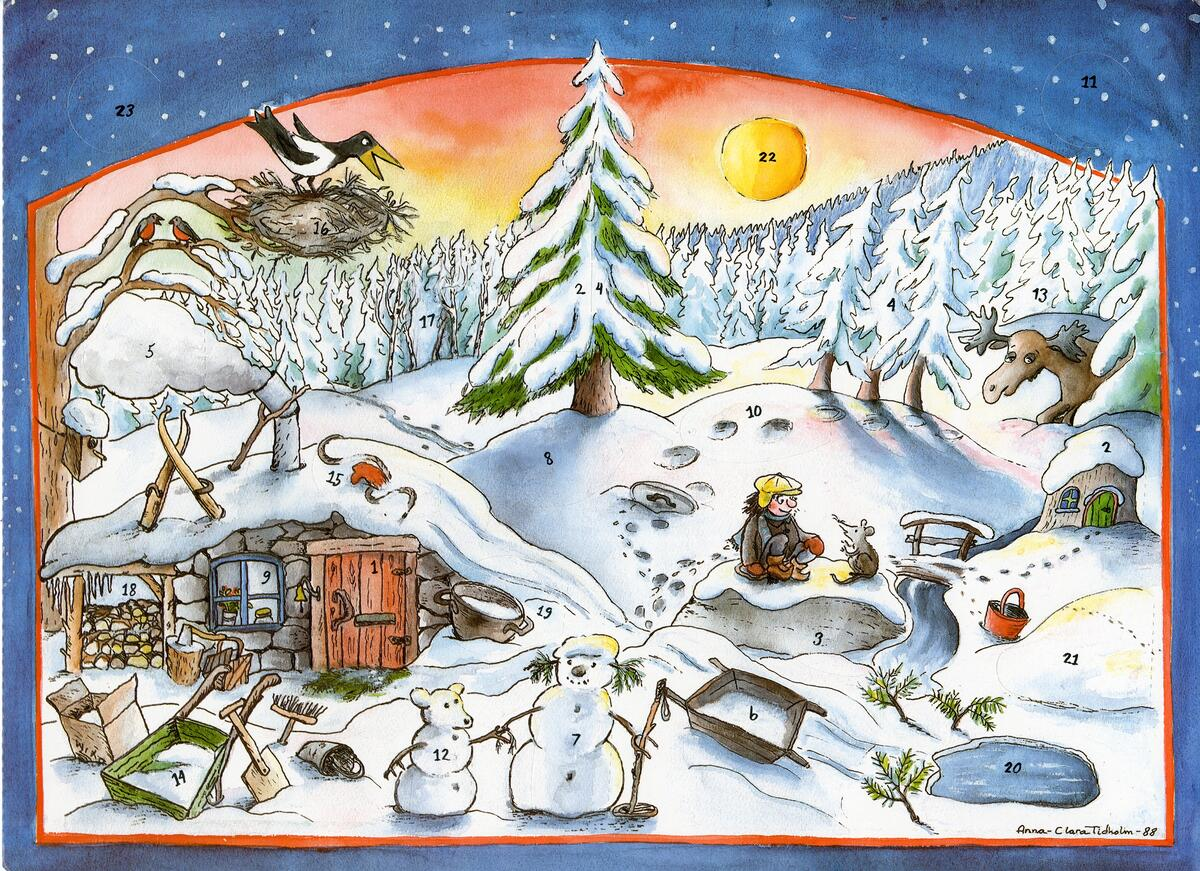
Art from a calendar for Sveriges Radio’s presentation of “Trollet med den gula kepsen”

Trollet med den gula kepsen ("The Troll with the Yellow Cap") was the 1988 edition of Sveriges Radio's Christmas Calendar.

== Plot ==
The story's main character is a troll wearing a yellow cap. This year, the programme sought up younger children as main audience.
