= Det snöar i Indianien =

- Genre: children
- Country of origin: Sweden
- Language(s): Swedish
- Home station: SR P3
- Starring: Rickard Claeson, Mylaine Hedreul, Linus Wahlgren, Erik Blixt, Hasse Pihl, Mikael Syrén, Figge Norling, Gunvor Pontén, Carl-Magnus Dellow
- Written by: Hasse Pihl, Mikael Syrén
- Directed by: Hasse Pihl, Mikael Syrén
- Produced by: Bosse Ternström
- Original release: 1 December – 24 December 1999
- No. of episodes: 24

Det snöar i Indianien ("It's Snowing in Indiania") was the 1999 edition of Sveriges Radio's Christmas Calendar. The music of the series was written by Martin Svensson and Dilba, at this time both were together and worked together a lot.

== Plot ==
The series is set in the fictional Native American village of "Indianien", located in a glade next to a river.
