= Allans och Martins julradioshow =

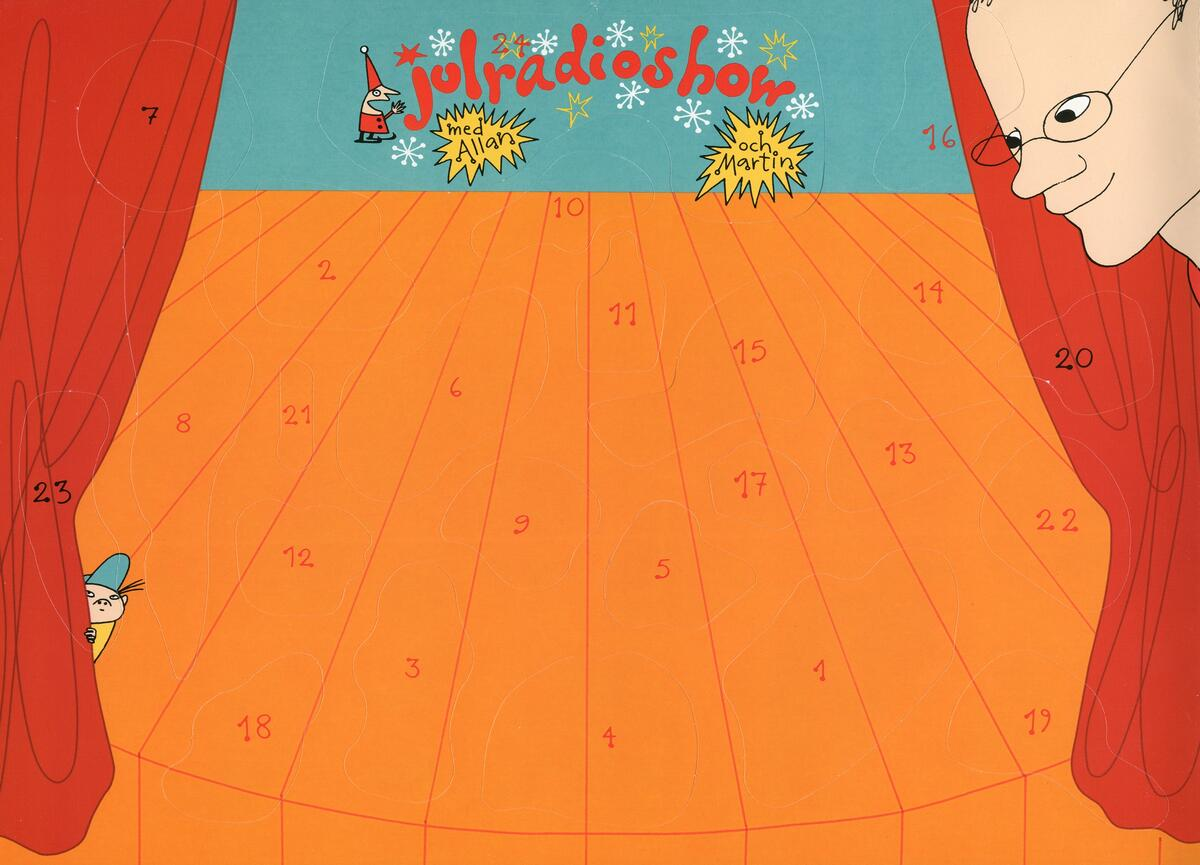
- Allans och Martins julradioshow, 2001 paper calendar
- Genre: children
- Country of origin: Sweden
- Language(s): Swedish
- Home station: SR P1, SR P3
- Starring: Lars in de Betou, Martin Widman
- Written by: Lars in de Betou, Martin Widman
- Produced by: Ann-Marie Fågelström
- Original release: 1 December – 24 December 2001
- No. of episodes: 24

Allans och Martins julradioshow (Allan and Martin's Christmas Radio Show) was the 2001 edition of Sveriges Radio's Christmas Calendar.

== Plot ==
Allan starts a Christmas radio programme.
