= Titteliture =

- Also known as: Barnens adventskalender
- Genre: Children
- Country of origin: Sweden
- Original language: Swedish
- No. of seasons: 1
- No. of episodes: 24

Production
- Production company: Sveriges Radio-TV

Original release
- Network: SVT
- Release: 27 November – 24 December 1960

Related
- I trollskogen (1959; Radio only); Julbåten Juliana (1961)

Titteliture is the Sveriges Television's Christmas calendar and Sveriges Radio's Christmas Calendar in 1960. The radio version was called Barnens adventskalender ('The Children's Christmas Calendar').

== Plot ==
Every day, except for Wednesdays (which were TV-broadcasting-free in Sweden at that time), a "tomte" called Titteliture (a name created from tittut, the Swedish term for "peekaboo") opens a calendar window. Behind each calendar window is a guest, and adventure or a riddle.
