= Liv i luckan =

- Genre: children
- Country of origin: Sweden
- Language: Swedish
- Home station: SR P1
- Starring: Lisa Quensel, Lena Marcusson
- Produced by: Gunnar Barke
- Original release: 1 December – 24 December 1980
- No. of episodes: 24

Liv i luckan (roughly 'Action Behind the Calendar Window') was the 1980 edition of Sveriges Radio's Christmas Calendar.

== Plot ==
Reporters Maud Nylin and Ulf Billberger visit various places in Sweden.
