= Julbestyr på en bondgård =

- Genre: children
- Country of origin: Sweden
- Language: Swedish
- Home station: SR
- Produced by: Rolf Bergström
- Original release: 1958

Julbestyr på en bondgård ('Christmas Preparations on a Farm') is the 1958 edition of Sveriges Radio's Christmas Calendar.

== Plot ==
Rolf Bergström from Sveriges Radio's children's section goes to an Uppland farm in Sweden, where he joins in the Christmas preparations together with the farmer's three children, Gunnel (14 years old), Magnus (12), and baby brother Gunnar (6). Their mother Anna-Lisa and their father Erik also take part in the programmes. In each episode, one of the children sings a Christmas song.
