= Gammelfarmors chiffonjé =

- Genre: children
- Country of origin: Sweden
- Language(s): Swedish
- Home station: SR P1
- Starring: Lisa Quensel, Lena Marcusson
- Written by: Birgit Bergkvist
- Original release: 1 December – 24 December 1979
- No. of episodes: 24

Gammelfarmors chiffonjé ("Great Grandmother's Chiffonier") was the 1979 edition of Sveriges Radio's Christmas Calendar.

== Plot ==
83-years-old widow Maria Beata Josefina lives in a retirement home. She's the great-grandmother to the children Anders, Filippa, Hilda and the baby Beata on their father's side.
