= Tomtar på loftet =

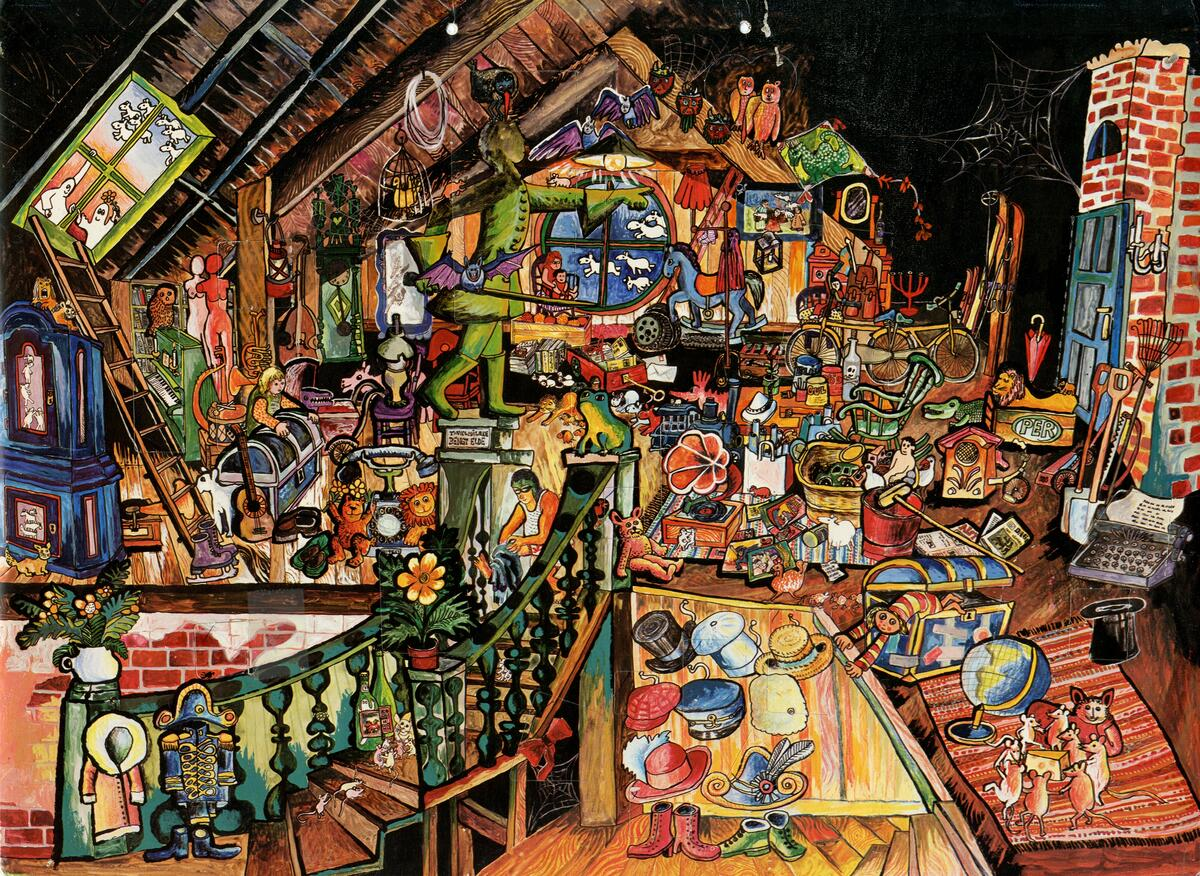
- Tomtar på loftet
- Genre: children
- Country of origin: Sweden
- Language(s): Swedish
- Home station: SR
- Starring: Lisa Åberg
- Written by: Monica Lind
- Produced by: Iréne Winqvist
- Original release: 1977 – 1977

Tomtar på loftet was the 1977 edition of Sveriges Radio's Christmas Calendar.

== Plot ==
7 year old Lisa gets tired of her mother's cleaning for Christmas. She goes to the attic, discovering various exciting things.
