= Sara Kadefors =

Swedish writer and film director (born 1965)

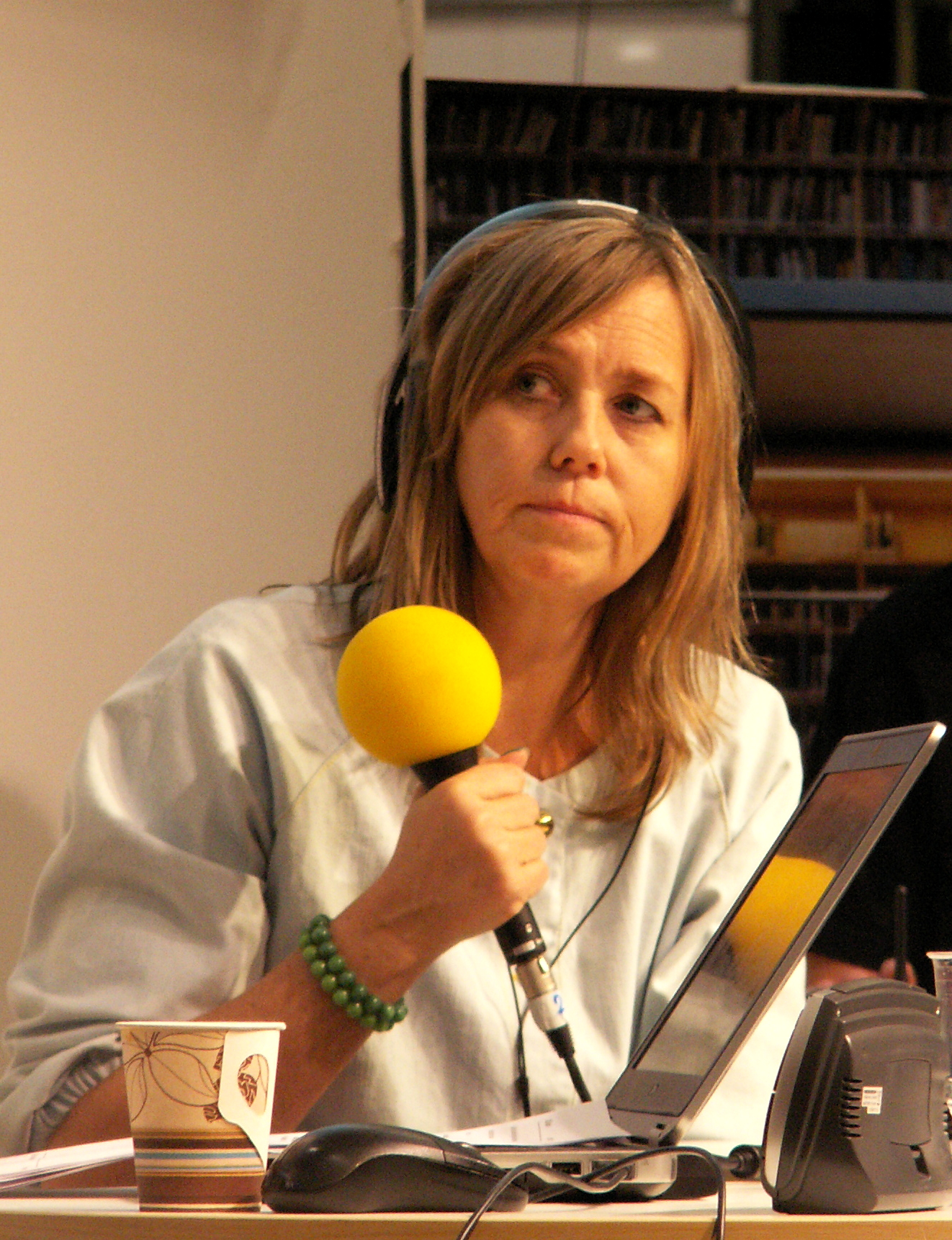
- Born: 19 September 1965 (age 60); Gothenburg, Sweden
- Writing career
- Genres: Children's literature, novel

Sara Kadefors (born 19 September 1965) is a Swedish writer and film director.

She was born in Gothenburg and grew up in Landvetter. From 1989 to 1996, she was host for a number of popular radio and television programs. Her first novel Långlördag i city, published in 2001, received an award from the Swedish Writers' Union. Her second novel Sandor Slash Ida, published in the same year, was awarded the August Prize and became the best-selling Swedish young adult novel of all time. Kadefors has also written a number of novels for adults, including Fågelbovägen 32.

Kadefors wrote the script for Allt du önskar, Sveriges Radio's Christmas Calendar for 2011.

== Selected films ==
- Fröken Sverige (2004), wrote script
- Orka! Orka! (2004), wrote script
- Oh Shit!, short (2005), wrote script & directed
- Sandor slash Ida (2005), wrote script
- Sluta stöna eller dö (2007), wrote script & directed
