= Sandor slash Ida (film) =

- Swedish DVD cover
- Directed by: Henrik Georgsson
- Written by: Sandor slash Ida by Sara Kadefors
- Produced by: Karl Fredrik Ulfung
- Starring: Aliette Opheim; Andrej Lunusjkin
- Cinematography: Anders Bohman
- Edited by: Stefan Sundlöf
- Distributed by: Sandrew Metronome
- Release date: 4 February 2005 (Sweden)
- Running time: 97 minutes
- Country: Sweden
- Language: Swedish

Sandor slash Ida is a 2005 Swedish tragicomedy film which was released to cinemas in Sweden on 4 February 2005, directed by Henrik Georgsson, starring Aliette Opheim and Andrej Lunusjkin. It is based on the in Sweden best selling novel Sandor slash Ida by Sara Kadefors.

== Plot ==
Ida lives recklessly, with heavy drinking and a series of boyfriends, while Sandor is more reserved, with few friends, and a mother who insists he practice ballet. They meet in a chat room and, despite their differences, find they have a lot in common. Though they live in separate cities, Sandor makes an unexpected visit to Ida, which ends badly when he feels betrayed—her friends, high on drugs, reveal that Ida had been gossiping about him.

Hurt, Sandor tells Ida he never wants to see her again and goes back home. A few weeks later, after Ida's mother overdoses, she reaches out to Sandor for comfort and visits him. However, their reunion turns into another argument, this time over Ida feeling mistreated by Sandor's mother, prompting her to leave again. Later, Ida attends Sandor's ballet premiere, where they reconcile, hinting at a happy future together.
