= Barnens adventskalender =

- Genre: children
- Country of origin: Sweden
- Language: Swedish
- Home station: Sveriges Radio
- Produced by: Rolf Bergström
- Original release: 1 December – 24 December 1957
- No. of episodes: 24

Barnens adventskalender ('The Children's Advent Calendar'), broadcast at 7:55 each morning between 1 and 24 December 1957, is the first in what was to become an annual series of children's Yuletide programmes – Sveriges Radios julkalender – produced by Swedish radio station Sveriges Radio.

Each five-minute programme featured a group of children singing a Christmas song or carol, talking to radio producer Rolf Bergström about their plans and preparations for Christmas, and then describing the image revealed as they opened each day's door on a special advent calendar.

Children at home could join in by cutting out the small copies of these images printed in the weekly radio programme guide Röster i Radio and sticking them on the outline picture of a Christmas tree also printed in the magazine.

Bergström got the idea after seeing Girl Guides selling copies of their movement's advent calendar in a bookshop.
