= Frida och farfar =

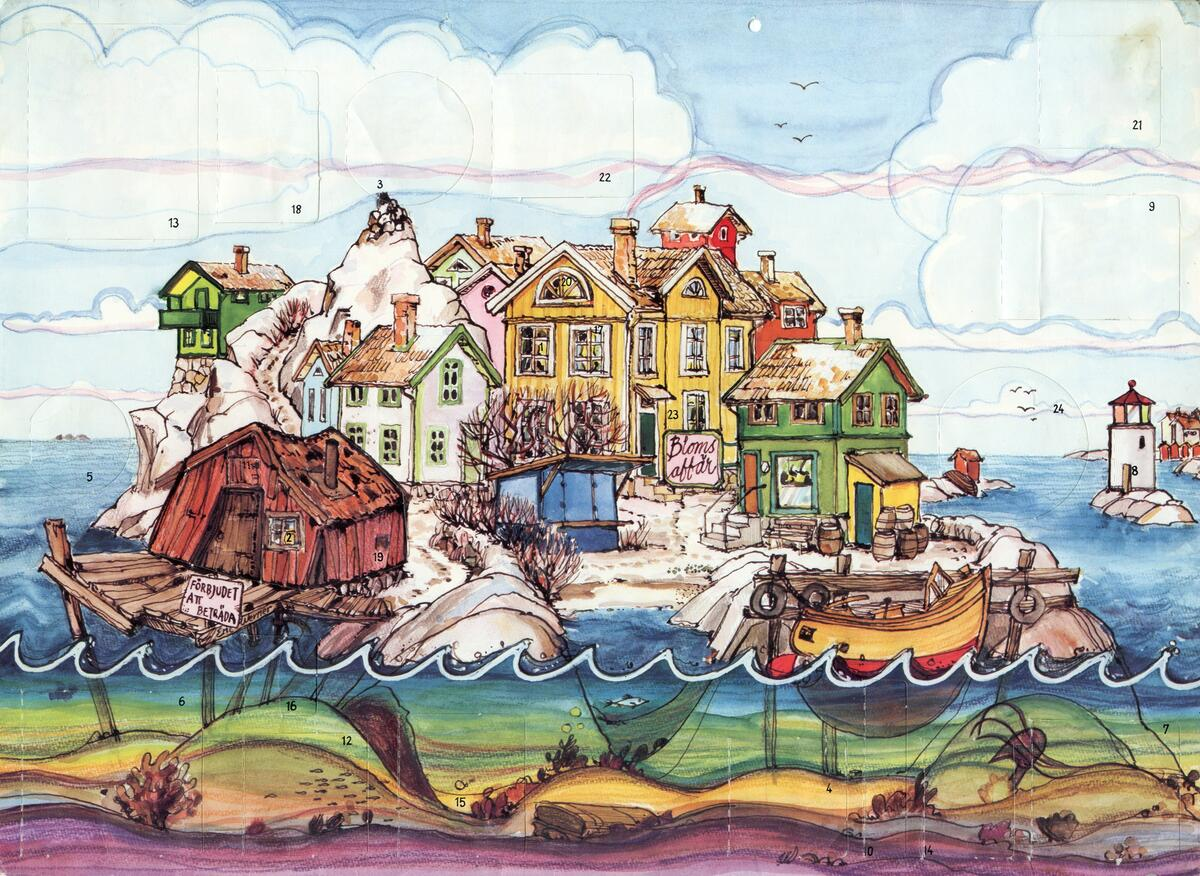
- Frida och farfar, 1974 paper calendar
- Genre: children
- Country of origin: Sweden
- Language(s): Swedish
- Home station: SR
- Starring: Carin Hjulström
- Produced by: Agneta Leffler
- Original release: 1974 – 1974

Frida och farfar ("Frida and Grandfather) was the 1974 edition of Sveriges Radio's Christmas Calendar.

== Plot ==
It's December, and Frida has broken a leg. She misses school and her friends. It's boring at home, and living on a minor Bohuslän island in Sweden, it's hard to rech mainland Sweden in the wintertime. With her parents working, she stays home with her grandfather on her father's side (who actually is her great grandfather on her father's side).
