= Sagor från Blåbärsberget =

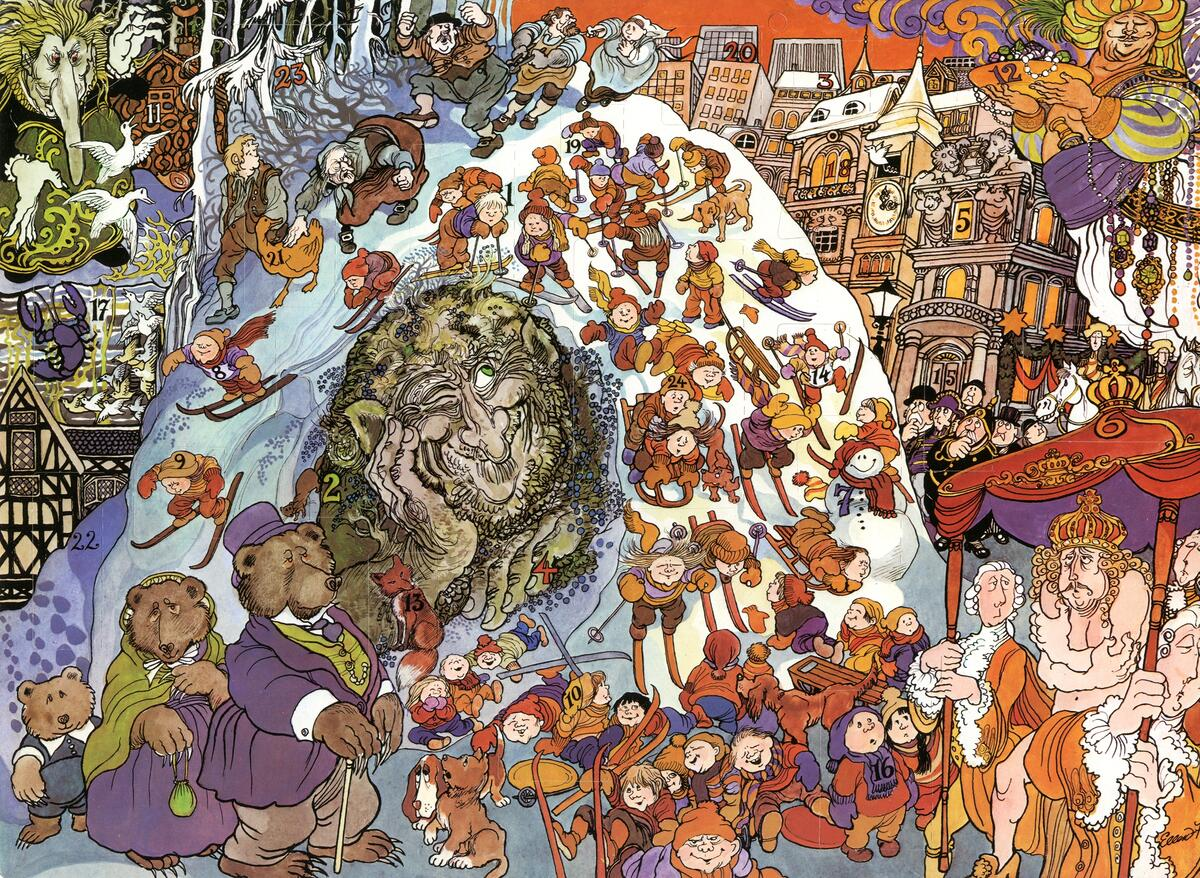
- Sagor från Blåbärsberget paper calendar
- Genre: children
- Country of origin: Sweden
- Language(s): Swedish
- Home station: SR
- Starring: Roland Wilén, Margreth Weivers, Solveig Samzelius, Olle Johansson, Lilga Kovanko
- Produced by: Rolf Bergström, Lars Rundgren
- Original release: 1978 – 1978

Sagor från Blåbärsberget ("Tales from the Blueberry Mountain") was the 1978 edition of Sveriges Radio's Christmas Calendar.

== Plot ==
This year, the programme consisted of various fairytales from all over the world.
