= Tomtefamiljen i Storskogen =

- Genre: children
- Country of origin: Sweden
- Original language: Swedish
- No. of seasons: 1
- No. of episodes: 23

Production
- Production company: Sveriges Radio-TV

Original release
- Network: SVT
- Release: 2 December – 24 December 1962

Related
- Julbåten Juliana (1961); Den tänkande brevbäraren (1963)

Tomtefamiljen i Storskogen ('The Santa Claus Family in the Big Forest') is the Sveriges Television's Christmas calendar and Sveriges Radio's Christmas Calendar in 1962.

== Plot ==
A tomte family travels across Sweden by helicopter collecting wish lists from the children.
