= Broster, Broster! =

- Genre: children
- Created by: Göran Tunström
- Country of origin: Sweden
- Original language: Swedish
- No. of seasons: 1
- No. of episodes: 26

Production
- Production company: Sveriges Radio-TV

Original release
- Network: TV1
- Release: 28 November – 24 December 1971

Related
- Regnbågslandet (1970); Barnen i Höjden (1972)

Broster, Broster! is the Sveriges Television's Christmas calendar and Sveriges Radio's Christmas Calendar in 1971.

== Plot ==
The Wikmansson family consists of Linda, the mother, Ludde, the father, as well as their daughter Agnes, the adoptive son Bertil and their adoptive-father. Linda, the mother, was pregnant and the major issue was if their child would be a boy or a girl. The baby in the womb was called "broster" (a combination of bror and syster, i.e. brother and sister). The family also fought pollution and shopping hysteria.

The series has been referred to as a 1970s version of the Christmas gospel, where the characters move out into the countryside.

== Later ==
The series is one of the titles in the 2009 book Tusen svenska klassiker (2009). Reruns aired between 23 February-6 April 1982.
