= Julstrul med Staffan & Bengt =

- Genre: children
- Written by: Hans Fällman; Benny Karlsson
- Directed by: Arne Eriksson
- Starring: Staffan Ling; Bengt Andersson; Sissela Kyle
- Country of origin: Sweden
- Original language: Swedish
- No. of seasons: 1
- No. of episodes: 24

Original release
- Network: TV1
- Release: 1 December – 24 December 1984

Related
- Lille Luj och Änglaljus i strumpornas hus (1983); Trolltider med trollkalendern (1985)

Julstrul med Staffan & Bengt ("Christmas Trouble with Staffan & Bengt") is the Sveriges Television's Christmas calendar in 1984. Almost one in four Swedes watched the show.

== Plot ==
Staffan Ling and Bengt Andersson work in a general store in a village in rural Västerbotten, far away from the town of Umeå.

== Video ==
In 2007, the series was released to DVD.
