= Farbror Pekkas handelsbod =

Sveriges Radio-TV's 1965 Christmas calendar

- Genre: children
- Country of origin: Sweden
- Original language: Swedish
- No. of seasons: 1
- No. of episodes: 27

Production
- Production company: Sveriges Radio-TV

Original release
- Network: SVT
- Release: 28 November – 24 December 1965

Related
- Lill-Stina på reportage i Storskogen (1964); En småstad vid seklets början (1966)

Farbror Pekkas handelsbod ('Uncle Pekka's General Store') is the Sveriges Television's Christmas calendar and Sveriges Radio's Christmas Calendar in 1965.

== Plot ==
Pekka Langer runs a shop in the fictional village of Vinterbo in northern Sweden, where he sold Christmas things. The villagers often came to the various shops and shopped. Pekka Langer was also visited by a family from the city who rented a summer cottage, and one day they visited a Sami family. The music in the series was performed by students from Nacka Music School. The script was written by Lars Björkman and the producer was Torbjörn Wiléen .
