= Regnbågslandet =

- Also known as: Med Nanna i Regnbågslandet
- Genre: children
- Country of origin: Sweden
- Original language: Swedish
- No. of seasons: 1
- No. of episodes: 26

Production
- Production company: Sveriges Radio-TV

Original release
- Network: TV1
- Release: 29 November – 24 December 1970

Related
- Herkules Jonssons storverk (1969); Broster, Broster! (1971)

Regnbågslandet ("The Rainbow Land") is the Sveriges Television's Christmas calendar and Sveriges Radio's Christmas Calendar in 1970.

== Plot ==
Each time every day, Nanna walks through a gate in a tree, leading to the "Rainbow Land". Leaving December darkness for to a world of summer and greenery, she teaches the Rainbow Land inhabitants about Christmas.
