= Rulle på Rullseröd =

Sveriges Television's 1974 Christmas calendar

- Genre: children
- Written by: Olle Mattson
- Directed by: Hans Abramson
- Country of origin: Sweden
- Original language: Swedish
- No. of seasons: 1
- No. of episodes: 24

Production
- Production company: Sveriges Radio-TV

Original release
- Network: TV1
- Release: 1 December – 24 December 1974

Related
- Mumindalen (1973); Långtradarchaufförens berättelser (1975)

Rulle på Rullseröd ("Rulle at Rullseröd") is the Sveriges Television's Christmas calendar in 1974.

== Plot ==
Rulle lives on a farm in Bohuslän in Sweden together with his grandfather and grandmother on his father's side.

== Video ==
On 24 October 2012, the series was released to DVD.
