= Lill-Stina på reportage i Storskogen =

- Also known as: En gård nära Tomteskogen i Vilhelmina
- Genre: children
- Country of origin: Sweden
- Original language: Swedish
- No. of seasons: 1
- No. of episodes: 26

Production
- Production company: Sveriges Radio-TV

Original release
- Network: SVT
- Release: 29 November – 24 December 1964

Related
- Den tänkande brevbäraren (1963); Farbror Pekkas handelsbod (1965)

Lill-Stina på reportage i Storskogen ('Lill-Stina Reporting from the Big Forest') is Sveriges Television's Christmas calendar and Sveriges Radio's Christmas Calendar in 1964. The radio version was called En gård nära Tomteskogen i Vilhelmina ('A Farm Close to the Santa Claus Forest in Vilhelmina').

== Plot ==
The TV version features of a children's Aktuellt-like news studio from the forest, where reporter Lill-Stina ('Little Stina') delivers news reports. The radio version is set at Forsberga farm in southern Swedish Lapland, following Christmas preparations.
