= Julbåten Juliana =

1961 Swedish TV and radio Christmas programme

- Also known as: Julbåtens resa runt jorden
- Genre: children
- Country of origin: Sweden
- Original language: Swedish
- No. of seasons: 1
- No. of episodes: 22

Production
- Production company: Sveriges Radio-TV

Original release
- Network: SVT
- Release: 3 December – 24 December 1961

Related
- Titteliture (1960); Tomtefamiljen i Storskogen (1962)

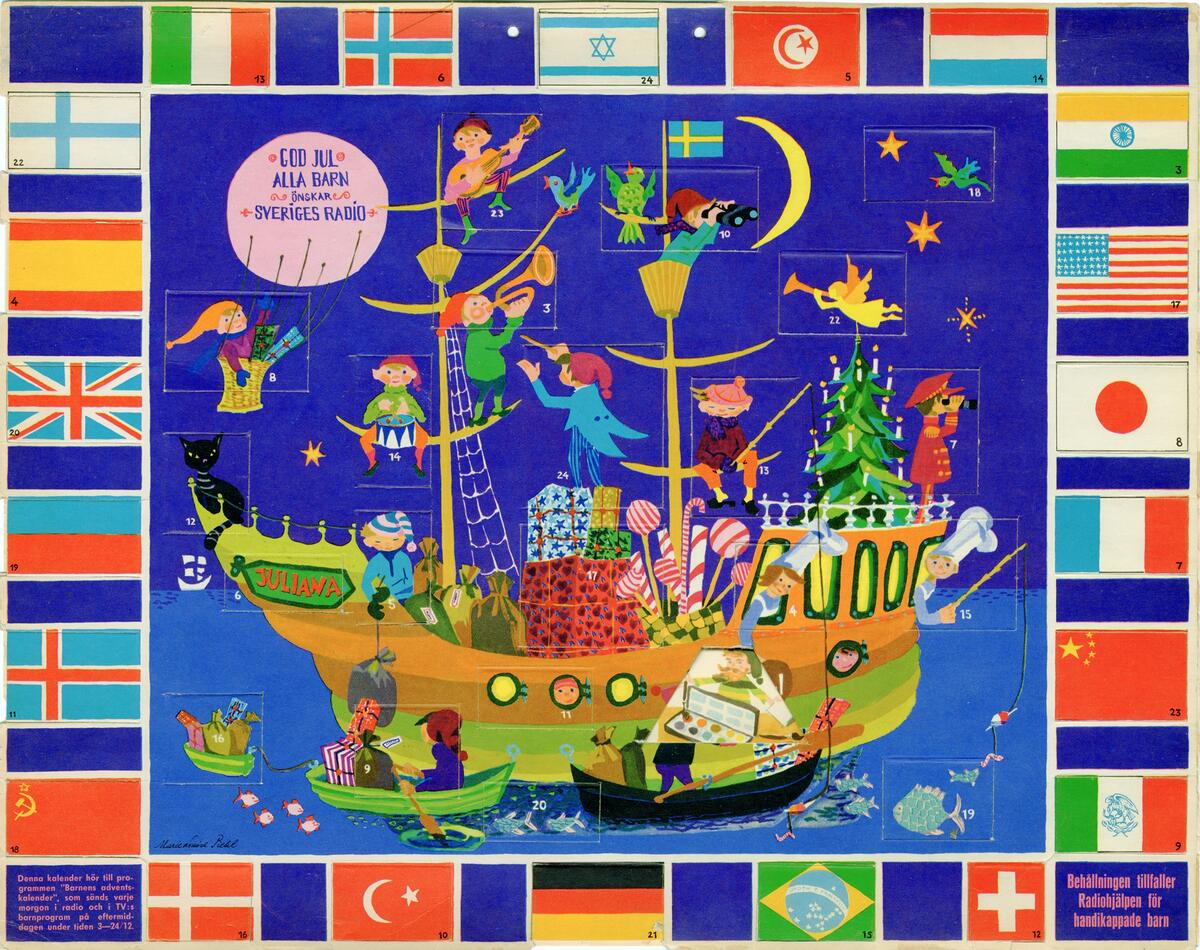
Juliana on a 1961 paper calendar

Julbåten Juliana ('Juliana, the Christmas Boat') is the Sveriges Television's Christmas calendar and Sveriges Radio's Christmas Calendar in 1961. The radio version was called Julbåtens resa runt jorden ('The Christmas Boat's Journey Around the Earth').

== Plot ==
The story follows the crewmembers of the vessel Juliana, bringing products from foreign ports into Sweden in time for Christmas. The idea was to show how Swedish Christmas celebrations rely on international trade.
