= Mumindalen (TV series) =

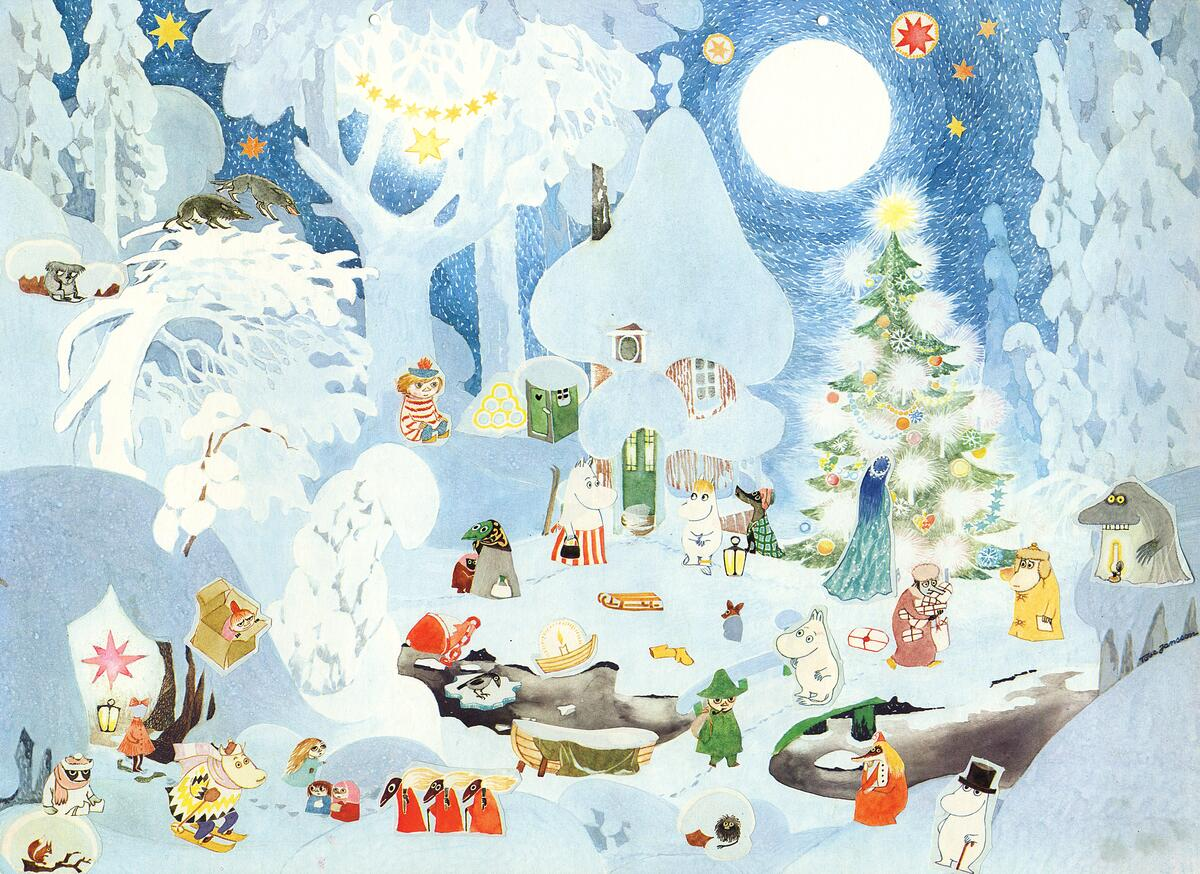
- Also known as: Jul i Mumindalen
- Genre: Children's television
- Based on: Moomin by Tove Jansson and Lars Jansson
- Developed by: Pi Lind; Ingegerd Lönnroth
- Narrated by: Toivo Pawlo
- Country of origin: Sweden
- Original language: Swedish
- No. of seasons: 1
- No. of episodes: 24

Production
- Production company: Sveriges Radio-TV

Original release
- Network: SVT2
- Release: 1 December – 24 December 1973

Related
- Barnen i Höjden (1972); Rulle på Rullseröd (1974)

Mumindalen ("Moominvalley"), also known as Jul i Mumindalen ("Christmas in Moominvalley") is Sveriges Television's Christmas calendar TV series in 1973. The series is a live-action show based on the Moomin characters created by Finnish writer Tove Jansson. The actors were wearing suits, and voices were recorded later.

== Episodes ==
1. Det ensamma mumintrollet
2. Det förtrollade badhuset
3. Lilla My åker kana
4. Den stora kölden
5. Isfrun kommer
6. Den stora brasan
7. Möte med en förfader
8. Knytt och hemuler
9. Vad ska vi göra med hemulen?
10. Snöstorm
11. På väg tillsammans
12. Den första våren
13. Muminmamman
14. Förfäder och sonsöner
15. Vårvisan
16. Förfadern försvinner
17. Sommar i mumindalen
18. På en obebodd ö
19. Åska
20. En vacker dam flyter iland
21. Det osynliga barnet
22. Att våga bli arg
23. Det farliga kommer
24. Julafton

== Home media ==
The series was released to VHS and DVD on 26 October 2005. Prior to that, it was screened in Denmark in 1980, Finland in 1983 and 1994, and Iceland in 1993, the latter becoming the first imported series of any Jóladagatal Sjónvarpsins.
