= Sveriges Radio's Christmas Calendar =

- Other names: Sveriges Radio's Advent Calendar
- Genre: Children
- Country of origin: Sweden
- Language(s): Swedish
- Home station: SR
- Original release: 1957
- Website: sverigesradio.se/julkalendern

Sveriges Radio's Christmas Calendar (Swedish: Sveriges Radios julkalender) is an annual series of pre-Christmas children's programmes produced and broadcast by Sveriges Radio in the form of a radio advent calendar. The first series – entitled Barnens adventskalender – was broadcast in 1957.

From 1960 until 1972, the same Christmas calendar was produced in a radio version for Sveriges Radio and a television version for Sveriges Television. Since 1973, there have been separate Christmas calendar programmes on radio and TV.

== List ==
- 1957 – Barnens adventskalender
- 1958 – Julbestyr på en bondgård
- 1959 – I trollskogen
- 1960 – Titteliture
- 1961 – Julbåtens resa runt jorden
- 1962 – Tomtefamiljen i Storskogen
- 1963 – Den tänkande brevbäraren
- 1964 – En gård nära Tomteskogen i Vilhelmina
- 1965 – Farbror Pekkas handelsbod
- 1966 – En jul för 50 år sedan
- 1967 – Gumman som blev liten som en tesked
- 1968 – Klart spår till Tomteboda
- 1969 – Herkules Jonssons storverk
- 1970 – Regnbågslandet
- 1971 – Broster, Broster!
- 1972 – När sagan blommade
- 1973 – Tjong i baljan!
- 1974 – Frida och farfar
- 1975 – Albert och Evelina
- 1976 – Gumman som blev liten som en tesked (rerun)
- 1977 – Tomtar på loftet
- 1978 – Sagor från Blåbärsberget
- 1979 – Gammelfarmors chiffonjé
- 1980 – Liv i luckan
- 1981 – Jakten på julen
- 1982 – Ett skepp kommer lastat
- 1983 – Pricken Jansson knackar på
- 1984 – Kulänglarna
- 1985 – Skäggstölden på Kråkebohöjden
- 1986 – Bland tomtar och troll
- 1987 – Skor-Sten i den tidlösa tiden
- 1988 – Trollet med den gula kepsen
- 1989 – Beatrice
- 1990 – Kråkan och Mamma Mu
- 1991 – Bäjkån och Bällman
- 1992 – Joels jul
- 1993 – Grod jul på Näsbrännan
- 1994 – Hertig Hans slott
- 1995 – Hotell Pepparkaka
- 1996 – Bråkar och Johanna
- 1997 – Gumman som blev liten som en tesked (rerun)
- 1998 – Familjen Anderssons sjuka jul
- 1999 – Det snöar i Indianien
- 2000 – Snälla Py
- 2001 – Allans och Martins julradioshow
- 2002 – Whitney och Elton Johansson
- 2003 – Samma gamla visa
- 2004 – Hjärtats hjältar
- 2005 – Den mytiska medaljongen
- 2006 – Toivos kosmos
- 2007 – Gumman som blev liten som en tesked (rerun)
- 2008 – Klappkampen
- 2009 – Nelly Rapp - En gastkramande jul
- 2010 – De vilda helgonen
- 2011 – Allt du önskar
- 2012 – Siri och ishavspiraterna
- 2013 – Alla barnen firar jul
- 2014 – High Tower
- 2015 – Månsaråttan
- 2016 – Lyckoborgen
- 2017 – Marvinter
- 2018 – Tonje i Glimmerdalen
- 2019 – Biggest Bang
- 2020 - Knäckarbanketten
- 2021 - Spero (radio programme)

== See also ==
- Jullovsmorgon
- Sommarlovsmorgon
- Sveriges Television's Christmas calendar
