= Den tänkande brevbäraren =

- Also known as: Brevbäraren vid Radiogränd
- Genre: children
- Country of origin: Sweden
- Original language: Swedish
- No. of seasons: 1
- No. of episodes: 24

Production
- Production company: Sveriges Radio-TV

Original release
- Network: SVT
- Release: 1 December – 24 December 1963

Related
- Tomtefamiljen i Storskogen (1962); Lill-Stina på reportage i Storskogen (1964)

Den tänkande brevbäraren ('The Thinking Postman') is the Sveriges Television's Christmas calendar and Sveriges Radio's Christmas Calendar in 1963. The radio version was called Brevbäraren vid Radiogränd ("The Postman at Radio Alley").

== Plot ==
Kalle works as a postman. When there's time enough, he talks with the people living in the districts where he works.
