= Kids America =

American children's public radio show

Kids America was a 90-minute syndicated public radio show for young children. It was broadcast from 1984 to 1987 on weeknights on public radio stations in the United States by American Public Radio, the forerunner of Public Radio International. First produced by WNYC in New York City as Small Things Considered, it won a Peabody award in 1984. In October 1985 the show's name was changed to Kids America. At the time of its 1987 cancellation, the program originated at WNYC's new Manhattan Municipal Building studios and was carried by 26 stations.

== Characters/Segments ==
The show was hosted by Kathy O'Connell and Larry Orfaly. Each 30 minute segment on Kids America featured a character or guest. These included:

- Dr. Rita Book (E. A. "Betsy" Hass)
- Xeno The Alien (Dan Hagen)
- Martha's Mishaps (Martha Dodge)
- The Duke of Words (Stuart Leigh)
- Marcy's Party (Marcy Mankoff)
- Susan's Songs (Susan Dias)
- Mother Nature
- Al Unctuous
- Dr. Fad (Ken Hakuta)
- Bob Public Radio (NPR intern Ira Glass who went on to a notable career in Public Radio)

A wide variety of music was also played from rock music to classical music during each half-hour segment. The show's engineer was David Nolan.

== Cancellation ==
The final show aired on Christmas Eve 1987 after the Corporation for Public Broadcasting decided not to renew a grant which provided funding for the program. WNYC, the station which produced Kids America, declined to pursue other underwriting possibilities and in the following January secured trademarks on certain characters so they could not be re-used. After its cancellation, O’Connell continued her career in radio hosting Kids Corner on WXPN in Philadelphia.

At its cancellation, the show was broadcast on 26 stations nationwide and drew over 6,000 letters and phone calls per week. One of the difficulties of the show, and children's radio in general in the US, is that radio ratings do not count listeners less than 12 years old. This created a lack of incentive for radio stations to carry Kids America or any other children's radio programming.

The cancellation of Kids America left the United States with no nationally distributed radio programs aimed at children until Radio AAHS started to expand outside of Minneapolis in October 1992.
