= Herkules Jonssons storverk =

- Genre: children
- Country of origin: Sweden
- Original language: Swedish
- No. of seasons: 1
- No. of episodes: 25

Production
- Production company: Sveriges Radio-TV

Original release
- Network: SVT
- Release: 30 November – 24 December 1969

Related
- Klart spår till Tomteboda (1968); Regnbågslandet (1970)

Herkules Jonssons storverk ("The Labours of Hercules Jonsson") is the Sveriges Television's Christmas calendar and Sveriges Radio's Christmas Calendar in 1969. The screenplay was written by Tage Danielsson.

== Plot ==
The series is set in a Stockholm suburb where a family, consisting of the mother, the father and their son reside. The mother knows the magical phrase "Överliggande kramaxel å kalasvev å bubbla förknasare" (made up of humorously altered names of several car parts), allowing the father Herkules and the son, Bara Johnsson, to switch places with each other; the father to become the son and vice verse.
