= Långtradarchaufförens berättelser =

- Genre: children
- Created by: Beppe Wolgers
- Written by: Beppe Wolgers
- Directed by: Beppe Wolgers
- Country of origin: Sweden
- Original language: Swedish
- No. of seasons: 1
- No. of episodes: 24

Production
- Production company: Sveriges Radio-TV

Original release
- Network: TV1
- Release: 1 December – 24 December 1975

Related
- Rulle på Rullseröd (1974); Gumman som blev liten som en tesked (1976)

Långtradarchaufförens berättelser ("The Lorry Driver's Stories") is the Sveriges Television's Christmas calendar in 1975.

== Plot ==
The main character, played by Beppe Wolgers, is travelling in his lorry together with the dolls Posi and Maggan.

== Music ==
An LP with the soundtrack music was also released the same year.
