= Klart spår till Tomteboda =

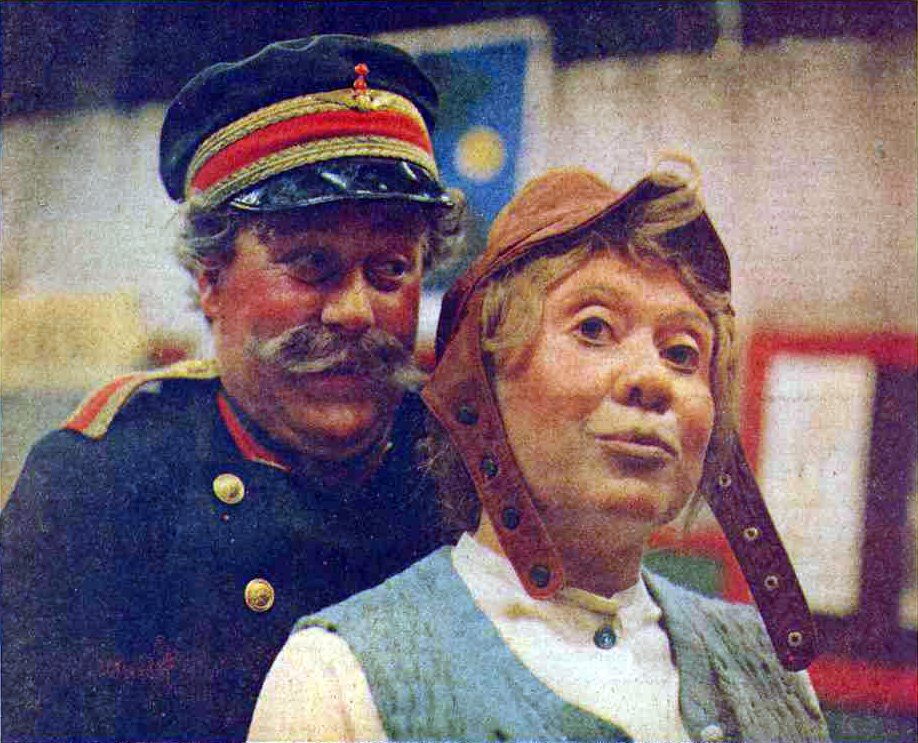
- Hans Lindgren and Inga Gill in Klart spår till Tomteboda.
- Genre: children
- Country of origin: Sweden
- Original language: Swedish
- No. of seasons: 1
- No. of episodes: 24

Production
- Production company: Sveriges Radio-TV

Original release
- Network: SVT
- Release: 1 December – 24 December 1968

Related
- Gumman som blev liten som en tesked (1967); Herkules Jonssons storverk (1969)

Klart spår till Tomteboda ("Clear Track to Tomteboda") is the Sveriges Television's Christmas calendar and Sveriges Radio's Christmas Calendar in 1968.

== Plot ==
Svante works as stationmaster at Tomteboda station, a minor station were a very few trains stop.
