= Barnen i Höjden =

- Also known as: När sagan blommade
- Genre: children
- Country of origin: Sweden
- Original language: Swedish
- No. of seasons: 1
- No. of episodes: 24

Production
- Production company: Sveriges Radio-TV

Original release
- Network: TV1
- Release: 30 November – 24 December 1972

Related
- Broster, Broster! (1972); Tjong i baljan! (radio) Mumindalen (1973)

Barnen i Höjden ("The Children on The Height") is the Sveriges Television's Christmas calendar and Sveriges Radio's Christmas Calendar in 1972. The radio version was called När sagan blommade ("When the Fairytale Blossomed").

== Plot ==
The series is set inside a 24-store highrise apartment building, "Höjden".

== DVD ==
The series was released to DVD on 23 October 2013.
