= I trollskogen =

- Genre: Children
- Country of origin: Sweden
- Language: Swedish
- Home station: SR P1
- Hosted by: Rolf Bergström
- Starring: Marianne Högstedt, Jörgen Lindström
- Written by: Barbro Ryberg-Edlund
- Produced by: Rolf Bergström
- Original release: 29 November – 24 December 1959
- No. of episodes: 26

I trollskogen ('In the Troll Forest') is the 1959 edition of Sveriges Radio's Christmas Calendar. For first time, the story was a work of drama/fiction.

== Plot ==
Two children, Birgitta and Jan, go on adventures in a troll-forest. They visit Santa's workshop, meet Mrs. Claus and watch Christmas preparation. Birgitta and Jan return to the workshop every day, hoping to meet Santa Claus. Every time, he's out on a mission. They'll not meet him until Christmas Eve.
