= En småstad vid seklets början =

- Also known as: En jul för 50 år sedan
- Genre: children
- Country of origin: Sweden
- Original language: Swedish
- No. of seasons: 1
- No. of episodes: 28

Production
- Production company: Sveriges Radio-TV

Original release
- Network: SVT
- Release: 27 November – 24 December 1966

Related
- Farbror Pekkas handelsbod (1965); Gumman som blev liten som en tesked (1967)

En småstad vid seklets början ('A Small Town at the Beginning of the Century') is the Sveriges Television's Christmas calendar and Sveriges Radio's Christmas Calendar in 1966. The radio version was called En jul för 50 år sedan ('A Christmas 50 Years Ago').

== Plot ==
The story is set during the 1910s in a port town in central Sweden.
