= Lille Luj och Änglaljus i strumpornas hus =

- Genre: children
- Created by: Staffan Westerberg
- Written by: Staffan Westerberg
- Directed by: Staffan Westerberg
- Country of origin: Sweden
- Original language: Swedish
- No. of seasons: 1
- No. of episodes: 24

Original release
- Network: TV2
- Release: 1 December – 24 December 1983

Related
- lbert & Herberts julkalender (1982); Julstrul med Staffan & Bengt (1984)

Lille Luj och Änglaljus i strumpornas hus ("Lille Luj and Änglaljus in the House of Socks") is the Sveriges Television's Christmas calendar in 1983. It was directed by Staffan Westerberg. and features the two sock puppet characters Lillstrumpa and Syster Yster. A recurring theme was the phrase "Luj dog", which is "God jul" ("Merry Christmas" in Swedish) backwards.
