= Sveriges Television's Christmas calendar =

Swedish children's television series

- Also known as: Sveriges Televisions adventskalender
- Sveriges Televisions julkalender
- Genre: Children
- Country of origin: Sweden
- Original language: Swedish

Original release
- Network: SVT
- Release: 27 November 1960

Swedish Television's Christmas calendar (Swedish: Sveriges Televisions julkalender) previously Swedish Television's Advent calendar (Sveriges Televisions adventskalender) is a Christmas calendar television series mainly for children, broadcast by Sveriges Television (Sweden's national public television broadcaster) since 1960 and has developed into an essential part of contemporary Swedish Christmas tradition.

Every series consists of 24 episodes (with a few exceptions), broadcast daily 1–24 December. The theme for most series have some connection to Christmas. Prior to 1971, it was called Adventskalendern. Sveriges Radio also has a tradition of broadcasting a similar series on the radio each year and prior to 1973, it was always the same series on the radio and on television (with a few differences in adaptation, depending on the medium), but since then, it has been a different series on the radio and on television. In the beginning, the series began on Advent Sunday, but nowadays, it always starts on 1 December; it has always ended on Christmas Eve (24 December). Thus, for instance, the 1967 series Gumman som blev liten som en tesked had only 22 episodes, since the Advent Sunday of that year was 3 December.

Along with each series, there is always the opportunity to buy a paper calendar with a window to open each day. These are available in most Swedish retail outlets, shops, supermarkets etc. and the windows usually contain images of something to do with the plot of that day's episode.

Every series from 1988 onwards has been released on DVD, as well as some series before that. From the 1980s, all but the 1980 and 1987 series have been released. From the 1960s, the 1967 and 1969 series are available and from the 1970s, the 1972, 1973, 1974, 1977, 1978 and 1979 series are available. Until 2011, the older series were released by Pan Vision, but from 2012, distribution has been taken over by Scanbox Entertainment. There are usually two or three new series releases in the autumn each year.

== List ==
| Year | Title | English translation | DVD release date | Notes |
|---|---|---|---|---|
| 1960 | Titteliture | Titteliture | TBA | The premiere was on 27 November (Advent Sunday) and not 1 December, but the series still contained 24 episodes, since Swedish Television did not broadcast on Wednesdays at this time. |
| 1961 | Julbåten Juliana | The Christmas Boat Juliana | TBA | |
| 1962 | Tomtefamiljen i Storskogen | The Santa Claus Family in the Big Woods | TBA | |
| 1963 | Den tänkande brevbäraren | The Thinking Postman | TBA | This calendar is also known as Brevbäraren vid TV-gatan (The Mailman on Television Street; in radio, it was called Brevbäraren vid Radiogränd [The Mailman in Radio Alley]) and the mailman was played by Stig Grybe. |
| 1964 | Lill-Stina på reportage i Storskogen | Little Stina on report in the Big Woods | TBA | |
| 1965 | Farbror Pekkas handelsbod | Uncle Pekka's Shop | TBA | The at the time very popular Pekka Langer had a shop in the woods. |
| 1966 | En småstad vid seklets början | A Small Town at the Beginning of the Century. | TBA | In radio, it was called En jul för 50 år sedan (A Christmas 50 years ago) and it was set just before World War I. |
| 1967 | Gumman som blev liten som en tesked | The Little Old Lady who Became as Small as a Teaspoon | 21 October 2009 | Birgitta Andersson played Teskedsgumman (Mrs. Pepperpot) and Carl-Gustaf Lindstedt played her husband. The series began on 3 December (Advent Sunday), so there were only 22 episodes and not 24. In 1973 there were new episodes made in colour. This series was simply called Teskedsgumman, but it was not a Christmas calendar. |
| 1968 | Klart spår till Tomteboda | All Aboard for Tomteboda | TBA | |
| 1969 | Herkules Jonssons storverk | The Labours of Hercules Jonsson | 26 October 2006 | The boy Herkules Jonsson was played by James Dickson, while his dad "Bara Jonsson" was played by Tage Danielsson, who also wrote and produced the series. This was the first time the calendar was made in colour. The series contained 25 episodes instead of 24, since it began on 30 November (Advent Sunday). |
| 1970 | Regnbågslandet | The Rainbow Land | TBA | |
| 1971 | Broster, Broster! | Broster, Broster! | TBA | The series concerned a family, expecting a new family member at Christmas. As the other children in the family did not know whether they would have a brother or a sister, they combined the two words into "broster". |
| 1972 | Barnen i Höjden | The Children in the Heights | 23 oktober 2013 | |
| 1973 | Mumindalen | Moominvalley | 26 October 2005 | This was the first time the calendar was broadcast on Swedish Channel 2, which not everyone in the country could watch at the time. This was also the first time there were different calendars in radio and on television. |
| 1974 | Rulle på Rullseröd | Rulle at Rullseröd | 24 October 2012 | |
| 1975 | Långtradarchaufförens berättelser | The Lorry Driver's Stories | TBA | Beppe Wolgers played the lorry driver, who was told various stories by hitchhikers. |
| 1976 | Gumman som blev liten som en tesked | The Little Old Lady who Became as Small as a Teaspoon | 21 October 2009 | Rerun from 1967. |
| 1977 | Fem myror är fler än fyra elefanter | Five Ants Are More than Four Elephants | 26 November 2008 | The original series was broadcast in 1973 and 1975. This series contained parts from the original one, with sequences of "window opening" with the three main characters Magnus, Brasse and Eva added. The windows of the calendar were not numbered, but had letters on them. Since each episode concerned one of the letters of the Swedish alphabet, this calendar had 28 episodes and therefore started on 27 November (which happened to be Advent Sunday). The window openings and parts of the episodes themselves are included in the DVD box with the original series. |
| 1978 | Julius Julskötare | Julius, the Christmas Caretaker | 23 oktober 2013 | Björn Skifs played Julius. |
| 1979 | Trolltider | Troll Times | 19 November 2001 | Birgitta Andersson and Eva Rydberg played the main characters, two trolls. |
| 1980 | Det blir jul på Möllegården | Christmas on the Mölle Farm | TBA | |
| 1981 | Stjärnhuset | The Star House | 26 October 2011 | Sif Ruud told Johannes Brost about Greek mythology. |
| 1982 | Albert & Herberts julkalender | Albert & Herbert's Advent Calendar | 23 October 2002 | A Christmas spin-off from Albert & Herbert, which in turn, was a Swedish remake of the British series Steptoe and Son. |
| 1983 | Lille Luj och Änglaljus i strumpornas hus | Little Eluy and Angel Light in the House of Stockings | 26 October 2011 | Staffan Westerberg made this calendar where his figures of Lillstrumpa och Syster Yster (Little Sock and Sister Skittish) turned up for the first time. |
| 1984 | Julstrul med Staffan & Bengt | Christmas Troubles with Staffan & Bengt | 24 October 2007 | |
| 1985 | Trolltider med trollkalender | Troll Times with the Troll Calendar | 19 November 2001 | Rerun from 1979. |
| 1986 | Julpussar och stjärnsmällar | Christmas Kisses and Star Explosions | 20 October 2010 | |
| 1987 | Marias barn | Mary's Child | TBA | |
| 1988 | Liv i luckan med julkalendern | Life in the [Calendar] Window with the Advent Calendar | 31 oktober 2012 | |
| 1989 | T. Sventon praktiserande privatdetektiv | T. Sventon, Consulting Detective | 26 October 2005 | |
| 1990 | Kurt Olssons julkalender | Kurt Olsson's Advent Calendar | 20 October 2004 | |
| 1991 | Sunes jul | Sune's Christmas | 20 October 2004 | Also had a spin-off in the 1993 film Sune's Summer. |
| 1992 | Klasses julkalender | Klasse's Advent Calendar | 21 October 2009 | This is the only time the Calendar has been broadcasten live, since people could make phone calls to it. The episodes were unusually long (30 minutes) and it began on 29 November (Advent Sunday), so there were 26 episodes all in all. |
| 1993 | Tomtemaskinen | The Santa Machine | 19 November 2001 | |
| 1994 | Håll huvet kallt | Keep Your Head Cool | 20 October 2010 | |
| 1995 | Jul i Kapernaum | Christmas in Capernaum | 27 October 2006 | Each episode consisted of two parts – one with a continuous adventure played by actors and one with free standing episodes with puppets. The entire series was published on VHS, but the DVD edition only contains the continuous adventure. |
| 1996 | Mysteriet på Greveholm | The Mystery at Greveholm | 19 November 2001 | This was the first Christmas calendar that had its own website. |
| 1997 | Pelle Svanslös | Peter No-Tail | 19 November 2001 | This series had a spin-off in the movie Pelle Svanslös och den stora sKattjakten (Peter No-Tail and the Big Treasure Hunt) in 2000, where the K in "sKattjakten" is capitalised as a note to the fact that all the characters are cats (Swedish "katt"). |
| 1998 | När karusellerna sover | When the Carousels Sleep | 27 October 2006 | It was filmed in Liseberg |
| 1999 | Julens hjältar | The Heroes of Christmas | 19 November 2001 | |
| 2000 | Ronny & Julia | Ronny & Julia | 27 October 2006 | |
| 2001 | Kaspar i Nudådalen | Caspar in the Now-Then-Valley | 24 October 2002 | |
| 2002 | Dieselråttor & sjömansmöss | Diesel Rats and Sailor Mice | 22 October 2003 | |
| 2003 | Håkan Bråkan | Håkan the Trouble Maker | 20 October 2004 | This series had a spin-off in the movie Håkan Bråkan & Josef in 2004. |
| 2004 | Allrams höjdarpaket | Allram's Hit Parcel | 25 November 2005 | The main characters Allram Eest and Tjet (two puppets) made their debut in the series Allra mest tecknat in 2002. |
| 2005 | En decemberdröm | A December Dream | 27 October 2006 | |
| 2006 | LasseMajas detektivbyrå | LasseMaja's Detective Agency | 7 February 2007 | This was the first Christmas calendar broadcast in HDTV (720p). It had a spin-off in the movie LasseMajas detektivbyrå – Kameleontens hämnd in 2008. |
| 2007 | En riktig jul | A Proper Christmas | 21 November 2008 | |
| 2008 | Skägget i brevlådan | The Beard in the Mailbox | 21 October 2009 | |
| 2009 | Superhjältejul | Superhero Christmas | 20 October 2010 | The main characters Supersnällasilversara and Stålhenrik made their debut in Swedish Television's children's show Bolibompa and then had their own series Supersnällasilversara och Stålhenrik in 2004. |
| 2010 | Hotell Gyllene knorren | The Golden Twist Hotel | 26 January 2011 | This series also had a spin-off in the movie Hotell Gyllene Knorren – Filmen in 2011. |
| 2011 | Tjuvarnas jul | The Thieves' Christmas | 14 November 2012 | |
| 2012 | Mysteriet på Greveholm: Grevens återkomst | Mystery at Greveholm: Return of the Count | 13 February 2013 | This series is a sequel from the 1996 years Christmas calendar, Mysteriet på Greveholm. |
| 2013 | Barna Hedenhös uppfinner julen | The Hedenhös Children Invent Christmas | 5 November 2014 | This series is based on the books by children's author Bertil Almqvist |
| 2014 | Piratskattens hemlighet | The Secret of the Pirate Treasure | 5 October 2015 | This series was filmed in Croatia, becoming the first Sveriges Television's Christmas calendar program to be mostly filmed outside of Sweden. |
| 2015 | Tusen år till julafton | A Thousand Years until Christmas Eve | TBA | |
| 2016 | Selmas saga | Selma's Story | 2 October 2017 | |
| 2017 | Jakten på tidskristallen | Hunt for the time crystal | TBA | |
| 2018 | Storm på Lugna gatan | Storm at Calm street | 7 October 2019 | |
| 2019 | Panik i tomteverkstan | Panic in Santa's Workshop | 7 December 2020 | |
| 2020 | Mirakel | Miracle | 4 October 2021 | |
| 2021 | En hederlig jul med Knyckertz | An Honest Christmas with Knyckertz | 24 October 2022 | |
| 2022 | Kronprinsen som försvann | The Crown Prince who disappeared | TBA | |
| 2023 | Trolltider – legenden om Bergatrollet | Troll Times - the legend of the mountain troll | 4 November 2024 | Reboot of the 1979 Sveriges Television's Christmas calendar. |
| 2024 | Snödrömmar | Snow Dreams | TBA | |
| 2025 | Tidstjuven | The Time Thief | TBA | |
| Year | Title | English translation | DVD release date | Notes |

== See also ==
- Jullovsmorgon
- Sommarlovsmorgon
- Sveriges Radio's Christmas Calendar
