= Are U 4 Real? =

2001 novel by Sara Kadefors

- Cover of the 2001 Swedish version
- Author: Sara Kadefors
- Original title: Sandor slash Ida
- Language: Swedish
- Genre: Young adult fiction
- Publisher: Penguin Group (English version)
- Publication date: 2001 (Sweden); 14 May 2009 (US)
- Publication place: Sweden
- ISBN: 978-91-7001-283-9 (Swedish version); ISBN 978-0-8037-3276-6 (English version)
- OCLC: 186648566

Are U 4 Real? (Swedish: Sandor slash Ida) is a Swedish young adult book written by Sara Kadefors. It was originally written as a script for a television drama, but after a Swedish television network turned it down, Kadefors got Bonnier Carlsen to publish it as a book in 2001. On 7 April 2009 it was revealed that the book would be released in the United States on 14 May 2009 with a new title, Are U 4 Real? The book is about a girl named Ida who lives in Stockholm and a boy named Sandor who lives in Gothenburg. The two sixteen-year-olds meet for the first time on an Internet chat room, where they eventually fall in love with each other. However, everything goes wrong when Sandor decides to visit Ida in Stockholm.

== Plot ==
Ida is exactly the opposite of the girls Sandor usually talks to in real life. She is an attractive girl from Stockholm who likes to party, while he is a shy boy from Gothenburg who likes to dance ballet. The two first meet in an Internet chat room, where they share their feelings and become close friends. Sandor and Ida eventually fall in love with each other. However, everything goes wrong when Sandor decides to visit Ida in Stockholm.

== Publication history ==
Sandor slash Ida was originally written by Sara Kadefors as a television drama. However, when she pitched the idea to the Swedish television network Sveriges Television, they turned it down. Kadefors therefore tried to get it published as a book, and in 2001 she got it published by Bonnier Carlsen. On 7 April 2009 it was revealed that the book would be published in the United States by Penguin Group on 14 May 2009. Several changes have been made to the English adaptation of the book. Ida's name has been changed to Kyla and Sandor's has been changed to Alex. The book is no longer set in Sweden; Stockholm has been replaced by Los Angeles and Gothenburg by San Francisco. Several parts of the book regarding Ida's sexual experiences have also been removed or censored. Kadefors said she was insulted by the changes, "it's like if the book wasn't good enough, and [Ida's] experiences with sex and alcohol explains why she reacts the ways she does in the book." The book's translator explained that if the book had contained "too much sex" it would have been difficult to sell to stores.

== Reception ==
The episode has received multiple awards. In 2001, it won the prestigious Augustpriset (English: August Award) in the "Best Children-Youth Book" category. It won the Pocketpriset (English: Pocket Award) for being the most sold children's book in 2001. It is one of the most common books for Swedish children between the ages of twelve and fifteen to read during their primary education in Swedish schools. Other common books include Lord of the Flies and Vinterviken.

=== Film adaptation ===
A film adaptation of the book was released in Sweden on 4 February 2005. It was written by Kadefors and directed by Henrik Georgsson, Kadefors's husband. The film won an award at the Gothenburg Film Festival, where it premiered. The film also won a Guldbagge Award.
