= Ketnet Hits =

Belgian radio station

Ketnet Hits (formerly Ketnet Radio) is the youth radio station of Ketnet, the youth channel of VRT. Ketnet Hits was founded as a rival to Radio BEMBEM, a partnership between the VMMa and Studio 100. The radio was founded under the name Ketnet Radio, in 2011 this changed to Ketnet Hits. Its broadcast consists of music and only one program: Ketnet Hits Top 10.
