= Sveriges Radio P4 =

Sweden
- Broadcast area: Sweden; Åland

Programming
- Languages: Swedish; Finnish
- Format: Local radio, AC, Music, Sports, Talk&News

Ownership
- Owner: Sveriges Radio

History
- First air date: 1987

Links
- Website: SR P4

P4 (pe fyra) is a national radio channel produced by the Swedish public broadcaster Sveriges Radio. P4 was started in 1987 as a network of regional stations, but national programming was added in 1993 when P3 was relaunched as a specialist youth channel and P4 took over a large part of P3's former programming intended for a more adult audience. Music programme is more or less similar to BBC Radio 2.

== Programming ==
Targeted at an across-the-board audience, but with the emphasis on middle-aged (40+) listeners, it is the corporation's most popular radio channel, presenting popular music, entertainment, and sport. On weekdays most of the daytime schedule comes from 25 different regional stations, each producing programming (including local news coverage) for their own areas, while in the evenings and at weekends the channel carries national programming. Overnight (between 0.00 and 6.00) P4 and youth channel P3 present a joint programme of "music, games, and chat".

Among the more popular programmes broadcast nationally are: Karlavagnen, Melodikrysset, Ring så spelar vi, Sportextra and Svensktoppen.

== Regional stations ==
The 25 regional stations are:

- SR Blekinge
- SR Dalarna
- SR Gotland
- SR Gävleborg
- SR Göteborg
- SR Halland
- SR Jämtland
- SR Jönköping
- SR Kalmar
- SR Kristianstad
- SR Kronoberg
- SR Malmö
- SR Norrbotten
- SR Sjuhärad
- SR Skaraborg
- SR Stockholm
- SR Sörmland
- SR Uppland
- SR Värmland
- SR Väst
- SR Västerbotten
- SR Västernorrland
- SR Västmanland
- SR Örebro
- SR Östergötland

== National presenters ==
- Åsa Avdic
- Ulf Elfving
- Anders Eldeman
- Patrik Ehrnst
- Pär Fontander
- Jenny Goldkuhl
- Gunnar Gramnes
- Paul Haukka
- Annika Jankell
- Bosse Löthén
- Sanna Martin
- Carolina Norén
- Henrik Olsson
- Rickard Olsson
- Bosse Pettersson
- Marika Rennerfelt
- Hans Rosenfeldt
- Jesper J Rubin
- Peter Sundberg
- Lisa Syrén
- Susanne Tellinger
- Tomas Tengby
- Andreas Tosting
- Stefan Wermelin
