= Sveriges Radio P3 =

Swedish national youth radio station

- Sweden
- Broadcast area: Sweden; Åland
- Frequency: 92.0–101.7 MHz

Programming
- Language: Swedish
- Format: Contemporary hit radio, CHR Alternative

Ownership
- Owner: Sveriges Radio
- Sister stations: SR P3 Star

History
- First air date: 1 July 1964

Links
- Website: sr.se/p3

P3 (pe tre) is a semi-mainstream CHR/CHR Alternative-formatted station operated by Sweden's national publicly funded radio broadcasting organization Sveriges Radio. The P in P3 originally stood for Program (Programme) but today has no official meaning and is simply a name. P3 was officially similar and related to BBC Radio 1.

P3 is broadcast nationwide on FM (also digitally via DAB in Stockholm, Gothenburg, Malmö, and Luleå) as well as being streamed on the internet. It also operated the web- and DAB-only channel P3 Star until June 2019.

== History ==
Test broadcastings were introduced in 1962. On 1 July 1964, Sveriges Radio P3 began regular operations.

== Format ==
Its output (pop, rock, hip-hop and dance) is oriented towards young people from junior high school age to 50. The station claims that it plays 1,200 different songs every week and at least 1/3 of them are Swedish. It also welcomes musical suggestions from listeners and records from unsigned/independent artists.

== Current programmes ==
- DigiListan is a Sunday afternoon two-hour programme presenting the most streamed, downloaded and bought songs in Sweden during the week.
- Morgonpasset i P3 is a daily breakfast show consisting of a mix of music, interviews, and humour.
- Musikguiden i P3 is a Friday morning three-hour radio show dedicated to all kinds of music.
- P3 Osignat is a Thursday night one-hour radio show featuring the 10 most voted new and unsigned songs.
- P3 Soul is a weekly radio show dedicated to soul and hip hop music. It has been hosted since 1978 by Mats Nileskär, who was the first ever presenter to play hip hop on Swedish radio.
- PP3 is a Friday afternoon three-hour radio show dedicated to pop culture. It has been hosted since April 2016 by Linnéa Wikblad, Sara Kinberg and Adrian Boberg.
- Vaken med P3 & P4 is the daily six-hour overnight show. It is a simulcast with SR P4.
- P3 Nyheter is a two-minute news summary, broadcasting Mondays to Fridays between 6.30 AM and 6.00 PM. At all other times, Ekot is in charge of the news coverage.
- "Relationsradion i P3" is a relationship-related music-and-speech show that broadcasts Monday to Thursday at 10:02-13:00.

As well as its music programming, P3 also provides a traffic message channel service.
