= Children's radio =

Radio programme aimed at children

Children's radio is a term used to refer to both radio series and formats designed specifically for children. It has existed as far back as the beginning of broadcasting in the 1920s, and survives in the present day, even if not as prominent.

== History ==
The earliest children's radio broadcasts occurred in 1921 in the United States and 1922 in the United Kingdom. Other countries, including Norway, Sweden, Australia and Japan would follow suit.

=== By country ===
==== United States ====
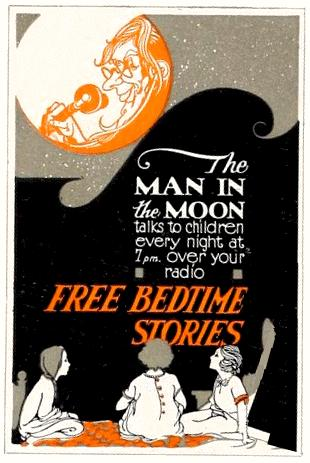
Man in the Moon stories are believed to be the first American regular broadcasts aimed at children.

The first US radio broadcasts of material written for children is thought to have been the Man in the Moon stories by Josephine Lawrence. This was first aired around October 1921, on WJZ Newark (now known as WABC) and consisted of fairy tales told by William F.B. McNeary. These started off a wave of similar series, hosted by various “Aunties” and “Uncles”, aired around both the 5pm-6pm and Saturday morning timeslots. From the 1930s however, adventure serials such as Little Orphan Annie, Jack Armstrong, the All-American Boy and Captain Midnight became the main attraction; though fairytale re-enactments such as those from Let's Pretend continued to be popular.

By the 1950s and 1960s, television had largely replaced radio as the predominant medium of children’s entertainment; a resurgence began in the mid-1980s with WNYC's Kids America, the only nationally networked children’s radio series available at that time until Radio AAHS expanded from 1992. These were mainly made up of music, games and jokes, and AAHS would only be halted following a disastrous deal with The Walt Disney Company that led to the creation of Radio Disney in 1996. Radio Disney would remain the only dominant network for two decades (barring those of satellites) until its closure in 2021.

==== United Kingdom ====
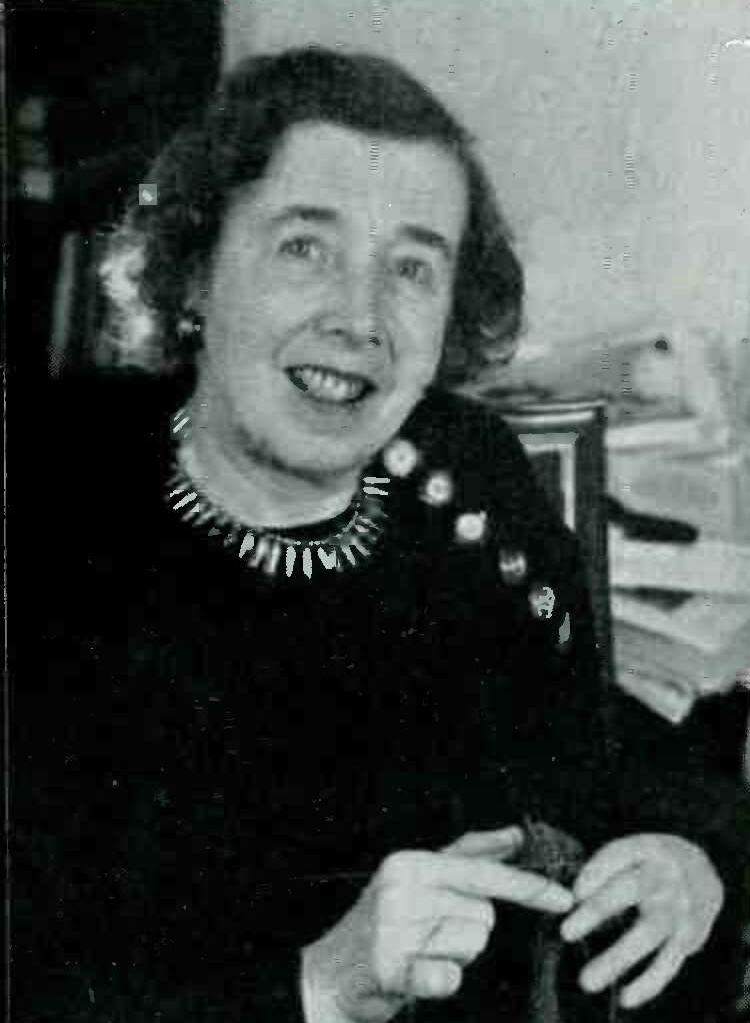
May Jenkin was responsible for bringing S.G. Hulme Beaman’s Toytown stories to Children's Hour.

Cecil Lewis, L. Stanton Jefferies, Rex Palmer and Arthur Burrows founded Children's Hour at the BBC in 1922, broadcast from 5-6pm. Originally run quite haphazardly, it would eventually become more organised, paving the way for a variety of programming: plays (the best known being regular features such as Toytown, Norman and Henry Bones and Jennings at School), talks by Stephen King-Hall and nature explorations including Zoo Man. These were sometimes populated with “Aunties” and “Uncles”, most notably Derek McCulloch, or “Uncle Mac”. 1954 saw the beginning of Children's Favourites, a programme dedicated to music. In 1964 Frank Gillard closed Children's Hour, replacing it with Story Time, which ended in 1967, while Favourites persevered into the 1970s and 1980s as Junior Choice.

One series that lasted from the 1950s to the 1980s was Listen with Mother, aimed at a younger audience and consisting of nursery rhymes and stories. It was eventually succeeded by CBeebies Radio in 2007, originally broadcast on BBC Radio 7 before transferring to the internet and a station on the BBC Sounds app. In 2005, a digital radio station known as Fun Kids was opened, lasting into the present day.

==== Norway ====
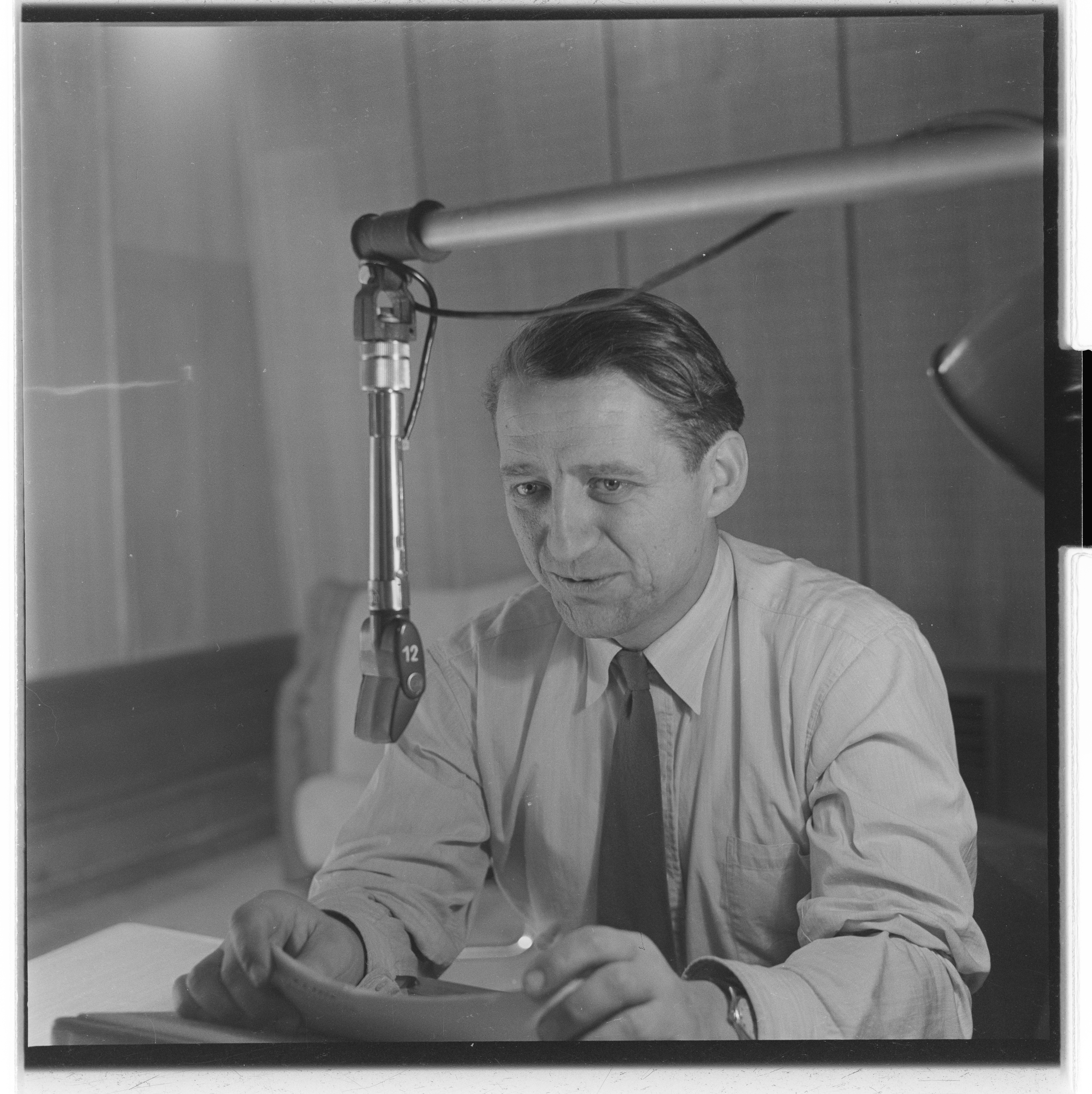
Thorbjørn Egner was responsible for Lørdagsbarnetimen’s legendary lyrics: “Now comes the children's hour (hush, hush, hush, be quiet as a mouse)”

1924 marked the beginning of Lørdagsbarnetimen ("The Saturday Children's Hour"), aired every Saturday until 2010, except for a period during World War II. Following said period, it was reinvented by Lauritz Johnson, who became Uncle Lauritz, presenting alongside Sonni Holtedahl Larsen (as Aunt Sonni). Perhaps the most well-known items of the series were Stompa, a Norwegian adaptation of the UK’s Jennings at School, and Barnetimeboka ("Children's Hour Book"), an original series involving an author writing the first chapter of a story finished by young listeners. By the 1950s, 98% of the country’s children were regularly listening to the programme.

==== Sweden ====
Barnens brevlåda ("The Children's Letterbox") first aired in 1925, and by the time it ended in 1972, its 1,785 episodes made it the world’s longest-running radio series, later superseded by the Swedish series Smoke Rings. It was broadcast by Sveriges Radio, who would go on to create many other shows, including Nicke Lilltroll, Vi i femman, and Gusten Grodslukare.

==== Australia ====
Australian children’s radio first appeared around the late 1920s. Performances of the Toytown stories were aired every Thursday, but in 1933 the country received one of its best-remembered original features: the Argonauts Club. First running until 1934, it was revived in 1941 and continued until 1972. It was, in many ways, similar to the UK’s Children's Hour, consisting of plays, music and talks, one of the best known being Ruth Park's The Muddle-Headed Wombat. Like Toytown, it only ended when the Argonauts Club itself closed in 1972. Due to fear of air raids during World War II, ABC Radio created Kindergarten of the Air in 1943, which remained popular after the war and into the 1960s.

==== Japan ====
In Japan, Children's Time was first broadcast in 1925 by NHK, and would continue through multiple name changes until 1972. Infant Time, which continues to this day, was first broadcast in 1927 on NHK (albeit irregularly). It would become more organised from 1933, and consists of nursery rhymes and stories for preschoolers.

During the 1950s and 1960s, The Tale of the New Countries would present stories by Toshio Kitamura, including Swan Knight and The Boy Who Plays the Flute. Another well-known long-running series was the music programme Pippo Pippo Bonbon, which ran from 1964 to 1981. More recent ventures include Storytelling Journey, A-I-Ko-To-Ba and Listen to the Egg!.

== Currently-operating stations ==
Branding	Callsign	Frequency	Broadcast area	Owner
Kids Dot Radio		web	United States & Canada	Kids.Radio Inc
Kids Place Live		78 (Sirius and XM)	United States & Canada	Sirius XM Radio
KIDJAM!	WAPS-HD3	91.3-3	Akron, Ohio, United States	Akron Public Schools
The Arrow	WMDR	1340	Augusta, Maine, United States	Life of Light Ministries, LLC
Ketnet Hits		web	Belgium	VRT
ČRo Rádio Junior		DAB	Czech Republic	Český rozhlas
Mon petit France Inter		web	France	Radio France
MDR Tweens		DAB	Germany	ARD (MDR)
Toggo Radio		DAB	Germany	RTL Group
WDR Maus		DAB	Germany	ARD (WDR)
Csukás Meserádió		DAB	Hungary	MRTV
RTÉ Kids Radio		web	Ireland	RTÉ
Rai Radio Kids		DAB	Italia	RAI
Vaikų Radijas		94.9	Lithuania	Vaikų Radijas
NRK Super		web	Norway	NRK
Polskie Radio Dzieciom		DAB	Poland	Polskie Radio
RTP Zig Zag		web	Portugal	RTP
Rádio Junior		web	Slovakia	STVR
Radioapans Knattekanal		web	Sweden	Sveriges Radio
CBeebies Radio		web	United Kingdom	BBC
Fun Kids		DAB	London, United Kingdom	Folder Media
ABC Kids Listen		DAB, web	Australia	ABC

== See also ==
- List of children radio networks
