= Deaths in December 2016 =

The following is a list of notable deaths in December 2016.

Entries for each day are listed alphabetically by surname. A typical entry lists information in the following sequence:

- Name, age, country of citizenship at birth, subsequent country of citizenship (if applicable), reason for notability, cause of death (if known), and reference.

== December 2016 ==
=== 1 ===
- Brent Ashabranner, 95, American Peace Corps administrator and author.
- Sulabha Brahme, 84, Indian economist.
- Don Calfa, 76, American actor (The Return of the Living Dead, Weekend at Bernie's, Me, Myself and I).
- Elisabeth Carron, 94, American operatic soprano.
- Jacques Cohen, 86, Egyptian-born Israeli actor (HaMis'ada HaGdola), complications from pneumonia.
- Peter Corrigan, 75, Australian architect.
- Patricia Crampton, 90, English translator.
- Gérard Desrosiers, 97, Canadian physician.
- Jo-Anna Downey, 50, Canadian comedian, amyotrophic lateral sclerosis.
- Inkulab, 72, Indian poet and political activist.
- Bor-ming Jahn, 76, Taiwanese geochemist.
- Helen Ketola, 85, American baseball player (AAGPBL).
- Edward U. Knowlton, 83, American politician.
- Barry Lloyd, 63, Welsh cricketer (Glamorgan).
- Joe McKnight, 28, American football player (New York Jets), shot.
- Ljubo Sirc, 96, Slovene economist.
- Ousmane Sow, 81, Senegalese sculptor.
- Kirstie Tancock, 27, British organ donation campaigner.
- Zekarias Yohannes, 91, Eritrean Catholic hierarch, Bishop of Asmara (1984–2001).

=== 2 ===
- Odeefuo Boa Amponsem III, 94, Ghanaian royal, King of Denkyira (since 1955).
- Coral Atkins, 80, English actress (A Family at War, Emmerdale), cancer.
- Lyle Bouck, 92, American military officer and war veteran (Battle of the Bulge), pneumonia.
- H. Keith H. Brodie, 77, American psychiatrist and educator, President of Duke University (1985–1993).
- Joan Chalmers, 88, Canadian philanthropist.
- Billy Chapin, 72, American child actor (The Night of the Hunter).
- Cherushii, 33, American electronic musician and radio host (KALX), injuries from fire.
- Paul de Wispelaere, 88, Belgian writer.
- Dejo Fayemi, 83, Nigerian footballer (national team).
- Barry Frank, 86, American pop singer (Sammy Kaye Orchestra).
- Mark Gray, 64, American country singer and songwriter (Take Me Down, The Closer You Get).
- Halvar Jonson, 75, Canadian politician, Alberta MLA (1982–2004).
- Sammy Lee, 96, American diver, Olympic champion (1948, 1952), pneumonia.
- Daryl MacDonald, 82, Canadian Olympic rower.
- Ko. Si. Mani, 87, Indian politician.
- Gisela May, 92, German actress and singer (Berliner Ensemble).
- James Reiss, 75, American poet and novelist.
- Teri Rofkar, 60, American Tlingit weaver.
- Rocco Salini, 85, Italian politician, President of Abruzzo (1990–1992).
- Jean Stead, 90, British journalist (The Guardian).
- Bosco Tjan, 50, American professor and psychologist, stabbed.
- Tove Kari Viken, 74, Norwegian politician, MP (1989–1997).
- Russ Witte, 99, American swimmer.

=== 3 ===
- Harry Balk, 91, American record producer and record company executive.
- Yvon Becaus, 80, Belgian Olympic boxer.
- Willie Casey, 84, Irish Gaelic football player (Mayo).
- Dave Cropper, 70, British Olympic athlete.
- Susan Cummings, 86, German-born American actress, cardiogenic shock.
- Newman Darby, 88, American sailboard inventor.
- Gigliola Frazzoni, 93, Italian opera singer.
- Nikola Gigov, 79, Bulgarian author.
- Herbert Hardesty, 91, American jazz musician.
- Sir David Hay, 88, New Zealand cardiologist, anti-smoking campaigner.
- Bola Kuforiji-Olubi, 80, Nigerian businesswoman and politician.
- Arthur Latham, 86, British politician, MP for Paddington North (1969–1974) and Paddington (1974–1979), Leader of London Borough of Havering (1990–1996).
- Bengt Lindqvist, 80, Swedish politician, MP (1982–1995).
- Bhai Mahavir, 94, Indian politician, Governor of Madhya Pradesh (1998–2003).
- Nancy Mairs, 73, American writer.
- Brockway McMillan, 101, American government official and scientist, Director of the National Reconnaissance Office (1963–1965).
- Antonio Membrado, 81, Spanish classical guitarist.
- Donald Pack, 96, British mathematician.
- Rémy Pflimlin, 62, French businessman, CEO of France Télévisions, cancer.
- Anthony Reeve, 70, British picture restorer, complications from motor neuron disease.
- Maisie Ringham, 92, British trombonist.
- Leonard B. Sand, 88, American judge.
- Bekal Utsahi, 92, Indian poet and politician, MP (1986–1992), brain haemorrhage.

=== 4 ===
- Gideon Applegate, 89, American baseball player (New York Black Yankees).
- Hiroshi Arakawa, 86, Japanese baseball player (Mainichi Orions), batting coach (Yomiuri Giants) and manager (Yakult Swallows), cardiac arrest.
- Byron Birdsall, 78, American watercolor painter, heart failure.
- Lady Moyra Browne, 98, British nursing administrator.
- Tadeusz Chmielewski, 89, Polish film director, screenwriter and producer.
- Leonard T. Connors, 87, American politician, member of the New Jersey Senate (1982–2008).
- Kamarou Fassassi, 68, Beninese politician, Minister of Mines, Energy and Hydraulics (2001–2006).
- Julia Gomelskaya, 52, Ukrainian composer, traffic collision.
- Gotlib, 82, French comics artist (Gai-Luron, Les Dingodossiers, La Rubrique-à-Brac).
- Maurice Graffen, 92, French Olympic sprint canoeist.
- Ferreira Gullar, 86, Brazilian writer, essayist and art critic, pneumonia.
- Radim Hladík, 69, Czech musician (Blue Effect), pulmonary fibrosis.
- Peter Latham, 91, British air vice marshal.
- Stu Locklin, 88, American baseball player (Cleveland Indians).
- Larry Muhoberac, 79, American musician and record producer.
- Jean-Loup Passek, 80, French film critic.
- Richard Purtill, 85, American philosopher and author.
- Patricia Robins, 95, British novelist.
- Jack Rudin, 92, American real estate developer.
- Bill Ryusaki, 80, American martial artist, stuntman and actor (Being John Malkovich, Big Trouble in Little China, Rambo: First Blood Part II).
- John Swaab, 88, Dutch Olympic equestrian
- Margaret Whitton, 67, American actress (Major League, The Secret of My Success, Steaming), cancer.
- Tiina Wilén-Jäppinen, 53, Finnish politician, shot.

=== 5 ===
- Charles H. Belzile, 83, Canadian army general. Commander of the Canadian Army (1992–1996).
- Big Syke, 48, American rapper.
- Mogens Camre, 80, Danish politician, MP (1968–1987) and MEP (1999–2009).
- Geydar Dzhemal, 69, Russian Islamic revolutionist and activist.
- Julia Elena Fortún, 87, Bolivian anthropologist.
- Petros Fyssoun, 83, Greek actor.
- J. Jayalalithaa, 68, Indian politician and actress, Chief Minister of Tamil Nadu (1991–1996, 2001, 2002–2006, 2011–2014, since 2015), heart attack.
- Kenichi Kurosawa, 48, Japanese musician, brain tumor.
- Mona Meraachli, 58, Lebanese singer, heart attack.
- Marcel Renaud, 90, French canoeist, Olympic silver medalist (1956).
- Lodovico Nava, 87, Italian Olympic equestrian.
- Larry Roberts, 53, American football player (San Francisco 49ers).
- Rashaan Salaam, 42, American football player (Chicago Bears), Heisman Trophy winner (1994), suicide by gunshot.
- Rodney Smith, 68, American photographer.
- Robert Sumner, 94, American Baptist pastor and author.
- Sfiso Ncwane, 37, South African singer, kidney failure.

=== 6 ===
- Bruno Bayen, 66, French novelist, playwright and theatre director.
- Adolf Burger, 99, Slovak-born Czech typographer, memoirist and Holocaust survivor.
- Robert Byrne, 86, American author.
- Brittany CoxXx, 38, American trans woman and performer.
- Dave Edwards, 76, American football player (Dallas Cowboys), heart illness.
- Lalit Mohan Gandhi, 65, Indian politician, fell from train.
- Jan Frøystein Halvorsen, 88, Norwegian Supreme Court Justice.
- Dave MacLaren, 82, Scottish football player and manager (Plymouth).
- Jacky Morael, 57, Belgian politician.
- Charles B. Reed, 75, American educator, Chancellor of State University System of Florida (1985–1998) and California State University (1998–2012).
- Chonosuke Takagi, 68, Japanese judoka, world champion (1973), heart attack.
- Peter Vaughan, 93, British actor (Game of Thrones, Brazil, The Remains of the Day), epilepsy.
- Jim Vickers, 93, Indian Olympic hurdler (1948).
- Luke Wendon, 90, British Olympic fencer.

=== 7 ===
- Warren Allmand, 84, Canadian politician, member of the House of Commons of Canada (1965–1997) and Cabinet minister (1972–1979).
- Brian Bulless, 83, English footballer (Hull City).
- Ian Cartwright, 52, English footballer (Wolverhampton), renal and spinal cancer.
- Viktor Danilov, 89, Russian-born Belarusian Greek-Catholic priest and Soviet dissident.
- Paul Elvstrøm, 88, Danish yachtsman, Olympic champion (1948, 1952, 1956, 1960).
- Mohamed Tahar Fergani, 88, Algerian singer.
- Hildegard Hamm-Brücher, 95, German politician.
- Hui Yin-fat, 80, Hong Kong social worker and politician, MLC (1985–1995), MEC (1991–1992) and member of the PLC (1996–1998).
- Junaid Jamshed, 52, Pakistani musician, television personality and preacher, plane crash.
- Alex Johnstone, 55, Scottish politician, MSP for North East Scotland (since 1999), cancer.
- Mike Kelly, 74, American politician, member of the Alaska House of Representatives (2005–2011), plane crash.
- Phillip Knightley, 87, Australian journalist.
- Greg Lake, 69, English singer and musician (King Crimson, Emerson, Lake & Palmer), cancer.
- ORFN, 42, American artist, melanoma.
- Martin Puhvel, 82, Estonian-born Canadian philologist.
- Cho Ramaswamy, 82, Indian actor (Aarilirunthu Arubathu Varai) and lawyer, heart attack.
- Mick Roche, 73, Irish hurler (Tipperary).
- Helen Roseveare, 91, British Christian missionary.
- Romilly Squire of Rubislaw, 63, Scottish heraldic artist.
- Elliott Schwartz, 80, American composer.
- İsmet Sezgin, 88, Turkish politician, Deputy Prime Minister and Minister of National Defence (1997–1999), multiple organ failure.
- Allan Stewart, 74, Scottish politician, MP for East Renfrewshire (1979–1983), Eastwood (1983–1997).
- Adrianne Tolsch, 78, American comedian, esophageal cancer.
- Benny Woit, 88, Canadian ice hockey player (Detroit Red Wings).

=== 8 ===
- Richard E. Aaron, 67, American music photographer, kidney disease.
- John Badham, 79, Canadian sportscaster.
- Joop Braakhekke, 75, Dutch restaurateur and television presenter, pancreatic cancer.
- Putsy Caballero, 89, American baseball player (Philadelphia Phillies).
- Douglas L. Dorset, 75, American crystallographer.
- Valdon Dowiyogo, 48, Nauruan politician, MP (since 2003).
- John Glenn, 95, American astronaut (Mercury-Atlas 6) and politician, U.S. Senator from Ohio (1974–1999).
- Gareth Griffiths, 85, Welsh rugby union player (Cardiff, national team).
- Peter Jackson, 90, British animal conservationist and journalist.
- Lélis Lara, 90, Brazilian Roman Catholic prelate, Bishop of Itabira–Fabriciano (1996–2003).
- Joseph Mascolo, 87, American actor (Days of Our Lives, The Bold and the Beautiful, Jaws 2), complications from Alzheimer's disease.
- Bill Menefee, 95, American basketball coach.
- Peter Messaline, 72, English-born Canadian actor (Doctor Who, Goosebumps, Assassin's Creed Syndicate).
- Thomas C. Oden, 85, American theologian.
- Mark Pinsky, 76, American mathematician.
- Dame Sheila Quinn, 96, British nurse, President of the Royal College of Nursing (1982–1986).
- Aldric Saucier, 80, American scientist and whistleblower.
- Fred Secombe, 97, Welsh priest and writer.
- Sir Alan Urwick, 86, British diplomat and public servant, Ambassador to Egypt (1985–1987), High Commissioner to Canada (1987–1989), Serjeant-at-Arms of the House of Commons (1989–1995).
- Peter van Straaten, 81, Dutch comics artist and political cartoonist (Vader & Zoon).
- Palani Vaughan, 72, American Hawaiian music singer.

=== 9 ===
- Mauro Alanís, 82, Mexican Olympic weightlifter.
- Romualdas Aleliūnas, 57, Lithuanian ceramics designer.
- Élcio Álvares, 84, Brazilian politician, Senator (1991–1994, 1995–1999), Minister of Defence (1999–2000), and Governor of Espírito Santo (1975–1979).
- Edwin Benson, 85, American teacher, last speaker of the Mandan language.
- Georgia Blain, 51, Australian writer, brain cancer.
- Andy Clovechok, 93, Slovak-born Canadian ice hockey player (Vancouver Canucks).
- Lawrence Demmy, 85, British ice dancer, world champion 1952–1955.
- A. Ross Eckler Jr., 89, American logologist, statistician, and author.
- Alejandro González Jr., 23, Mexican bantamweight boxer, shot.
- Richard D. Lawrence, 86, American lieutenant general.
- Sergei Lemeshko, 44, Russian footballer (Zarya Leninsk-Kuznetsky).
- Mario Milano, 81, Italian-born Australian professional wrestler (NWA, WCW, AJPW).
- F. F. Montgomery, 92, American politician.
- Nola Ochs, 105, American centenarian, world's oldest college graduate.
- Luke Owens, 83, American football player (St. Louis Cardinals).
- Jens Risom, 100, Danish-born American furniture designer.
- Franco Rosso, 75, Italian-born British film director (Babylon).
- Robert Scholes, 87, American literary critic and theorist.
- Rob Sherman, 63, American political activist, plane crash.
- Ludwig Siebert, 77, German Olympic bobsledder.
- William N. Small, 89, American admiral.
- P. Viswambharan, 91, Indian politician.
- Ronald Webster, 90, Anguillan politician, Chief Minister (1976–1977, 1980–1984).
- Günther Wilke, 91, German chemist.

=== 10 ===
- George Junus Aditjondro, 70, Indonesian academic and political dissident.
- Stefania Biegun, 81, Polish Olympic cross-country skier.
- Peter Brabrook, 79, English footballer (Chelsea, West Ham United).
- Felix Browder, 89, American mathematician.
- John Cordner, 87, Australian cricket and football player.
- T. Neil Davis, 84, American geophysicist and writer.
- Bill Dineen, 84, Canadian ice hockey player (Detroit Red Wings) and coach.
- Henry Dorsch, 76, Canadian football player (Saskatchewan Roughriders).
- Wolfgang Eisenmenger, 86, German physicist.
- Damião Experiença, 81, Brazilian outsider musician.
- Étienne Fabre, 20, French racing cyclist, fall.
- Jean-Claude Frécon, 72, French politician, Senator from Loire (since 2001).
- James W. Gair, 88, American linguist.
- A. A. Gill, 62, British writer and restaurant critic (The Sunday Times), lung cancer.
- Gene Hamm, 93, American golf player and course designer.
- Shelby Hearon, 85, American author.
- Ken Hechler, 102, American politician, U. S. Representative from West Virginia's 4th congressional district (1959–1977), Secretary of State of West Virginia (1985–2001), stroke.
- Hans-Eric Hellberg, 89, Swedish author (Kram) and journalist.
- Eric Hilton, 83, American hotelier and philanthropist.
- László Huzsvár, 85, Serbian Roman Catholic prelate, Bishop of Zrenjanin (1988–2007).
- Paul Shinichi Itonaga, 88, Japanese Roman Catholic prelate, Bishop of Kagoshima (1969–2005).
- Herm Johnson, 63, American race car driver, liver and renal failure.
- Rick Klassen, 57, Canadian football player (BC Lions), cancer.
- George Klein, 91, Hungarian-Swedish biologist.
- V. C. Kulandaiswamy, 87, Indian academic.
- Miles Lord, 97, American federal judge, U. S. District Court for the District of Minnesota (1966–1985), Attorney General of Minnesota (1955–1960).
- Ian McCaskill, 78, British meteorologist and weatherman.
- Tommy McCulloch, 82, Scottish footballer (Clyde).
- Sergey Mikaelyan, 93, Russian film director (Love by Request).
- John Montague, 87, Irish poet.
- John Newhouse, 87, American journalist and author.
- Luciano Nobili, 83, Italian footballer (Palermo, Reggiana, Pescara).
- Isabelle Olivieri, 59, French agricultural engineer and biologist.
- Allan Prell, 79, American radio host (WBAL).
- William J. Richardson, 96, American philosopher.
- Alberto Seixas Santos, 80, Portuguese film director (Brandos Costumes).
- Balbir Singh Sidhu, 84, Kenyan Olympic hockey player.
- Robert Stiller, 88, Polish author and translator.
- William Usery Jr., 92, American politician, Secretary of Labor (1976–1977), heart failure.
- Ernst Zaugg, 82, Swiss Olympic sprinter.

=== 11 ===
- Sadiq Jalal al-Azm, 82, Syrian philosopher and academician.
- Sark Arslanian, 92, American football coach (Weber State Wildcats, Colorado State Rams).
- João Castelo, 79, Brazilian politician, Governor of Maranhão (1979–1982), complications from surgery.
- Paul Clark, 84, American politician.
- Betty Cronin, 88, American bacteriologist.
- Harry Jones, 71, American football player (Philadelphia Eagles), heart attack.
- Wardy Joubert III, 45, American preacher, football coach and internet meme, heart attack.
- Bob Krasnow, 82, American record label executive (Elektra Records), co-founder of the Rock and Roll Hall of Fame.
- Charlie McNeil, 53, Scottish footballer (Stirling).
- John Moffat, 97, British navy pilot.
- Mar'ie Muhammad, 77, Indonesian politician, Finance Minister (1993–1998), brain cancer.
- Michael Nicholson, 79, British journalist and war correspondent.
- Sid O'Linn, 89, South African cricketer and footballer (Charlton Athletic).
- Kevin O'Morrison, 100, American playwright and actor (Charlie Wild, Private Detective, Sleepless in Seattle).
- Ramesh Prabhoo, 78, Indian politician, Mayor of Mumbai (1987–1988).
- Marion Pritchard, 96, Dutch-born American social worker and Righteous Among the Nations, cerebral arteriosclerosis.
- Esma Redžepova, 73, Macedonian Romani singer.
- Alan Sherlock, 78, Australian politician.
- Thressa Stadtman, 96, American biochemist.
- Roberto Vizcaíno, 59, Spanish tennis player and coach.

=== 12 ===
- Barrelhouse Chuck, 58, American blues musician, prostate cancer.
- E. R. Braithwaite, 104, Guyanese novelist (To Sir, With Love) and diplomat, heart failure.
- Myron H. Bright, 97, American judge, U. S. Court of Appeals for the Eighth Circuit (1968–2016).
- Lucila Campos, 78, Peruvian singer.
- Gerard Clifford, 75, Irish Roman Catholic prelate, Auxiliary Bishop of Armagh (1991–2013).
- Donald L. Corbin, 78, American judge, Arkansas Supreme Court (2005–2014), lung cancer.
- Jean-Claude Deret, 95, French screenwriter (Thierry la Fronde).
- Anne Deveson, 86, Australian writer and broadcaster, Alzheimer's disease.
- Jimbo Elrod, 62, American football player (Kansas City Chiefs, Houston Oilers), traffic collision.
- Jean Fisher, 74, British art critic and writer.
- Mark Fisher, 57, British musician (Matt Bianco).
- Robert Gomer, 92, Austrian-born American chemical physicist, complications from Parkinson's disease.
- Shirley Hazzard, 85, Australian-born American writer (The Bay of Noon, The Great Fire).
- Gustav Jahoda, 96, Austrian-born British psychologist.
- Kojo Kamau, 77, American photographer, heart attack.
- Ratan Kumar, 75, Pakistani actor (Boot Polish, Jagriti, Do Bigha Zamin).
- Lord Gyllene, 28, New Zealand-bred racehorse, winner of the 1997 Grand National.
- Jim Lowe, 93, American singer-songwriter ("Green Door").
- Jim Prior, Baron Prior, 89, British politician, Secretary of State for Northern Ireland (1981–1984) and Employment (1979–1981).
- Konrad Reuland, 29, American football player (Baltimore Ravens), brain aneurysm.
- Javier Echevarría Rodríguez, 84, Spanish Roman Catholic prelate, head of the Prelature of the Holy Cross and Opus Dei (since 1994).
- Claus Ryskjær, 71, Danish humorist and actor.
- Bob Schnelker, 88, American football player (New York Giants) and coach.
- Leo Sharp, 92, American drug dealer.
- Charles Mwando Simba, 80, Congolese politician.
- Walter Swinburn, 55, British jockey, fall from window.
- Bob Thomas, 62, Australian politician, member of the Western Australian Legislative Council (1989–2001), mesothelioma.
- Esther Wilkins, 100, American dentist.

=== 13 ===
- William E. Bonini, 90, American geologist and geophysicist.
- Ralph Brown, 90, American football player and coach.
- Lawrence Colburn, 67, American Vietnam War veteran, intervened to end the My Lai Massacre, cancer.
- Roy Harrover, 88, American architect, emphysema.
- Bob James, 83, American Olympic sailor.
- Hebe Charlotte Kohlbrugge, 102, Dutch theologian.
- Ethel Moustacchi, 83, Egyptian-born French geneticist, research director at French National Centre for Scientific Research.
- Mohammed Najm, 72–73, Libyan military officer and political figure.
- Ahuva Ozeri, 68, Israeli singer, laryngeal cancer.
- Carl Parrini, 83, American historian.
- Betsy Pecanins, 62, American-born Mexican singer, songwriter and record producer, stroke.
- Ralph Raico, 80, American historian.
- Thomas Schelling, 95, American economist and professor, Nobel Prize laureate (2005), complications from a hip fracture.
- Poul Søgaard, 93, Danish politician, MP (1960–1990) and Defence Minister (1977–1982).
- David Strangway, 82, Canadian geophysicist.
- John Sweeney, 92, American politician.
- Zubaida Tharwat, 76, Egyptian actress (There Is a Man In Our House).
- Alan Thicke, 69, Canadian actor (Growing Pains, Not Quite Human), talk show host (The Alan Thicke Show), and songwriter, ruptured aorta.
- Fernando Vignoli, 56, Brazilian painter and sculptor, sepsis.
- Andrzej Wasilewicz, 65, Polish stage and film actor (Nie ma mocnych), and director, Alzheimer's disease.
- Yevgeny Yufit, 55, Russian filmmaker.

=== 14 ===
- Chuck Allen, 77, American football player (San Diego Chargers).
- Paulo Evaristo Arns, 95, Brazilian Roman Catholic prelate, Cardinal (since 1973) and Archbishop of São Paulo (1970–1998), complications from pneumonia.
- Fosco Becattini, 91, Italian footballer (Genoa).
- Gillian Bowler, 64, Irish businesswoman.
- Roger Crossgrove, 95, American artist and educator.
- Shirley Dysart, 88, Canadian politician, MLA (1974–1995).
- Stephen Fienberg, 74, Canadian statistician.
- Bernard Fox, 89, Welsh actor (Titanic, Bewitched, The Mummy), heart failure.
- Harold Gilliam, 98, American environmental journalist.
- Ned Goldwasser, 97, American physicist.
- Garrett K. Gomez, 44, American jockey, drug overdose.
- Hurricane Run, 14, Irish racehorse, euthanized.
- Karel Husa, 95, Czech-born American composer.
- Ronald Jack, 75, Scottish literary scholar.
- Karen Lewis-Archer, 42, Scottish Paralympic athlete, complications from cancer.
- Halfdan T. Mahler, 93, Danish physician, Director-General of the World Health Organization (1973–1988).
- Michael Manning, 75, American Roman Catholic priest, complications of brain cancer.
- Tom Ong, 78, Filipino Olympic sport shooter (1972, 1976).
- Sadatoshi Ozato, 86, Japanese politician, member of the House of Representatives (1979–2005) and Minister of Labour (1990–91).
- Päivi Paunu, 70, Finnish singer, cancer.
- Jean-Paul Pier, 83, Luxembourgish mathematician
- Ahmed Rateb, 67, Egyptian actor (The Yacoubian Building), stroke.
- Sir Dudley Smith, 90, British politician, MP for Brentford and Chiswick (1959–1966) and Warwick and Leamington (1968–1997).
- James C. Smith, 93, American major general.
- Reginald Stackhouse, 91, Canadian politician and academic.
- Harvey Stevens, 86, Australian footballer (Collingwood).
- Jeremy Summers, 85, British film and television director (The Protectors, The Saint).
- Gennady Tsygurov, 74, Russian ice hockey player (Traktor Chelyabinsk) and coach, cancer.
- Bunny Walters, 63, New Zealand singer ("Brandy").

=== 15 ===
- Albert Bennett, 72, English footballer (Rotherham United, Newcastle United, Norwich City).
- Lloyd Binch, 85, British Olympic cyclist.
- Howard Bingham, 77, American photographer and biographer (Muhammad Ali).
- Leanna Brown, 81, American politician.
- Václav Chudomel, 84, Czech Olympic runner.
- Henry Darlington, 84, American football coach.
- Beki İkala Erikli, 48, Turkish self-help author, shot.
- Shep Houghton, 102, American actor (The Wizard of Oz, Gone with the Wind, Perry Mason).
- Shūji Iuchi, 66, Japanese anime director (Crush Gear Turbo, Mashin Hero Wataru).
- Fran Jeffries, 79, American actress and dancer (The Pink Panther).
- Osiride Pevarello, 96, Italian actor (Caligula, Ator 2 - L'invincibile Orion).
- Duncan Probert, 55, British scholar.
- Craig Sager, 65, American sportscaster (NBA on TNT), leukemia.
- Harley Saito, 48, Japanese professional wrestler, esophageal cancer.
- Dave Shepherd, 87, English jazz clarinetist.
- Bohdan Smoleń, 69, Polish comedian, singer and actor, lung infection.
- Ajit Varman, 69, Indian composer.
- Ron Ziel, 77, American railway historian.
- Mohamed Zouari, 49, Tunisian flight engineer, shot.

=== 16 ===
- David Berry, 73, American playwright (The Whales of August), heart attack.
- Jigme Dorje Palbar Bista, 86, Nepalese royal, King of Mustang (1965–2008), complications from pneumonia.
- Joyce Dalton, 83, Australian cricketer.
- James Michael Gardner Fell, 93, Canadian-born American mathematician.
- Walter Hachborn, 95, Canadian businessman, co-founder of Home Hardware.
- Cecil Howard, 85, American pornographic film director.
- Bill Malenfant, 87, Canadian politician, MLA for Memramcook (1974–1982), Mayor of Dieppe, New Brunswick (1971–1977, 1983–1998).
- Faina Melnik, 71, Ukrainian-born Russian discus thrower, Olympic champion (1972).
- Saintly, 24, Australian racehorse, national champion (1997).
- Fred Swearingen, 95, American football official.
- Jim Williams, 90, American politician, Lieutenant Governor of Florida (1975–1979).
- Ive Mažuran, 89, Croatian historian.

=== 17 ===
- Houshmand Almasi, 88, Iranian Olympic fencer (1964).
- Robert G. Chambers, 92, British physicist.
- Eric Defoort, 73, Belgian politician, President of the European Free Alliance (since 2010).
- Edmond Farhat, 83, Lebanese Maronite Catholic hierarch, Apostolic Nuncio (1989–2009).
- Rudolf Franz, 79, German Olympic cyclist.
- Benjamin Gilman, 94, American politician, Member of the United States House of Representatives from New York's 20th, 22nd and 26th congressional districts (1973–2003), complications from hip surgery.
- Louis Harris, 95, American opinion polling entrepreneur, journalist, and author.
- Henry Heimlich, 96, American physician, inventor of the Heimlich maneuver, complications from a heart attack.
- Gordon Hunt, 87, American voice director (The Jetsons, Uncharted) and voice actor (Dilbert), Parkinson's disease.
- Károly Kocsis, 87, Hungarian Olympic gymnast.
- Marty Lynch, 90, Australian rules footballer (Geelong, South Melbourne).
- Rory Macnamara, 61, British businessman.
- Leanid Marakou, 58, Belarusian journalist, writer and historian, brain cancer.
- Anne Ranasinghe, 91, German-born Sri Lankan poet.
- Ismoil Talbakov, 61, Tajik politician.

=== 18 ===
- Eddie Bailham, 75, Irish footballer (Shamrock Rovers, Wimbledon).
- Ken Baird, 65, Canadian ice hockey player (Edmonton Oilers).
- Rolf Trygve Busch, 96, Norwegian diplomat, Ambassador to West Germany (1977–1982), to the United Kingdom (1982–1989).
- Enrique Cirules, 78, Cuban writer.
- Scruff Connors, 64, Canadian radio broadcaster.
- Frank Crotty, 78, New Zealand rower.
- Thomas J. Duffey, 88, American politician.
- Brendan J. Dugan, 69, American academic administrator, President of St. Francis College (since 2008).
- Zsa Zsa Gabor, 99, Hungarian-born American actress (Moulin Rouge, Touch of Evil, Lili) and socialite, heart attack.
- Ginyo Ganev, 88, Bulgarian politician.
- Bobby Guanzon, 68, Filipino journalist and politician, cardiac arrest.
- William H. Hudnut III, 84, American politician, Member of the United States House of Representatives from Indiana's 11th congressional district (1973–1975), Mayor of Indianapolis (1976–1992).
- Sata Isobe, 72, Japanese volleyball player, Olympic champion (1964).
- Vibeke Knudsen, 68, Norwegian diplomat, ambassador to Colombia (2009–2016).
- Ron Lawfer, 82, American politician.
- Jack V. Lunzer, 92, Belgian-born British industrial diamond merchant and museum curator (Valmadonna Trust Library).
- China Machado, 86, Chinese fashion model, cardiac arrest.
- Léo Marjane, 104, French singer.
- Bob Moir, 87, Canadian television producer and sports commentator.
- Sonny Moran, 90, American college basketball coach (West Virginia).
- Ruth Mountaingrove, 93, American photographer and musician.
- Herbert Nootbaar, 108, American businessman and philanthropist.
- Rachel Owen, 48, British academic and print-maker, cancer.
- Gustavo Quintero, 76, Colombian singer-songwriter.
- Gordie Tapp, 94, Canadian country singer and entertainer (Hee Haw).
- Margit Tóth, 55, Hungarian Olympic artistic gymnast (1976).
- Heinz Ulzheimer, 90, German athlete, Olympic bronze medalist (1952).
- Joan Upton, 94, British Olympic hurdler.
- Thomas Warburton, 98, Finnish writer and translator.

=== 19 ===
- Elizabeth Bell, 88, American composer.
- Arthur Berry, 88, New Zealand cricketer.
- Ger Blok, 77, Dutch football manager (Honduras and Myanmar national teams).
- Lionel Blue, 86, British rabbi, journalist and broadcaster, complications from Parkinson's disease.
- Anne Borg, 80, Norwegian ballet dancer.
- Phil Gagliano, 74, American baseball player (St. Louis Cardinals, Chicago Cubs, Boston Red Sox).
- Hugh Iltis, 91, Czech-born American botanist, complications of a vascular disease.
- Andrei Karlov, 62, Russian diplomat, Ambassador to Turkey (since 2013), shot.
- Annette Karmiloff-Smith, 78, British neuroscientist.
- Dick Latessa, 87, American actor (Hairspray, Promises, Promises, Stigmata), heart failure.
- Ville Lyytikäinen, 49, Finnish football coach (Atlantis FC).
- Anupam Mishra, 68, Indian author, journalist and environmentalist.
- Sir John Oakeley, 8th Baronet, 84, British Olympic yachtsman (1972).
- Jim Pettapiece, 79, Canadian curler, world champion (1970, 1971), cancer.
- Anique Poitras, 55, Canadian writer.
- Kishori Sinha, 91, Indian politician.
- Fidel Uriarte, 71, Spanish footballer (Athletic Bilbao, national team).
- Christopher Young, 71, British rugby league player (Hull Kingston Rovers, Great Britain), complications from cancer and chest infection.

=== 20 ===
- Lawrence Borst, 89, American politician, member of the Indiana House of Representatives (1967) and Senate (1969–2005).
- Robert Eddins, 28, American football player (Buffalo Bills), shot.
- Raymond Heacock, 88, American engineer.
- Toby Hemenway, 64, American author and educator, pancreatic cancer.
- El Hortelano, 62, Spanish painter.
- Patrick Jenkin, Baron Jenkin of Roding, 90, British politician, Secretary of State for Social Services (1979–1981), Industry (1981–1983), and Environment (1983–1985).
- Andrew Karpati Kennedy, 85, Hungarian-born British author and literary critic.
- Andrew Killgore, 97, American diplomat, Ambassador to Qatar (1977–1980).
- Mamoru Matsunaga, 80, Japanese-born Dominican judoka.
- Margaret Maxfield, 90, American mathematician.
- Michèle Morgan, 96, French film actress (Port of Shadows, Passage to Marseille, La Symphonie pastorale).
- Archie Norman, 104, British paediatrician.
- Dame Frances Patterson, 62, British judge.
- Paul Peter Porges, 89, American cartoonist (Mad).
- Betty Swenson, 83, American politician.
- Jagannatha Varma, 77, Indian actor (Devasuram, Dolls).

=== 21 ===
- Mandell Berman, 99, American businessman and philanthropist.
- Corno, 64, Canadian artist, throat cancer.
- Deddie Davies, 78, British actress (The Railway Children, Stella) and musician (The Zimmers).
- Welington de Melo, 70, Brazilian mathematician.
- Sidney Drell, 90, American physicist.
- Rob Gray, 54, Canadian production designer (Falling Skies, Fido, Shadowhunters), cancer.
- Abdul Gafur Hali, 87, Bangladeshi singer, composer and lyricist.
- John Gwilliam, 93, Welsh rugby union player (national team).
- Robert Leo Hulseman, 84, American entrepreneur, inventor of the red solo cup.
- Bob Jeffery, 81, British Anglican priest, Dean of Worcester (1987–1996).
- Jaan Klõšeiko, 77, Estonian printmaker and photographer.
- Remigijus Morkevičius, 34, Lithuanian mixed martial artist and kickboxer, shot.
- Đặng Tuyết Mai, 75, Vietnamese air hostess, First Lady of South Vietnam.
- Sir Nigel Nicholls, 78, British civil servant, Clerk of the Privy Council (1992–1998).
- Weston Noble, 94, American music educator and conductor, complications from a fall.
- Şehmus Özer, 36, Turkish footballer (Amed, Mardinspor), traffic collision.
- Vyacheslav Shalevich, 82, Russian actor (Seventeen Moments of Spring, The Master and Margarita).
- Eri Sugai, 55, Japanese singer.
- Betty Loo Taylor, 87, American jazz pianist.

=== 22 ===
- William Abitbol, 67, French politician.
- Carlos Averhoff, 69, Cuban jazz saxophonist.
- John Buckingham, 76, British jockey.
- Mocho Cota, 62, Mexican professional wrestler (CMLL).
- Yevgeny Dzhugashvili, 80, Russian-Georgian activist and politician.
- Solomon Levy, 80, Gibraltarian politician, Mayor of Gibraltar (2008–2009).
- Andre Martel, 70, American politician, member of the New Hampshire House of Representatives (1998–2002, since 2012).
- Jack O'Brien, 84, American football player (Pittsburgh Steelers).
- Sidney Pestka, 80, Polish-born American biochemist and geneticist.
- Bill Price, 72, British record producer (Tom Jones, The Sex Pistols, The Clash).
- Sidney Percy Roberson, 79, British bodybuilder and director (The Sweeney).
- Philip Saville, 86, British television director and screenwriter.
- Kenneth Snelson, 89, American sculptor (Needle Tower, Six Number Two), prostate cancer.
- Franca Sozzani, 66, Italian journalist, Editor-in-chief of Vogue Italia (since 1988).
- Ken Turner, 72, American baseball player (California Angels).
- Sir Dwight Venner, 70, Vincentian banker.
- Lella Vignelli, 82, Italian designer, dementia.
- Lillian Walker, 93, American politician.
- Miruts Yifter, 72, Ethiopian long-distance runner, Olympic champion (1980), complications from collapsed lung.

=== 23 ===
- John Aitchison, 90, Scottish statistician.
- Anis Amri, 24, Tunisian terrorism suspect, shot.
- Joyce Appleby, 87, American historian.
- Claude Arnold, 92, Canadian football player (Edmonton Eskimos).
- Doug Coombs, 92, New Zealand geologist (University of Otago) and cricketer (Otago).
- Jean Gagnon, 75, Canadian Roman Catholic prelate, Bishop of Gaspé (2002–2016).
- Robert Hinde, 93, British zoologist, Master of St John's College, Cambridge (1989–1994).
- Meto Jovanovski, 88, Macedonian writer.
- Willa Kim, 99, American costume designer (The Will Rogers Follies).
- Jim Lehew, 79, American baseball player (Baltimore Orioles), congestive heart failure.
- James F. Merow, 84, American judge.
- Poul Pedersen, 84, Danish footballer, Olympic silver medalist (1960).
- Tim Pitsiulak, 49, Canadian artist, complications from pneumonia.
- Chethan Ramarao, 76, Indian actor.
- Andrés Rivera, 88, Argentine writer.
- Heinrich Schiff, 65, Austrian cellist.
- Piers Sellers, 61, British astronaut and meteorologist, pancreatic cancer.
- Luba Skořepová, 93, Czech actress.
- Vladimir Stupishin, 84, Russian diplomat, first Ambassador of Russia to Armenia (1992–1994).
- George Thompson, 88, Scottish politician, MP for Galloway (1974–1979).
- Vesna Vulović, 66, Serbian flight attendant, world record holder for longest fall.

=== 24 ===
- Edith Ackermann, 70, Swiss-born American psychologist.
- Richard Adams, 96, British author (Watership Down, The Plague Dogs, Shardik), complications from a blood disorder.
- Pape Badiane, 36, French basketball player (Chorale Roanne, Poitiers Basket 86, national team), traffic collision.
- John Barfield, 52, American baseball player (Texas Rangers), shot.
- Dinanath Bhargava, 89, Indian artist, cardiac ailment.
- Aloke Bhattacharjee, 63, Indian cricketer and umpire.
- Ron Broom, 91, New Zealand cricketer (Wellington).
- Philip Cannon, 87, British composer.
- Davis Earle, 79, Canadian physicist.
- Joseph Fitzmyer, 96, American Roman Catholic priest and professor (The Catholic University of America).
- Jeffrey Hayden, 90, American television director and producer (Peyton Place, The Donna Reed Show).
- Georgia Mills Jessup, 90, American artist.
- Felix Krivin, 88, Ukrainian-Israeli writer and poet.
- Jill Martin, 78, English actress and singer.
- Ted Meines, 95, Dutch military officer and veteran affairs activist.
- Rick Parfitt, 68, British singer, songwriter and guitarist (Status Quo), infection.
- Gil Parrondo, 95, Spanish art director and production designer (Patton, Nicholas and Alexandra, Travels with My Aunt), Oscar winner (1971, 1972).
- Edwin Reinecke, 92, American politician, Member of the United States House of Representatives from California's 27th congressional district (1965–1969) and Lieutenant Governor of California (1969–1974).
- Vasant Sarwate, 89, Indian cartoonist and author.
- Liz Smith, 95, English actress (The Royle Family, I Didn't Know You Cared, Charlie and the Chocolate Factory).
- Bronson Thayer, 77, American banker and civil leader, prostate cancer.
- C. Howard Wilkins Jr., 78, American businessman and diplomat, Ambassador to the Netherlands (1989–1992).
- George Williams, 81, British racewalker.
- Zhao Ermi, 86, Chinese zoologist.
- Ben Xi, 22, Chinese singer.

=== 25 ===
- Aghakhan Abdullayev, 66, Azerbaijani folk singer.
- Sibylle Boden-Gerstner, 96, German costume designer and fashion writer.
- Lady Marion Fraser, 84, Scottish music educator.
- Konstantin Georgiev, 84, Bulgarian Olympic basketball player.
- Sandra Giles, 84, American actress (Daddy-O).
- Karl Golser, 73, Italian Roman Catholic prelate, Bishop of Bolzano-Bressanone (2008–2011).
- William B. Gragg, 80, American mathematician.
- John Gregson, 92, British George Cross recipient.
- Jim Malacko, 86, Canadian ice hockey player (Lethbridge Maple Leafs).
- George Michael, 53, British singer (Wham!) and songwriter ("Wake Me Up Before You Go-Go", "Careless Whisper", "Faith"), Grammy winner (1987, 1989), cardiomyopathy.
- Alphonse Mouzon, 68, American jazz drummer (Weather Report, The Eleventh House) and record label owner, neuroendocrine carcinoma.
- John Nike, 81, English businessman.
- Carrol Orrison, 87, American politician.
- Georgi Panov, 83, Bulgarian Olympic basketball player.
- Miriam Pirazzini, 98, Italian opera singer.
- Núria Pompeia, 85, Spanish cartoonist and feminist activist.
- Vera Rubin, 88, American astronomer, innovator of dark matter theory, dementia.
- Johnny Rutherford, 91, American baseball player (Brooklyn Dodgers).
- Léon-Raymond Soulier, 92, French Roman Catholic prelate, Bishop of Pamiers (1971–1987) and Limoges (1988–2000).
- Eliseo Subiela, 71, Argentine film director (Man Facing Southeast, The Adventures of God).
- Rafael Vardi, 94, Israeli general.
- Michael Wood, 76, American special effects artist.
- Notable Russian people killed in the Russian Defence Ministry Tupolev Tu-154 crash:
  - Elizaveta Glinka, 54, humanitarian worker and charity activist.
  - Anton Gubankov, 51, scholar and journalist, Director of the Department of Culture (since 2013).
  - Valery Khalilov, 64, military band conductor.

=== 26 ===
- Abu Jandal al-Kuwaiti, 30s, Kuwaiti ISIL commander.
- Michele Amas, 55, New Zealand actress and playwright, cancer.
- Kyriakos Amiridis, 59, Greek diplomat, Ambassador to Brazil, homicide.
- Ashot Anastasian, 52, Armenian chess grandmaster.
- John J. Benoit, 64, American politician, member of the California State Senate (2008–2009), pancreatic cancer.
- Joachim Calmeyer, 85, Norwegian actor (Kitchen Stories).
- Jaume Camprodon i Rovira, 90, Spanish Roman Catholic prelate, Bishop of Girona (1973–2001).
- Duck Edwing, 82, American cartoonist (Mad).
- Madeleine Front, 86, French Olympic alpine skier.
- Frances Gabe, 101, American artist and inventor.
- Adriano Go, 66, Filipino basketball coach, stroke.
- Petr Hájek, 76, Czech mathematician.
- Ricky Harris, 54, American comedian and actor (Heat, Dope, Everybody Hates Chris), heart attack.
- George S. Irving, 94, American actor (Underdog, Me and My Girl, The Year Without a Santa Claus), heart failure.
- József Katona, 75, Hungarian Olympic swimmer (1960, 1964).
- Charles Dwight Lahr, 72, American mathematician.
- Bujar Lako, 69, Albanian actor (Amsterdam Express).
- Antonio Martínez, 90, Filipino Olympic basketball player (1952).
- Seth J. McKee, 100, American military officer.
- Peter Nowell, 88, American cancer researcher.
- Luciano Panetti, 87, Italian football player and manager.
- Elvio Porta, 71, Italian screenwriter and film director (What if Gargiulo Finds Out?).
- Martin Reagan, 92, English football player and manager (women's national team).
- Fernando Rojas, 95, Mexican Olympic basketball player.
- Buddha Sayami, 72, Nepalese politician and poet.
- Dudley Shapere, 92, American philosopher.
- Barbara Tarbuck, 74, American actress (General Hospital, Short Circuit, American Horror Story), Creutzfeldt–Jakob disease.
- Mary Wondrausch, 93, British artist and potter.
- Ashot Yeghiazaryan, 73, Armenian diplomat and politician, Interim Minister of Foreign Affairs (1991).

=== 27 ===
- Chrissy Adams, 49, American attorney, Chief Solicitor for South Carolina Circuit Court Tenth Judicial Circuit (since 2005), cancer.
- John Calnan, 84, American comic book artist (Batman, Superman), co-creator of Lucius Fox.
- Gloria Begué Cantón, 85, Spanish professor, senator and magistrate.
- Mariza Corrêa, 71, Brazilian anthropologist.
- Anthony Cronin, 88, Irish poet and novelist.
- Bruce DeHaven, 68, American football coach (Buffalo Bills, Carolina Panthers), prostate cancer.
- Jules Dervaes, 69, American urban homesteading leader, pulmonary embolism.
- Maurice Failevic, 83, French film director.
- Carrie Fisher, 60, American actress (Star Wars, When Harry Met Sally...), novelist and screenwriter (Postcards from the Edge), cardiac arrest.
- Claude Gensac, 89, French actress (Scènes de ménages).
- Heno Magee, 77, Irish playwright.
- Annanias Mathe, 40, Mozambican criminal.
- George A. Russell, 95, American educator, President of University of Missouri System (1991–1996).
- Hans Tietmeyer, 85, German economist, President of Deutsche Bundesbank (1993–1999).
- Ellen Watters, 28, Canadian racing cyclist, injuries sustained in a traffic collision.
- Ratnasiri Wickremanayake, 83, Sri Lankan politician, Prime Minister (2000–2001, 2005–2010).
- Chuck Wright, 97, American politician, Mayor of Topeka, Kansas (1965–1969).

=== 28 ===
- Gregorio Conrado Álvarez, 91, Uruguayan politician, President (1981–1985).
- Pierre Barouh, 82, French actor (A Man and a Woman), writer and musician, heart attack.
- Lars Bilet, 89, Norwegian Olympic wrestler.
- Gilles Borrie, 91, Dutch politician and historian, Mayor of Sleen (1960–1968), Tiel (1968–1973), Rheden (1973–1979), and Eindhoven (1979–1987).
- Bill Bowes, 90, American venture capitalist.
- Sally Crossing, 70, Australian health advocate.
- Michel Déon, 97, French novelist and literary columnist, pulmonary embolism.
- Donya Fannizadeh, 49, Iranian puppeteer (Kolah Ghermezi), cancer.
- Minnevali Galiyev, 86, Russian Olympic skier.
- Lev Gor'kov, 87, Russian-born American physicist.
- Balozi Harvey, 76, American community activist.
- Annelise Hovmand, 92, Danish director and screenwriter (Be Dear to Me).
- Knut Kiesewetter, 75, German jazz musician, singer-songwriter and producer.
- Kyi Aye, 87, Burmese writer.
- Pan Pan, 31, Chinese-born giant panda.
- Sunder Lal Patwa, 92, Indian politician, Chief Minister of Madhya Pradesh (1980, 1990–1992), heart attack.
- Bruce D. Porter, 64, American Mormon elder, member of the First Quorum of the Seventy (since 2003).
- Paul Powell, 83, American Baptist minister and educator, complications from a stroke.
- Debbie Reynolds, 84, American actress, dancer (Singin' in the Rain, The Unsinkable Molly Brown) and singer ("Tammy"), stroke.
- Edgar Robles, 39, Paraguayan footballer (Libertad).
- Marilyn Sachs, 89, American author.
- Jean-Christophe Victor, 69, French political scientist, heart attack.
- Bernard Zaslav, 90, American viola soloist.

=== 29 ===
- Raymond Burki, 67, Swiss cartoonist, cancer.
- Derick Burleson, 53, American academic and writer.
- Chris Cannizzaro, 78, American baseball player (New York Mets, San Diego Padres), emphysema.
- Laurie Carlos, 67, American performance artist, playwright and theater director, colon cancer.
- Keion Carpenter, 39, American football player (Buffalo Bills, Atlanta Falcons), injuries sustained in a fall.
- Matt Carragher, 40, English footballer (Wigan, Port Vale), cancer.
- Arthur H. Cash, 94, American academic and biographer.
- Kamal Mani Dixit, 87, Nepalese writer.
- Uzama Douglas, 18, Nigerian footballer (Gombe United), shot.
- LaVell Edwards, 86, American football coach (BYU Cougars), complications from a broken hip.
- Pooran Farrokhzad, 83, Iranian writer, poet, playwright, and encyclopedist, cardiac arrest.
- Néstor Gonçalves, 80, Uruguayan footballer (Peñarol).
- Larry Hawkins, 73, American politician.
- Santi Ibáñez, 58, Spanish actor (El Cor de la Ciutat, Plats Bruts), lung cancer.
- F. Ross Johnson, 85, Canadian businessman (RJR Nabisco), pneumonia.
- John Kelly, 84, British boxer.
- Aleksander Koj, 81, Polish biochemist.
- Ferdinand Kübler, 97, Swiss racing cyclist, Tour de France winner (1950).
- Dwight Lee, 71, American football player (San Francisco 49ers, Atlanta Falcons, Montreal Alouettes).
- Judith Mason, 78, South African painter.
- Jinpachi Nezu, 69, Japanese actor (Farewell to the Land), pneumonia.
- Maurice M. Paul, 84, American judge.
- Norman Rimmington, 93, English footballer (Hartlepool, Barnsley), kidney failure.
- William Salice, 83, Italian businessman and inventor (Kinder Surprise), stroke.
- Lucien Schaeffer, 88, French footballer (Valenciennes, RC Strasbourg).
- Gustav Schmidt, 90, German Olympic canoeist.
- Peter Tamm, 88, German publishing manager (Axel Springer Verlag).
- Olga Ulianova, 53, Russian-Chilean historian, cancer.
- Philip Wolfe, 89, American mathematician.
- Wacław Zalewski, 99, Polish construction engineer.

=== 30 ===
- Ad-Diba, 89, Egyptian football player (Al Ittihad Alexandria Club).
- Emile Beaulieu, 85, American politician.
- Cara Rafaela, 23, American racehorse, euthanized. (death announced on this date)
- Rosanna Carter, 98, American actress (The Brother from Another Planet, She-Devil, Law & Order).
- Rich Conaty, 62, American disc jockey, lymphoma.
- Rupert Deen, 78, British Olympic luger.
- Thomas Ludger Dupré, 83, American Roman Catholic prelate, Bishop of Springfield in Massachusetts (1995–2004).
- Selig S. Harrison, 89, American journalist, blood disorder.
- Gabriel Jiménez Remus, 76, Mexican diplomat and politician, Ambassador to Cuba (2007–2013) and Spain (2001–2007), member of the Senate of the Republic (1994–2000) and Congress of Jalisco (1988–1991).
- Hugh S. Jordan, 95, American politician.
- George Kosana, 81, American actor (Night of the Living Dead).
- Con Linton, 78, New Zealand Olympic sailor.
- Jan Lutomski, 79, Polish Olympic swimmer (1960).
- Justo Mullor García, 84, Spanish Roman Catholic prelate, Apostolic Nuncio (1979–2000), President of Pontifical Ecclesiastical Academy (2000–2007).
- Judith Ortiz Cofer, 64, Puerto Rican-American writer, liver cancer.
- Balasaheb Vikhe Patil, 84, Indian politician.
- Gopal Rath, 71, Indian poet.
- Glen L. Rudd, 98, American general authority of the Church of Jesus Christ of Latter-day Saints.
- Huston Smith, 97, American religious scholar and author (The World's Religions).
- Matt Snorton, 74, American football player (Denver Broncos).
- Sutter Brown, 13, American Welsh Corgi belonging to Governor of California Jerry Brown.
- Allan Williams, 86, English businessman and promoter (The Beatles).
- Rose Wolfe, 100, Canadian social worker and philanthropist, chancellor of the University of Toronto.
- Tyrus Wong, 106, Chinese-born American artist and film production illustrator (Bambi, Around the World in 80 Days).

=== 31 ===
- James S. Ackerman, 97, American architectural historian.
- Imtiaz Ahmed, 88, Pakistani Test cricketer, chest infection.
- José Ángel Sánchez Asiaín, 87, Spanish economist.
- Raj Brar, 44, Indian singer and actor.
- William Christopher, 84, American actor (M*A*S*H, Gomer Pyle, U.S.M.C., The Smurfs), small-cell carcinoma.
- Henning Christophersen, 77, Danish politician, Foreign Minister (1978–1979), Finance Minister (1982–1984), Vice-President of the European Commission (1985–1995).
- Sir Dennis Faulkner, 90, British officer in the Royal Navy.
- Peter Fernando, 77, Indian Roman Catholic prelate, Bishop of Tuticorin (1999–2003) and Archbishop of Madurai (2003–2014).
- Edward Gamble, 81, Canadian Olympic archer.
- He Qun, 61, Chinese film director (Country Teachers), heart attack.
- Keiichi Ishizaka, 71, Japanese businessman (Universal Music Japan).
- Bob Kelly, 91, American football player (Los Angeles Dons, Baltimore Colts).
- Henk Koning, 83, Dutch politician, MP (1967–1977, 1981–1982, 1986, 1989–1991).
- John Langdon, 72, British-born Canadian historian.
- Manjurul Islam Liton, 48, Bangladeshi politician, MP (since 2009), shot.
- George G. Loving Jr., 93, American lieutenant general.
- David Meltzer, 79, American poet and musician, stroke.
- Shirley Neil Pettis, 92, American politician, Member of the United States House of Representatives from California's 37th congressional district (1975–1979).
- Prince Dimitri Romanov, 90, Russian prince, banker, philanthropist, and author, claimant to the headship of the Imperial House of Russia.
- Orvis Sigler, 94, American college basketball coach (Army, Centenary).
- Eva Šuranová, 70, Slovak athlete, Olympic bronze medalist (1972).
- Robert Taussat, 96, French historian and author.
