= Marias barn (TV series) =

- Genre: Children's
- Based on: New Testament, Bible/Cecil Bødker's books
- Narrated by: Ulla Sjöblom
- Country of origin: Sweden
- Original language: Swedish
- No. of seasons: 1
- No. of episodes: 24

Original release
- Network: SVT1
- Release: 1 December – 24 December 1987

Related
- Julpussar och stjärnsmällar (1986); Liv i luckan med julkalendern (1988)

Marias barn ("Maria's Child") is the Sveriges Television's Christmas calendar in 1987. It was an animated series based on the New Testament stories of Virgin Mary's son, Jesus.

== Plot ==
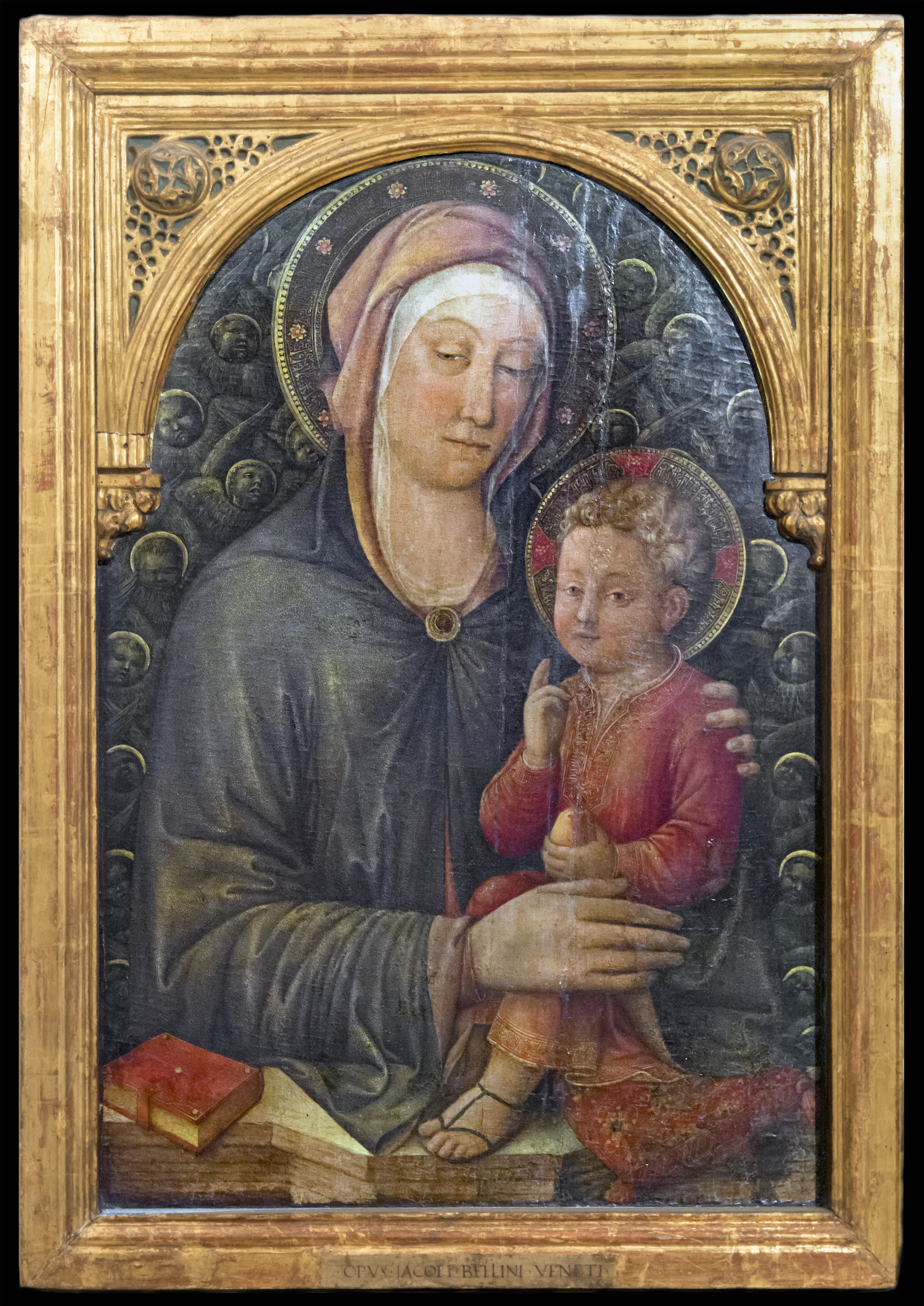
Mary with Child Jesus.

The stories are based on Danish writer Cecil Bødker's two novels, who in turn are based on the New Testament and other older stories about Jesus, as Cecil Bødker tried to reflect life in Ancient Egypt and Palestine upon the time Jesus was born. It follows the story all the way from the birth of Jesus to his crucifixion. It was narrated by Ulla Sjöblom and featured drawings by Bengt Arne Runnerström.

The series was made in response to pressure for the Christmas calendar to feature more Christian content. However, its portrayal of the children of Bethlehem being murdered on the order of Herod the Great was criticized for being too graphic.
