= Sulabha (name) =

Sulabha is a given name. Notable people with the name include:

- Sulabha, Indian scholar
- Sulabha Arya (born 1950), Indian actress
- Sulabha Brahme (c. 1932–2016), Indian economist
- Sulabha Deshpande (1937–2016), Indian actress
- Sulabha K. Kulkarni (born 1949), Indian physicist
