= Swaab =

Swaab is the surname of the following people

- Dick Swaab (born 1944), Dutch physician and neurobiologist
- Jacques Michael Swaab (1894–1963), American World War I flying ace
- John Swaab (born 1928), Dutch Olympic equestrian
- Neil Swaab (born 1978), American artist, designer, writer, and educator
- Ninna Swaab (born 1940), Swedish Olympic equestrian
- Reine Colaço Osorio-Swaab (1881–1971), Dutch composer
