= Ikala =

Ikala could refer to:

- Beki İkala Erikli (1968–2016), Turkish-Jewish author
- Cyclone Ikala (2002), in the Indian Ocean
