= Marias barn =

Novel series by Cecil Bødker

- Marias barn: drengen Marias barn: manden
- Author: Cecil Bødker
- Country: Denmark
- Language: Danish
- Publisher: Gyldendal
- Published: 1983-1984

Marias barn (Danish: Marias barn) is a novel series by Cecil Bødker. about Mary and Jesus. A Swedish TV series became the 1987 SVT Christmas calendar.

== Books ==
- Marias barn: drengen (1983)
- Marias barn: manden (1984)
