= Nootbaar =

Nootbaar is a surname. Notable people with the surname include:

- Herbert Nootbaar (1908–2016), American businessman and philanthropist
- Lars Nootbaar (born 1997), American baseball player
