= Mamoru =

- Gender: Male

Origin
- Origin: Japanese
- Meaning: Different meanings depending on the kanji used

Mamoru (まもる, マモル) is a masculine Japanese given name. Notable people with the name include:

- Marcus Mamoru Toji (born 1984), American actor
- Mamoru Fujieda (藤枝 守; born 1955), Japanese composer
- Mamoru Fujisawa or Joe Hisaishi (藤澤 守 or 久石 譲; born 1950), Japanese composer best known for his work with animator Hayao Miyazaki
- Mamoru Fukuyama (福山 守; born 1952), Japanese politician
- Mamoru Harada (原田 衛; born 1999), Japanese rugby union player
- Mamoru Hatakeyama (畠山 鎮; born 1969), Japanese shogi player
- Mamoru Hosoda (細田 守; born 1967), Japanese film director
- Mamoru Imura (井村 守; born 1948), Japanese inventor, music composer, and Chief Executive Officer of VitaCraft and VitaCraft Japan
- Mamoru Inagaki (稲垣 守; born 1949), Olympics marksmen
- Mamoru Iriguchi, Japanese multimedia artist and theatre designer
- Mamoru Kanbe (神戸 守; born 1962), Japanese anime director
- Mamoru Kishida (岸田 護; born 1981), Japanese former professional baseball starting pitcher
- Mamoru Kobayashi (小林 守; 1944–2023), Japanese politician
- Mamoru Kuroiwa (黒岩 守; born 1962), Japanese boxer
- Mamoru Matsunaga (松永 護; 1936–2016), Japanese ninth degree (kudan) judo sensei
- Mamoru Miura (三浦 守; born 1956), Japanese jurist
- Mamoru Miyano (宮野 真守; born 1983), Japanese actor and voice actor
- Mamoru Mohri (毛利 衛; born 1948), Japanese astronaut
- Mamoru Morimoto (森本 葵; born 1939), Japanese middle-distance runner
- Mamoru Nagano (永野 護; born 1960), Japanese mechanical designer, character designer, and manga artist
- Mamoru Nakamura (died 1992), Palauan jurist
- Mamoru Oguma (小熊 捍; 1885–1971), Japanese entomologist and geneticist
- Mamoru Okochi (大河内 守; born 1967), Japanese mixed martial artist
- Mamoru Oshii (押井 守; born 1951), Japanese film director
- Mamoru Oye (born 1937), Canadian judoka
- Mamoru Ozaki (尾崎 護; born 1935), Japanese high-level official
- Mamoru Samuragochi (佐村河内 守; born 1963), Japanese composer
- Mamoru Sasaki (佐々木 守; 1936–2006), Japanese TV and film screenwriter and author
- Mamoru Sato (born 1937), American modernist sculptor
- Mamoru Seki (関 衛; 1909–1942), Imperial Japanese Navy officer
- Mamoru Shigemitsu (重光 葵; 1887–1957), Japanese Minister of Foreign affairs at the end of World War II
- Mamoru Shinozaki (篠崎 護; 1908–1991), Japanese journalist for Dentsu
- Mamoru Shiragami (白神 守; born 1944), Japanese former volleyball player
- Mamoru Shō (尚 衞; born 1950), Ryukyuan businessman
- Mamoru Sugiura (杉浦 守; born 1964), Japanese illustrator/manga artist
- Mamoru Takahashi (高橋 完; born 1956), Japanese professional golfer
- Mamoru Takashima (高島 守; born 1938), Japanese ice hockey player
- Mamoru Takuma (宅間 守; 1963–2004), Japanese criminal/murderer
- Mamoru Uchida (内田 守; 1900–1982), Japanese ophthalmologist
- Mamoru Watanabe (渡辺 護; 1931–2013), Japanese film director, screenwriter and actor
- Mamoru Yamada (山田 守; 1894–1966), Japanese architect
- Mamoru Yamaguchi (山口 マモル; born 1977), Japanese mixed martial artist
- Mamoru Yokota (横田 守), Japanese anime illustrator, and character designer and producer
- Mamoru Yoshikawa (吉川 守; born 1970), Japanese ice sledge hockey player

== Fictional characters ==
- Mamoru Akasaka (赤坂 衛), a character in Higurashi no Naku Koro ni visual novel and anime series
- Mamoru Amami (天海 護), a character in The King of Braves GaoGaiGar
- Mamoru Chiba (地場 衛), a character in the Sailor Moon series
- Mamoru Endo (円堂 守), a character in the Inazuma Eleven
- Mamoru Itou (伊東 守), a character in From the New World
- Mamoru Itsuki (一樹 守), a character in Forbidden Siren 2
- Mamoru Izawa (井沢 守), a character in the Captain Tsubasa series
- Mamoru Kagemori (陰守 マモル), a character in Kage Kara Mamoru!
- Mamoru Kodai (古代 守), a character in Space Battleship Yamato
- Mamoru Takamura (鷹村 守), a character in the Hajime no Ippo series
- Mamoru Yoshimura (吉村 護), a character in Mamoru-kun ni Megami no Shukufuku wo!
- Mamoru-kun, the anthropomorphic canine mascot for Fukuoka Prefecture's disaster prevention, created by CyberConnect2. Mamoru-kun was originally planned to be the main character of Tail Concerto II, but due to the poor sales of the last game, it never came to fruition.

== See also ==
- Kage Kara Mamoru!, series of light novels written by Achi Taro
- Mamoru-kun ni Megami no Shukufuku o!, a light novel series by Hiroki Iwata
- 4613 Mamoru, a main-belt asteroid
