= Julpussar och stjärnsmällar =

- Genre: children
- Created by: Hans-Eric Hellberg
- Based on: Children's series by Hans-Eric Hellberg
- Directed by: Tomas Löfdahl
- Theme music composer: Björn Isfält
- Country of origin: Sweden
- Original language: Swedish
- No. of seasons: 1
- No. of episodes: 24

Original release
- Network: SVT1
- Release: 1 December – 24 December 1986

Related
- Trolltider med trollkalender (1985); Marias barn (1987)

Julpussar och stjärnsmällar ("Christmas Kisses and Loud Bangs") is the Sveriges Television's Christmas calendar in 1986.

== Plot ==
Based on Hans-Eric Hellberg's children's books, the story is set in and around the fictional Dalarna village of Busnäs in Sweden.

== Rerun ==
The series was shown as a rerun at SVT 1 between 21 December 1992 – 28 January 1993.

== Video ==
The series was released to DVD in 2010.
