= Bengt Arne Runnerström =

Swedish illustrator

Bengt Arne Runnerström (born 1944 in Helsingborg) is a Swedish illustrator.

Runnerström has illustrated SVT's production of Charlie and the Chocolate Factory, and the 1985 and 1987 Sveriges Television's Christmas calendars.

== Bibliography ==
- Cubeo Amazonas (1983)
- Arhuaco Sierra Nevada (1984)
- Maria från Nasaret ("Maria from Nazareth", 1987)
- Shipibo (1994)
- Följ med till Mount Everest ("Come Along to Mount Everest", 2007)

== Awards and recognitions ==
- The Elsa Beskow Award 1985 (for Arhuaco Sierra Nevada)
