= Fernando Vignoli =

Fernando Torres Vignoli (Belo Horizonte, August 14, 1960 – December 13, 2016), professionally known as Vignoli, was a Brazilian painter and sculptor. He began his career in 1982 creating canvases in oil on canvas, where he applies his own technique, which, according to him, allows a perfect balance in the distribution of the elements, leading the viewer to come across texture, plasticity and creation, in perfect Harmony within the history of each painting. The style of Vignoli is a fusion between Surrealism and Expressionism, hence the declared influence by the Spanish master Salvador Dalí. By 2013, Vignoli work had been exhibited in more than 20 nations.

Vignoli develops in his painting a very personal interpretation of human dramas, dealing with stylistic references of Romanticism, Expressionism and metaphysical painting, movements that, like Surrealism, dedicated themselves to interrogating inexpressible human dimensions. In his work it is possible to see paintings by Picasso, Munch, Miró, Magritte and Dalí adorning abandoned walls and chairs. The poetic content of the scenes is pronounced following the mysterious language of the dream, providing metaphors and multiple interpretations.

Fernando Vignoli died on a Tuesday afternoon (December 13, 2016) in his hometown Belo Horizonte. The artist, who was struggling with leukemia, had been hospitalized on the day before. However, he ended up not resisting the complications and died due to sepsis.
