= Wolfgang Eisenmenger =

German physicist

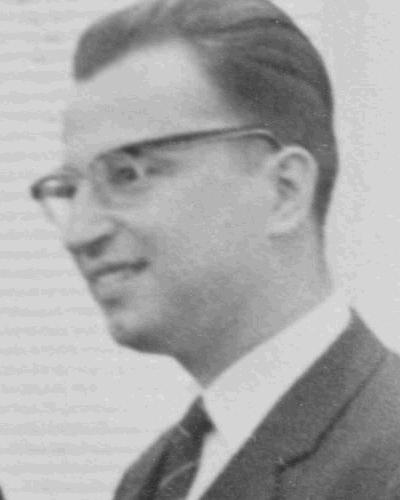
- Born: 11 February 1930; Gelsenkirchen, Germany
- Died: 10 December 2016 (aged 86)
- Education: RWTH Aachen University; University of Göttingen
- Known for: Acoustics
- Scientific career
- Fields: Physics
- Workplaces: Bell Laboratories; University of Stuttgart

Wolfgang Eisenmenger (11 February 1930 – 10 December 2016) was a German physicist.

== Fields of investigation ==
His PhD thesis (1958) dealt with the surface tension of water and aqueous solutions.

In 1964 he defended his habilitation thesis concerning experimental investigations regarding shock waves in liquids in the acoustical frequency domain. He developed from these investigations an electromagnetic shock wave generator for lithotripsy of kidney stones.

== Awards and distinctions ==
- corresponding member of Akademie der Wissenschaften zu Göttingen, since 1988
- Robert-Wichard-Pohl Award of Deutsche Physikalische Gesellschaft, 1995
- Honorary doctorate from University of Oldenburg, 2002
- Helmholtz Medal of Deutsche Gesellschaft für Akustik, 2003
