= Mauro Alanís =

Mexican weightlifter (1934–2016)

Personal information
- Full name: Mauro Alanís González
- Born: 15 January 1934; Mexico City, Mexico
- Died: 9 December 2016 (aged 82); Ciudad Madero, Mexico

Sport
- Sport: Weightlifting

Mauro Alanís (15 January 1934 – 9 December 2016) was a Mexican weightlifter. He competed at the 1960 Summer Olympics, the 1964 Summer Olympics and the 1968 Summer Olympics.
