= Ron Ziel =

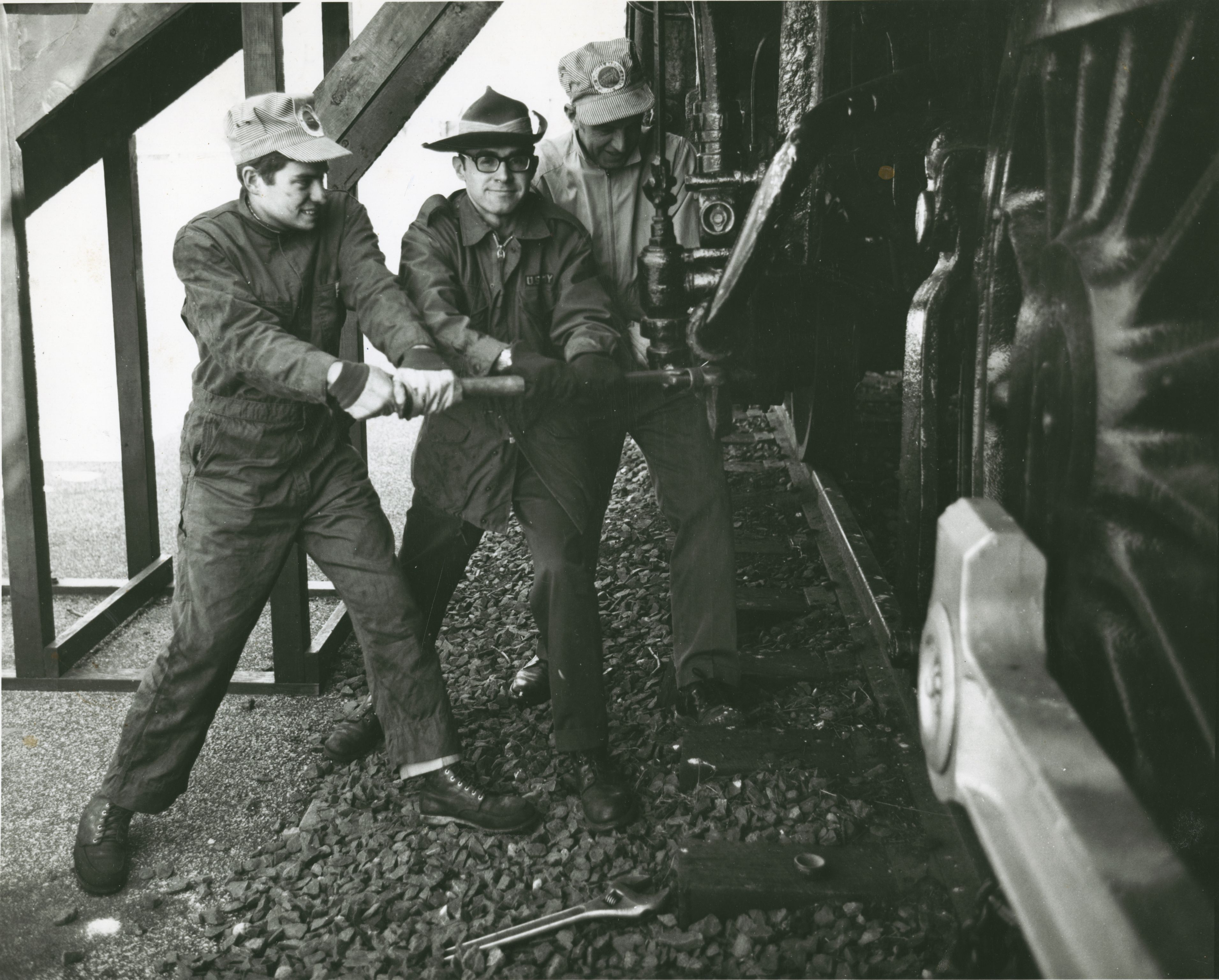
- “Ron Ziel (center) with other members of the Long Island-Sunrise Trail Chapter of the NRHS working on LIRR Engine #35 at Eisenhower Park, Westbury, NY, 1969, Photographer unknown"
- Born: Ronald Paul Ziel; July 17, 1939; New York City, New York
- Died: December 15, 2016 (aged 77); Idaho Falls, Idaho
- Occupation: Photographer/Historian

Ronald Paul Ziel (July 17, 1939 – December 15, 2016) was an American railway historian.

Born in Manhattan, his family moved to eastern Queens in 1942, and eventually settled in Melville in 1949. He first became interested in railroads as a small child, when his mother would take him to watch the trains at the Long Island Rail Road stations at Queens Village and Bellerose.

He attended Huntington High School, graduating in 1957, and studied advertising design at Pratt Institute in Brooklyn, earning a Bachelor of Fine Arts in 1961. He first began photographing steam locomotives at Brooklyn Eastern District Terminal in the fall of 1960. According to Ziel, these were the last steam locomotives to be used in freight service in the state of New York.

While at Pratt, Ziel joined the Reserve Officers' Training Corps, and upon graduation received a commission as a reserve second lieutenant in the United States Army. He served in the Army Signal Corps, stationed at Fort Gordon, Georgia, from September, 1961 to January, 1962, when he was given a medical discharge because of a diabetic condition. While stationed at Fort Gordon, Ziel began photographing steam locomotives in the southern United States. Eventually these photographs were included in his first book, “Twilight of Steam”, published by Grosset & Dunlap in 1963. He has since written ten more books, including five about the Long Island Rail Road, and has also contributed articles and photographs to Railroad Magazine, Railfan & Railroad and Trains. He also served as executive editor for Dan's Newspapers, a chain of community newspapers serving the East End of Long Island, in addition to working as a writer and staff photographer for those publications.

In 1965, Ziel and his longtime collaborator George Foster published the book “Steel Rails to the Sunrise”. In the course of researching the book they met numerous railroad historians and photographers on Long Island, an experience that led them to form a Long Island chapter of the National Railway Historical Society. The Long Island-Sunrise Trail Chapter was chartered in 1966, with Ziel serving as its first president, an office he held until 1969. Other founding members included Winfield S. Boerckel, F. Rodney Dirkes, Harold Fagerberg, Arthur J. Huneke and Robert Michel. Ziel was also the founder and first president of the Steam Locomotive 39 Preservation Fund, which was responsible for refurbishing LIRR Engine #39 and moving it from the Carriage House Museum in Stony Brook to a new location in Riverhead.

Throughout his life Ziel has traveled to over 50 countries and has, by his own estimate, taken over 25,000 photographs of steam locomotives in regular service. In April 2005 Ziel moved from his long-time home in Water Mill, New York to Tucson, Arizona. In 2008, the Archives at Queens Library purchased Ziel's collection of Long Island photographs. This collection includes both Ziel's own photographs, as well as images by other photographers that Ziel collected. While it takes as its major subject the history of the Long Island Rail Road (and to a lesser extent its parent company, the Pennsylvania Railroad), the collection also includes many photographs documenting subways, buses, trolley lines and other forms of mass transit in Brooklyn, Queens and suburban Long Island, as well as views of boats, docks, lighthouses, residences and many other subjects relating to the history of Long Island. He died at the age of 77 on December 15, 2016.

== See also ==
History of the Long Island Rail Road
