= Duncan Probert =

British medieval scholar (1961–2016)

Duncan Probert (born 13 April 1961, died on 15 December 2016) was a scholar of early medieval British place- and personal names, one of the editors of the Oxford Dictionary of Family Names in Britain and Ireland, and a council member of the English Place-Name Society from 2005 to his death. He was particularly noted for his work in his doctoral thesis and subsequent publications revising scholars' 'understanding of the relationship between the West Saxons and the Britons of the south west' in early medieval Britain. This included major contributions to understanding Kingston place-names in England, and 'searching' and 'painstaking' research showing 'how close scrutiny of charters and their bounds can allow detailed understanding of earlier land units and landscapes'.

== Life ==
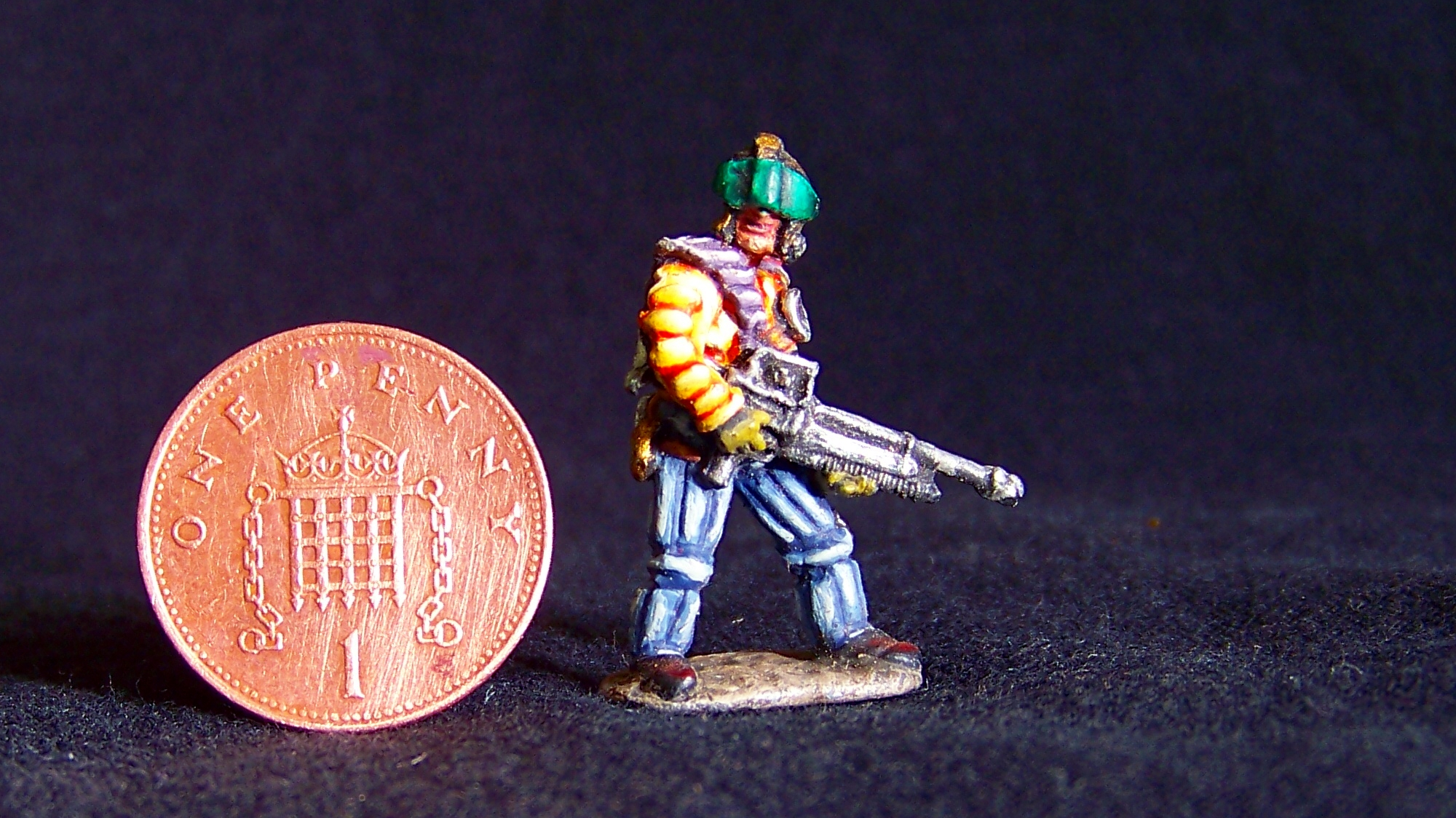
Example of miniature figure painted by Duncan Probert with English penny for scale .

Prior to beginning his career as a historian, Probert worked as 'a bio-mathematician at Grasslands Research, then after a succession of other jobs (at various times he made intricate miniature model figures, drove a skip lorry, was a school caretaker, a computer programmer, and even did some building work) he started his own graphic-design business in Stoke on Trent'. He returned to education in the 1990s, completing an Open University Arts Foundation course in 1994, taking a First in his BA in Medieval Studies at University of Birmingham in 1998, and proceeding directly to a PhD at the same institution, which he completed in 2002. During 2003-6 he was a British Academy fellow at Birmingham, and a visiting lecturer in Medieval History 2006-15, as well as a Research Associate on the ‘Family Names of the UK’ project at the University of the West of England 2012-14 and, from 2010 to his death, a research fellow at King's College, London. He also undertook historical re-enactment, mostly of the Viking Age. He 'managed to combine the hard-headedness of real-world employment experience with an irrepressible belief in the power of human ingenuity to solve problems'.

Probert was the honorand of a memorial volume of academic essays published in 2022.

== Works ==
As of May 2016, it was 'hoped that his partner, Alison, and his friend and former supervisor, Steve Bassett, will be able to bring some of his unfinished pieces to publication in the future. Unfinished work includes a draft dictionary of Devon place-names.'

=== PhD Thesis ===
- ‘Church and Landscape: a study in social transition in south-western Britain, c.300 to c.1200’, Birmingham University, Ph.D. thesis (2002).

=== Book ===
- [co-editor with several others], The Oxford Dictionary of Family Names in Britain and Ireland, ed. P. Hanks et al. (Oxford: OUP, 2016).

=== Articles ===
- ‘A model for evaluating lamb production systems’, Agricultural Systems 10 (1983), 213–44.
- ‘Mapping early medieval language change in south-west England’, Britons in Anglo-Saxon England, ed. N. J. Higham (Woodbridge: Boydell & Brewer, 2007), 233–44.
- ‘Towards a re-assessment of ‘Kingston’ place-names’, JEPNS 40 (2008), 7–22.
- ‘Two Devonshire “Cheritons”’, The Church in English Place-Names, ed. E. Quinton (Nottingham: EPNS Extra Series 4, 2009), 15–22.
- ‘New Light on Aldhelm’s letter to King Gerent of Dumnonia’, Aldhelm and Sherborne: Essays to Celebrate the Foundation of the Bishopric, ed. K. Barker (Oxford: Oxbow, 2010), 110–28.
- [co-authored with Margaret Gelling], ‘Old English stoc “place”’, JEPNS 42 (2010), 79–85
- ‘The pre-Conquest lands and parish of Crediton minster, Devon’, Place-Names, Language and the Anglo-Saxon Landscape, ed. N. J. Higham and M. J. Ryan (Woodbridge: Boydell & Brewer, 2011), 175–94.
- ‘Wulfnoð, Olaf and the Domesday scribes’, Nomina 35 (2012), 1–19.
- ‘Algar son of Leofflæd and the earliest stratum of the fratres kalendarum of Exeter’, Notes & Queries 60 (2013), 26–8.
- ‘Peasant personal names and bynames from late-eleventh-century Bury St Edmunds’, Nomina 37 (2014), 35–71.
- ‘Two misread names in the Cornish folios of the Exeter Domesday’, Notes Queries 62 (2015), 517–19. DOI: https://doi.org/10.1093/notesj/gjv156
- ‘What has Ingold to Do with Domesday? An Exercise in Identification in Late Anglo-Saxon England’, Nottingham Medieval Studies 60 (2016), 1–30. DOI: https://doi.org/10.1484/J.NMS.5.111277.

=== Database ===
- [co-authored with S. Baxter and C. P. Lewis], Prosopography of Anglo-Saxon England: Domesday, 2nd edition (2016).

=== Cartography ===
Probert was also noted for his cartographic work for a range of academic books, producing maps 'ranging in date from ancient Nubia to the Boer War'. Examples include:

- Simon Yarrow, Saints and their Communities: Miracle Stories in Twelfth Century England (Oxford: Clarendon, 2006)
- Steven Bassett, 'Anglo-Saxon Warwick', Midland History, 34.2 (2009), 123-55, https://dx.doi.org/10.1179/175638109X417332
- C. P. Lewis, 'Danish Landowners in Wessex in 1066', in Danes in Wessex: The Scandinavian Impact on Southern England, c. 800-c. 1100, ed. by Ryan Lavelle and Simon Roffey (Oxford: Oxbow, 2016), pp. 172–211
