= Russ Witte =

American swimmer (1916–2016)

Personal information
- Born: December 13, 1916 Cincinnati, Ohio, United States
- Died: December 2, 2016 (aged 99)

Sport
- Sport: Swimming

Russell B. Witte Jr. (December 13, 1916 – December 2, 2016) was an American backstroke and breaststroke swimmer. He was the U.S. Masters Swimming National Record Holder for the 95-to-99-year-old age group in the 50-yard, 100-yard and 200-yard breaststroke events swum in 2012. Witte was the reigning National Champion for 2013 in the 50 yard backstroke, 50, 100, and 200 yard breaststroke.

Witte was born on December 13, 1916. During World War II he served as a B-25 pilot and flew over 50 missions in the Mediterranean Theater. He swam for Ohio Masters Swim Club. His sons, James and Ray, 54 and 60 respectively as of July 2010, coach and swim with him. Witte also swam the Great Ohio River Swim.

Witte died on December 2, 2016, at the age of 99.
