= Joop Braakhekke =

Dutch television presenter and chef

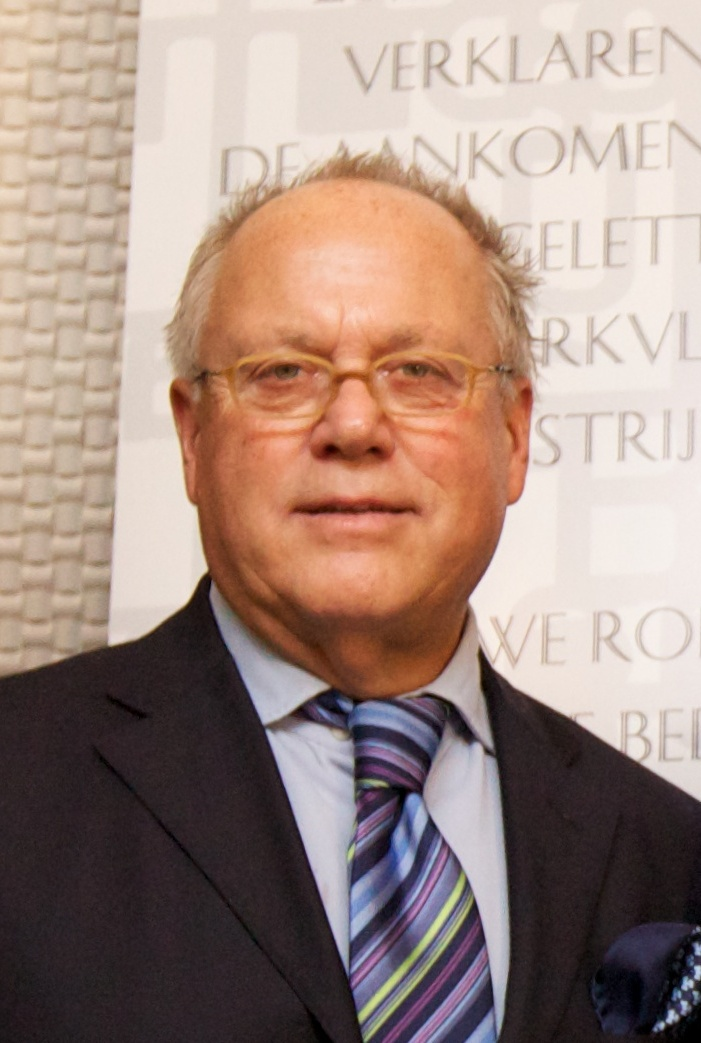
- Joop Braakhekke in 2010
- Born: Johannes Franciscus Braakhekke; 11 April 1941; Apeldoorn, Netherlands
- Died: 8 December 2016 (aged 75); Amsterdam, Netherlands
- Occupations: Celebrity chef Restaurateur; Television presenter Author
- Years active: 1993–2016
- Organization: Le Garage

Johannes Franciscus "Joop" Braakhekke (11 April 1941 – 8 December 2016) was a Dutch restaurateur, television presenter and author.

== Life ==
Braakhekke was born in Apeldoorn in the Veluwe, where he grew up. As a child he wanted to become an actor, but eventually settled on becoming a restaurateur. After high school he went to Paris and Barcelona to learn culinary arts. In 1968 he returned to the Netherlands and worked as a restaurateur, first in Apeldoorn, at the bistro Le Philosophe, and then in Amsterdam, at De Kersentuin, Le Garage, and En Pluche.

For five years beginning in 1993, Braakhekke was a presenter on the popular television cooking program Kookgek, and wrote a cookbook.

== Trivia ==
In December 2008, Braakhekke won the Loden Leeuw prize for appearing in an air freshener advertisement in the Netherlands. The prize is awarded to the most annoying television commercial.
