= James W. Gair =

American linguist

- Gair and W. S. Karunatillake working by lamplight at Karunatillake's home in Kelaniya, c. 1984/5
- Born: James Wells Gair; December 27, 1927
- Died: December 10, 2016 (aged 88); Ithaca, New York, U.S.

Academic background
- Education: University at Buffalo (B.A., M.A.); Cornell University (Ph.D.)

Academic work
- Discipline: Linguist
- Institutions: Cornell University
- Main interests: Languages of South Asia

James Wells Gair (December 27, 1927 – December 10, 2016) was an American linguist who specialized in the languages of South Asia. He is best known for his work on Sinhala, much of which was done in collaboration with W. S. Karunatillake. Other languages on which he worked include Pali, Tamil, and Dhivehi.

== Works ==
=== On Sinhala ===
- Gair, James W. (1968). "Sinhalese Diglossia". Anthropological Linguistics. 10 (8): 1–15. JSTOR 30029181.
- Gair, James W. (1970). Colloquial Sinhalese Clause Structures. The Hague: Mouton.
- Fairbanks, Gordon H.; Gair, James W.; De Silva, M. W. S. (1968). Colloquial Sinhalese. Ithaca, New York: Cornell University.
- Gair, James W.; Karunatillake, W. S. (1974). Literary Sinhala. Ithaca, New York: Cornell University.
- Gair, James W.; Karunatillake, W. S. (1976). Literary Sinhala Inflected Forms: A Synopsis with a Transliteration Guide to Sinhala Script. Ithaca, New York: Cornell University.
- Gair, James W.; Karunatillake, W. S. (1976). Samples of Contemporary Sinhala Prose with Glossary and Brief Grammatical Notes. Ithaca, New York: Cornell University.
- Gair, James W. (1985). "How Dravidianized Was Sinhala Phonology?: Some Conclusions and Cautions". In Acson, Veneeta Z.; Leed, Richard L. (eds.). Oceanic Linguistics Special Publication No. 20: For Gordon H. Fairbanks. Honolulu: University of Hawai'i Press. pp. 37–55. JSTOR 20006708.
- Gair, James W.; Paolillo, John C. (1997). Sinhala. Munich: Lincom Europa.

=== On Pali ===
- Gair, James W.; Karunatillake, W. S. (1998). A New Course in Reading Pāli: Entering the Word of the Buddha (PDF). Delhi: Motilal Banarsidass.
