= Sally Crossing =

Sally Crossing AM
- Born: Sally Fletcher; 1946; Melbourne
- Died: 26 December 2016
- Known for: Founder of the Breast Cancer Advocacy Group New South Wales

Sally Crossing AM (1946–2016) was a consumer health advocate and founder of the Breast Cancer Action Group. She was first diagnosed with breast cancer in 1995.

== Early life ==
Sally Crossing (Fletcher) was born in Melbourne in 1946, and grew up in Melbourne, then England, and from age 8 lived in Sydney. She attended North Sydney Girls High School and Abbotsleigh. She studied economics at the University of Sydney. Her paid career was in banking and government both in Australia and overseas.

She married Peter Crossing and had two children.

== Cancer experience ==
In 1995, at the age of 49, Crossing was diagnosed with early breast cancer and was treated with surgery and radiotherapy. She was again diagnosed with cancer in 2004/2005, and this time it was metastatic. She had a mastectomy and liver surgery. As of 2015 Crossing lives with chronic metastatic cancer. She died on 28 December 2016.

== Advocacy ==
In 1997 she left her paid career and established Breast Cancer Action Group New South Wales, modelled on the Victoria equivalent established in 1994. The group compiled the Directory of Breast Cancer Treatment and Services, NSW.

In 2000 she led the establishment of the Cancer Voices movement in Australia, and chaired Cancer Voices NSW. In 2005, Crossing was on the board of The Cancer Council NSW and the Consumers' Health Forum of Australia. In 2010 she was pivotal in the establishment of Health Consumers New South Wales, which she chaired. She was Convenor of Cancer Voices Australia and the Australian Cancer Consumer Network, the latter established in 2014. In 2014 she was appointed to the Board of the Australian Commission on Safety and Quality in Health Care, and to the Faculty of Radiation Oncology Council.

== Recognition ==
In 2001 Crossing received the inaugural NSW Consumer Advocate Award, for establishing the Directory of Breast Cancer Treatment and Services, NSW.

In 2005 Crossing was appointed as a Member of the Order of Australia for "services to the community through health consumer advocacy".

In 2014 Crossing accepted an honorary doctorate of Health Sciences from the University of Sydney, which was conferred on 28 November 2014. for "extraordinary leadership and contributions to supporting those with cancer from diagnosis, though treatment, care support and survivorship, in both advocacy and research".
