= Kram (novel) =

1973 novel by Hans-Eric Hellberg

- 2000 edition
- Author: Hans-Eric Hellberg
- Language: Swedish
- Published: 1973
- Publisher: Bonniers
- Publication place: Sweden

Kram ("hug") is a Swedish youth novel by Hans-Eric Hellberg, originally published in 1973 by Bonniers förlag. The book was at the time heavily debated because of the way it dealt with sexuality and sexual fantasies among young people. Commercially the book became a big success for Hellberg, and he followed up the book with four more with similar focus on young sexuality: Puss (1975), Love love love (1977), Älskar, älskar inte (1979) and Förbjudna tankar (1989).
