= Robert Stiller =

Polish translator (1928–2016)

Robert Reuven Stiller (25 January 1928 – 10 December 2016) was a Polish polyglot, writer, poet, translator, and editor.

== Life ==
Robert Stiller was born in Warsaw, Poland, to Polish parents and spent his early childhood in what is now Belarus. His father was of Jewish-Austrian descent.

At Warsaw University, Stiller studied Polish, other Slavic, and Indian languages and literatures; and at the University of Iceland, in Reykjavík, Old Norse. His scholarly activities also spanned English, German, Russian, Polynesian, Jewish, and Scandinavian literatures.

As a literary critic, he specialized in the arts of translation and editing. He served as an editor at several journals and publishing houses.

Most of Stiller's publications, including some 300 books, are translations of prose and poetry from thirty-odd languages, chiefly English, German, Russian, and Malay, as well as from French, Spanish, Middle High German, Old English, Old Norse, Icelandic, Swedish, Dutch, Yiddish, Hebrew, Latin, Czech, Slovak, Ukrainian, Lusatian, Sanskrit, Chinese, and others. His translations were often accompanied by extensive critical essays and commentaries.

Stiller did literary research (six years, altogether) in England, Iceland, Denmark, Germany, France, Netherlands, Russia, Ukraine, the United States, Central Asia, Malaysia, Singapore, and Vietnam.

In addition to his translations, he was a poet, playwright, and the author of books and essays about language.

Of Stiller's literary oeuvre, particularly notable is his version of Vladimir Nabokov's Lolita, in which he succeeded in conveying at once both the sense and the sound of the original, despite all its formal literary complexities.

Also noteworthy is Stiller's Anthology of Malay Literature, which includes nearly 80 pages of introduction and over 500 pages of the most varied writings, translated from the Malay.

Shortly after the 2006 death of his old friend, famed science-fiction writer Stanisław Lem, Stiller published a book of reminiscences, Lemie! po co umarłeś? Opowieść w reminiscencjach (Lem, What Did You Die For? A Story in Reminiscences), Kraków, vis-à-vis/etiuda, 2006.

In 2009 Stiller published a 685-page volume of his collected poetry, Poetyka pierwszej dziewiątki (Katowice, Wydawnictwo KOS), which included a CD of his readings of selected poems.

Stiller lived in Józefów, near Warsaw, with his sixth wife, Nina, née Gajewska, a singer, dancer, and actress.

== Translations ==
=== From English ===
Stiller translated, into Polish, works by Peter Cheyney, Frank Norris, Vachel Lindsay, Lewis Carroll, Eric Hoffer, Ayn Rand, John le Carré, Edward Lear, Farley Mowat, Anthony Hope, Anthony Burgess, David Morrell, Vladimir Nabokov, Robert Alley, Herman Wouk, Hilaire Belloc, Ian Fleming, John Lennon, Lynn Barber, Angel Smith, Joshua Trachtenberg, Todd Strasser, Ron Hansen, Wesley O. Hagood, Ronald Brownrigg, William Manchester, James Webb, and Andrew Holmes.

=== From German ===
German authors translated by Stiller into Polish included Johannes R. Becher, Johann Wolfgang Goethe, Heinrich Heine, Bertolt Brecht, Ludwig Achim von Arnim, Clemens Brentano, Rainer Bũttner, Siegfried Rabe, the Brothers Grimm, Horst Herrmann, Hans Hellmut Kirst, Esther Vilar, Wilhelmine Schrõder-Devrient, Micha Josef Bin Gorion (Micha Josef Berdyczewski), Karlheinz Deschner, Manfred Lurker, Wolfgang Kossak, Eugen Drewermann, Henriette von Schirach, Wilhelm Busch, Wolfgang Ott, and Lothar-Günther Buchheim.

=== From other languages ===
Stiller translated, from French, works by Henri Fauconnier, Marie-Catherine d'Aulnoy, Alfred de Musset, George Sand, and Pierre Louỹ.

Russian authors translated by Stiller included Demyan Bedny, Moris Simashko, and Lidia Chukovskaya.

Czech writers translated by Stiller included Fráňa Šrámek; Yiddish writers, Itzig Manger; Indian writers, Rabindranath Tagore, Kālidāsa, and Bilhana; and Chinese writers, Sun Zi, Wu Qi, and Tan Daoji.

== Awards ==
- 2003: Knight's Cross of the Order of Polonia Restituta, for work in intercultural contacts with Asia.
- Silver Gloria Artis Medal for Merit to Culture.
