= Archie Norman (paediatrician) =

British paediatrician

Archie Norman MBE, FRCP
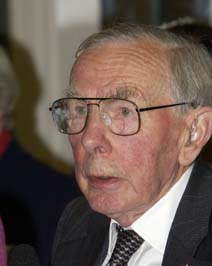
- Norman in June 2002
- Born: Archibald Norman; 19 July 1912; Oban, Scotland
- Died: 20 December 2016 (aged 104)
- Occupation: Paediatrician
- Employers: Middlesex County Council; Great Ormond Street Hospital

Archibald Norman, MBE, FRCP (19 July 1912 – 20 December 2016) was a British paediatrician, described in an obituary as "a pioneer in the treatment of respiratory diseases in children".

Archie Norman was born in Oban, Scotland, the son of Mary (née MacCallum), a nurse, and George Norman, a radiologist. he was educated at Charterhouse School, then studied medicine at Cambridge University.

He was appointed as assistant Tuberculosis Officer at Middlesex County Council in 1939, before undertaking war service from 1940 to 1945, during which time he was a prisoner of war and led 150 troops to freedom after their liberation by Russian forces, for which he was made a Member of the Order of the British Empire (MBE) in 1945.

From 1950 he was a physician at Great Ormond Street Hospital, from where he retired in 1977.

He served as Chairman of the Research Committee of the Cystic Fibrosis Trust from 1978 to 1984.

The Children's Trust's residential rehabilitation centre at Tadworth is named in his honour.

He died on 20 December 2016, aged 104.
