= Hans-Eric Hellberg =

Swedish author and journalist

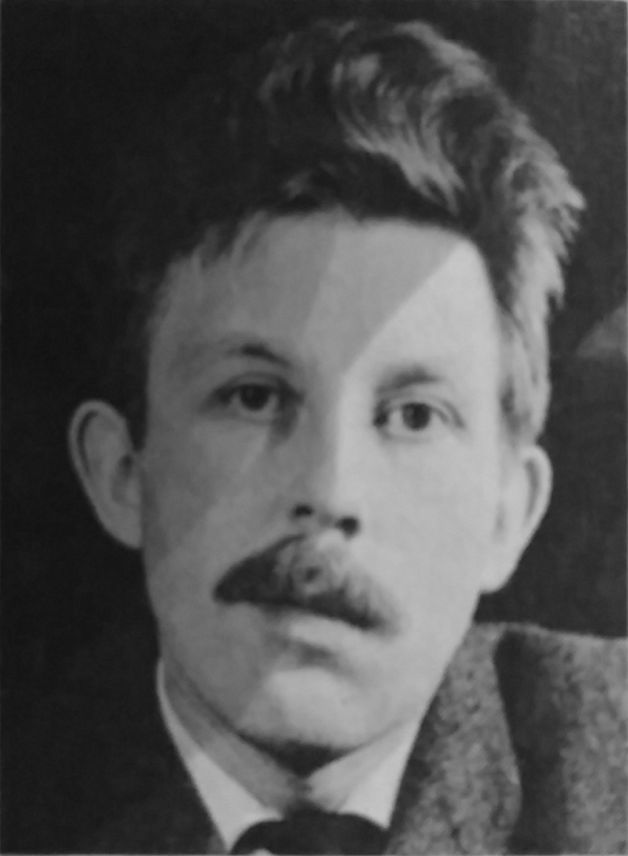
- Born: Mjälga, Borlänge, Sweden
- Died: Borlänge, Sweden
- Occupation(s): Author, journalist
- Years active: 1950–2003
- Notable work: Kram (1973)
- Awards: Nils Holgersson Plaque (1971)

Hans-Eric Hellberg (11 May 1927 – 10 December 2016) was a Swedish author and journalist. Born in Mjälga, Borlänge, he primarily wrote young adult novels, most notably Kram (1973). Active between 1950 and 2003, he wrote approximately 78 published books. The 1986 Sveriges Television's Christmas calendar (Julpussar och stjärnsmällar) was dedicated to the works of Hellberg. He won several accolades during his career spanning five decades, including the Nils Holgersson Plaque (1971).

Hellberg died on 10 December 2016 in Borlänge, at the age of 89.
