= Rodney Smith (photographer) =

American photographer

- Born: December 24, 1947; Long Island, New York
- Died: December 5, 2016 (aged 68); New York City
- Education: University of Virginia; Yale University
- Spouse: Leslie Smolan
- Website: rodneysmith.com

Rodney Lewis Smith (December 24, 1947 – December 5, 2016) was a New York-based fashion and portrait photographer.

Smith primarily photographed with a 35mm Leica M4 before he transitioned to a 120/6x6 (medium format) Hasselblad with an 80mm lens. He preferred natural light to illuminate his subjects, but occasionally used continuous lighting. Smith shot predominantly in black and white, until 2002, when he first began to experiment with color film. His work is commonly referred to as classic, minimalistic, and whimsical.

== Early life ==
Rodney Smith was born December 24, 1947, in Manhattan, New York. His father, Sanford Smith, was president of prominent fashion house Anne Klein. Rodney Smith recalled, "A sense of style, a sense of proportion and a sense of beauty and a sense of grace – all of those things were very important in my upbringing."

== Education ==
After he studied English Literature and Religious Studies at University of Virginia in 1970, Smith went for his graduate degree in Theology at Yale University in 1973. Smith said in an interview with Kodak, "I absolutely knew I wanted to be a photographer, but I didn't feel that studying in an art school or a photography department full time was the way to address the issues that were interesting to me – so I sort of entwined the two." While at Yale, he also studied under photographer, Walker Evans

== Jerusalem ==
In 1976 Mr. Smith spent 100 days photographing the people of the Holy Land, in Jerusalem. From the 88 Rolls of film shot, Smith ended up compiling two portfolios, which later became his first book: “In the Land of the Light: Israel, a Portrait of Its People (1983). Published by Houghton Mifflin Company in Israel.

== Career ==
After returning from Jerusalem, Smith spent a short time as an adjunct professor of photography at Yale University. As Smith continued his career into the nineties he slowly shifted from corporate executives to fashion photography. "My feelings about photography are exactly the same today as when I was 20. That is, I have a love/hate relationship with making pictures." Looking at pictures is one thing, he qualifies, "But making pictures – making pictures for me is hard, hard work." Rodney Smith's work has been featured in the Wall Street Journal to Martha Stewart, from Time to Bloomingdales.

In addition to his work as a photographer, Smith lectured and gave workshops.

== Personal life ==
Rodney Smith lived and worked in New York City, with his wife, Leslie Smolan, and daughter, Savannah, and son Jonah Smith. His wife, Leslie, is co-founder of graphic design and branding firm, Carbone Smolan Agency.

He is currently represented by a number of galleries both in the US and internationally; acte2galerie of Paris, France, The PhotoGallery AB of Halmstad, Sweden, FOST Gallery of Singapore, Fahey Klein Gallery of Los Angeles, California, Galerie Greenwich of Greenwich, Connecticut, Galerie Sono of Norwalk, Connecticut, Gilman Contemporary of Ketchum, Idaho, and Staley-Wise Gallery of New York, New York.

In the past 25 years, Smith received 50+ awards including First Prize for his book "The End" from International Photography Awards (IPA). He has also received several Communication Arts and Photo District News (PDN) awards.

Smith died in his sleep on December 5, 2016, at the age of 68.

== Photographic books ==
- 1980. "Portfolio I". (Rodney Smith, Publisher)
- 1980. "Portfolio II". (Rodney Smith, Publisher)
- 1983. "In the Land of Light: Israel, a Portrait of its People". ISBN 0-395-34425-5.
- 1993. "The Hat Book". ISBN 0-385-47228-5.
- 2005. "The Book of Books". ISBN 0-615-12815-7.
- 2009. "The End". ISBN 978-0-9817485-0-4.
- 2009. "The End: Special Edition". ISBN 978-0-9817485-0-4.
- 2016. "Rodney Smith Photographs." ISBN 978-0981748511.
- 2022. "Rodney Smith: A Leap of Faith" ISBN 978-1-60606-846-5.
