= Hugh S. Jordan =

American politician (1921–2016)

Member of the Georgia House of Representatives
- In office 1969–1976

Personal details
- Born: April 9, 1921 DeKalb County, Georgia, U.S.
- Died: December 30, 2016 (aged 95)
- Party: Democratic
- Education: Modern School of Business; Memphis State College; University of Georgia

Hugh S. Jordan (April 9, 1921 – December 30, 2016) was an American politician. He served as a Democratic member of the Georgia House of Representatives.

== Life and career ==
Jordan was born in DeKalb County, Georgia. He attended Modern School of Business, Memphis State College and the University of Georgia.

Jordan served in the Georgia House of Representatives from 1969 to 1976.

Jordan died on December 30, 2016, at the age of 95.
