= George G. Loving Jr. =

United States Air Force general

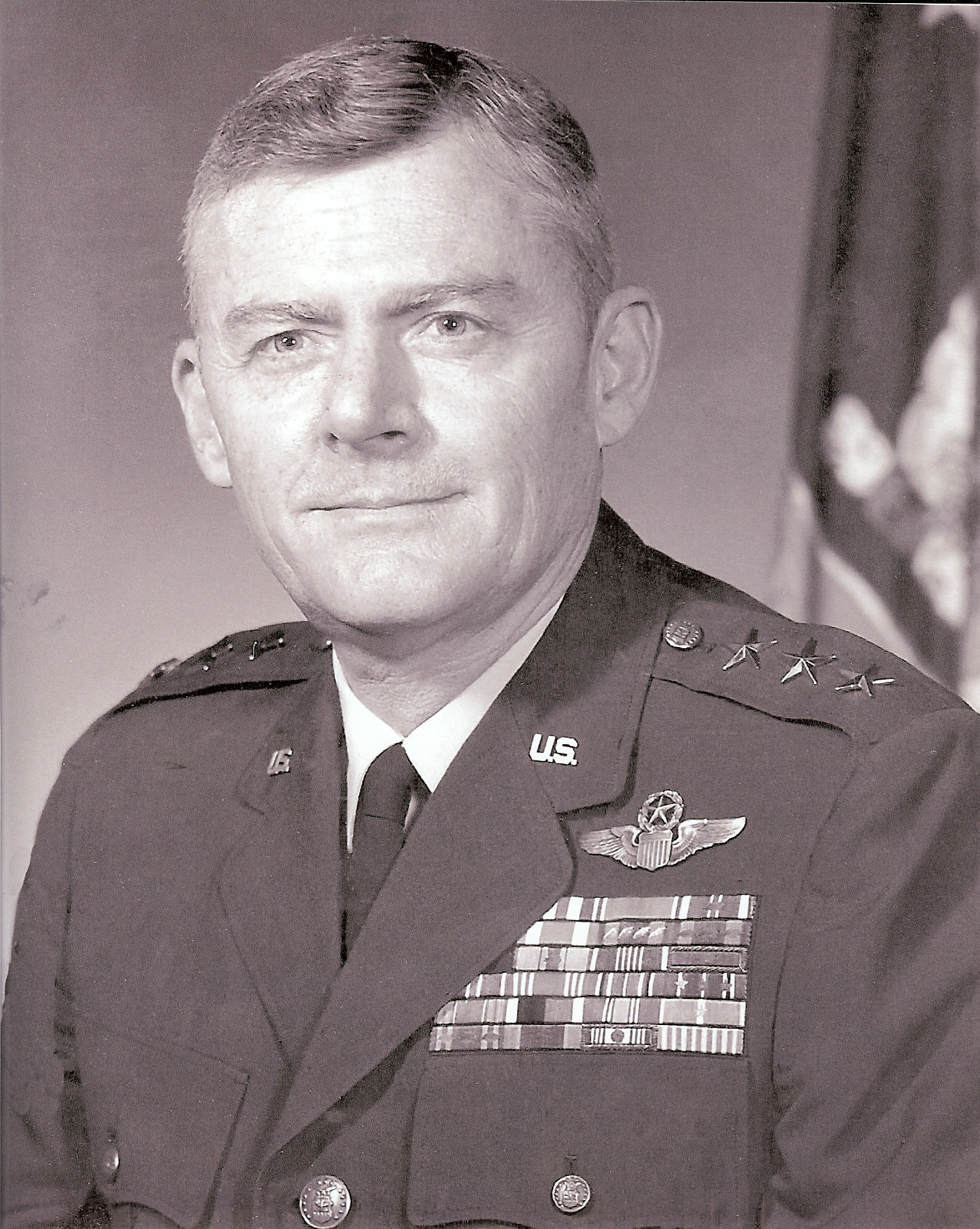
- Born: August 7, 1923; Roanoke, Virginia
- Died: December 31, 2016 (aged 93); Williamsburg, Virginia
- Military career
- Allegiance: United States
- Branch: United States Air Force
- Service years: 1942–1979
- Rank: Lieutenant General
- Commands: United States Forces Japan; Fifth Air Force; Sixth Allied Tactical Air Force; Air Command and Staff College; 9th Fighter-Bomber Squadron; 433d Fighter Squadron
- Conflicts: World War II; Korean War
- Awards: Air Force Distinguished Service Medal (2); Silver Star; Legion of Merit; Distinguished Flying Cross (2)

George Gilmer Loving Jr. (August 7, 1923 – December 31, 2016) was a United States Air Force lieutenant general who served as commander, United States Forces Japan and Fifth Air Force, with headquarters at Yokota Air Base, Japan. As commander, he was the senior United States military representative in Japan and responsible for all United States air units in Japan and the Republic of Korea.

== Early life and education ==
Loving was born in Roanoke, Virginia, in 1923, graduated from E.C. Glass High School in Lynchburg, Virginia, and attended Lynchburg College. He was a graduate of the University of Alabama and held a master's degree from The George Washington University. During the 1969 to 1970 academic year, he was a research associate with the Council on Foreign Relations.

== Military career ==
Loving entered military service in March 1942 as an aviation cadet and graduated from flying school in 1943 with a commission as second lieutenant and his pilot wings. He flew 151 combat missions as a fighter pilot with the 31st Fighter Group during World War II, flying Spitfires and P-51 aircraft over Italy, Southern France, Germany, Czechoslovakia and the other occupied countries of Eastern Europe. He became a fighter ace during this period, shooting down five enemy aircraft and damaging two others.

Loving returned to the United States in October 1944 and served as a P-47 fighter pilot instructor and base armament officer at Millville Army Air Field, New Jersey. He was next assigned as squadron commander and instructor at Shaw Field. In July 1946 he went to Itazuke Air Base, Japan, to serve in the occupation forces. Initially assigned as a personnel staff officer, he later served as commander of the 433d Fighter Squadron and as operations officer of the 475th Fighter Group.

In January 1949 Loving became operations officer at the Air Force Reserve Training Center, Byrd Field, Richmond, Virginia. He was transferred to Headquarters Ninth Air Force, Langley Air Force Base in June 1949 and assigned as a staff officer in the Personnel Directorate.

Shortly after the beginning of the Korean War, Loving volunteered for combat duty and in July 1950 went to Taegu, Korea, where he served 13 months, initially as base operations officer, and then as commander of the 9th Fighter-Bomber Squadron. He flew 113 missions against North Korean and Communist Chinese forces and participated in five major campaigns.

Between September 1951 and July 1955, Loving was assigned to the Air Proving Ground Command at Eglin Air Force Base, Florida. As a senior project officer, he was responsible for the operational suitability testing of the F-84F, KB-29 Phase II Outing Tanker, KC-97 Drogue Tanker, and various other systems and munitions. After graduation from Air Command and Staff College in June 1959, he joined the faculty as an instructor and curriculum planner with responsibility for the college's correspondence course, which had an enrollment of more than 5,000 students. He was transferred to Taiwan in April 1960 and for two years was U.S. adviser to the Republic of China's National War College.

Loving went to Headquarters Tactical Air Command at Langley Air Force Base, Virginia, in July 1962 and served for two years as a staff officer with the Policy Division (Plans), during which time he was concerned with formulating tactical air doctrine. He attended the Air War College during 1964–65 and subsequently was assigned to Headquarters U.S. Air Force in the Aerospace Doctrine Division, Office of the Deputy Chief of Staff for Plans and Operations, as a staff officer and branch chief. He was responsible for the development of Air Force and Joint doctrinal publications which form the fundamental basis for war plans and for organizing, training, equipping and employing U.S. military forces.

Loving served as commandant, Air Command and Staff College from June 1970 to January 1973. He was assigned as deputy director of plans in the Office of the Deputy Chief of Staff, Plans and operations at Headquarters U.S. Air Force, in January 1973, and served as director of plans from April 1973 to January 1975. He was appointed Joint Chiefs of Staff Representative for Mutual and Balanced Force Reduction in January 1975 and served as the senior military member of the U.S. delegation to the international conference in Vienna on MBFR.

During the period August 1975 to June 1977, he served as commander, Sixth Allied Tactical Air Force, with headquarters at Izmir, Turkey. He was reassigned to Japan and assumed command of U.S. Forces Japan and Fifth Air Force in June 1977.

A command pilot, his military decorations and awards included the Air Force Distinguished Service Medal with oak leaf cluster, Silver Star, Legion of Merit, Distinguished Flying Cross with oak leaf cluster, Meritorious Service Medal, Air Medal with 24 oak leaf clusters, Air Force Commendation Medal with oak leaf cluster, Army Commendation Medal, Presidential Unit Citation with oak leaf cluster, and the Republic of Korea Presidential Unit Citation.

Loving died December 31, 2016, in Williamsburg, Virginia.
