= Charles Dwight Lahr =

American mathematician

- Born: Charles Dwight Lahr; February 6, 1944; Philadelphia, Pennsylvania, United States
- Died: December 26, 2016 (aged 72); Lyme, New Hampshire, United States
- Education: Temple University; Syracuse University
- Known for: First tenured African-American professor of mathematics at an Ivy League college
- Scientific career
- Fields: Functional analysis, Harmonic Analysis on Groups and Semigroups, Banach Algebras, Educational Computing
- Workplaces: Dartmouth College
- Doctoral advisor: Lawrence James Lardy

Charles Dwight Lahr (February 6, 1944 – December 26, 2016) was an American mathematician, the first tenured African-American professor of mathematics at an Ivy League university, and a university administrator.

== Biography ==
Born in Philadelphia, Dwight Lahr attended Central High School and graduated Phi Beta Kappa from Temple University in 1966 with a bachelor's degree in math. He went on to earn an M.A. in 1968 and a Ph.D. in mathematics from Syracuse University in 1972, with a dissertation entitled "Approximate identities and multipliers for certain convolution measure algebras." After working at Bell Labs, he joined the faculty of Dartmouth College as an assistant professor in 1975. Lahr became an associate professor in 1981, served as associate dean of faculty for sciences and dean of graduate studies, and became full professor and dean of the faculty in 1984. In 1994, he was the founder and director of "CLIPP, a Dartmouth Summer Institute to develop computer literacy for inner city public school teachers" and to provide them computer equipment. He retired in 2014, and in 2021 Dartmouth College inaugurated the C. Dwight Lahr Lecture series.

== Publications ==
His area of specialization was functional analysis, and he published 12 papers in the field. He also contributed to a textbook, Principles of Calculus Modeling: An Interactive Approach.

1. Lahr, Charles D. (1973). Approximate identities for convolution measure algebras. Pacific Journal of Mathematics, 47(47), 147.
2. Lahr, Charles Dwight. (1973). Multipliers for Certain Convolution Measure Algebras. Transactions of the American Mathematical Society, 185, 165–181. https://doi.org/10.2307/1996432
3. Lahr, Charles D. (1974). Multipliers for $l\sb{1}$-algebras with approximate identities. Proceedings of the American Mathematical Society, 42(42), 501.
4. Lahr, Charles D. (1976). Isometric multipliers and isometric isomorphisms of 𝑙₁(𝑆). Proceedings of the American Mathematical Society, 58(1), 104–108. https://doi.org/10.1090/S0002-9939-1976-0415209-7
5. Jones, C. A., & Lahr, C. D. (1977). Weak and norm approximate identities are different. Pacific Journal of Mathematics, 72(1), 99.
6. Johnson, D. L., & Lahr, C. D. (1979a). Dual $A\sp{\ast} $-algebras of the first kind. Proceedings of the American Mathematical Society, 74(2), 311.
7. Johnson, D. L., & Lahr, C. D. (1979b). Multipliers of $A\sp{\ast} $-algebras. Proceedings of the American Mathematical Society, 74(2), 315.
8. Johnson, D. L., & Lahr, C. D. (1980). Multipliers of tensor products of CMA’s and Radon-Nikodým derivatives. Illinois Journal of Mathematics, 24(2), 216.
9. Johnson, D. L.; Lahr, C. D. The trace class of an arbitrary Hilbert algebra. Comment. Math. Univ. St. Paul. 28 (1980), no. 1, 1--9.
10. Johnson, D. L.; Lahr, C. D. Multipliers and derivations of Hilbert algebras. Math. Japon. 25 (1980), no. 1, 43–54.
11. Johnson, D. L.; Lahr, C. D. Multipliers of $L\sp{1}$-algebras with order convolution. Publ. Math. Debrecen 28 (1981), no. 1-2, 153–161.
12. Johnson, D. L., & Lahr, C. D. (1982). Weak approximate identities and multipliers. Polska Akademia Nauk. Instytut Matematyczny. Studia Mathematica, 74(1), 1.
