= Robert Taussat =

- Born: 24 June 1920; Talence, Gironde, France
- Died: 31 December 2016 (aged 96)
- Occupations: Local historian, author
- Awards: Prix Eugène Carrière (1993)

Robert Taussat (24 June 1920 – 31 December 2016) was a French local historian, biographer and novelist. He was the author of fifteen books, and the recipient of the 1993 Prix Eugène Carrière from the Académie française. He was the president of the Société des lettres, sciences et arts de l'Aveyron for two decades and the subject of a 2014 documentary about his life.

== Early life ==
Robert Taussat was born on 24 June 1920 in Talence, Gironde, France. His family was from Montfaucon, Lot.

== Career ==
Taussat began his career as a history teacher in Confolens. He subsequently worked for the Caisse d'allocations familiales for three decades. He was also a columnist for Midi Libre. Taussat was the author of fifteen books, including works of local history about Aveyron. He also wrote several biographies and novels. For example, he wrote a biography of Jean Moulin. He won the Prix Eugène Carrière from the Académie française for Sept siècles autour de la cathédrale de Rodez in 1993.

Taussat served as the president of the Société des lettres, sciences et arts de l'Aveyron from 1984 to 2004. He donated an 1843 liturgical calendar which belonged to Don Joallis Francisci de Saunhac de Belcastel to the Château de Belcastel in 2013. He also served as the honorary president of the Société Jules-Verne. In 2015, he was appointed as the president of the National Order of Merit for Aveyron.

Taussat was the subject of a 2014 documentary directed by Tristan Francia; it premiered at the Musée Fenaille in Rodez. Two years later, he was interviewed for Paroles de Ruthénois, a documentary about Rodez for the 2016 European Heritage Days.

== Death ==
Taussat died on 31 December 2016, aged 96. His funeral was held at the Rodez Cathedral on 3 January 2017.

== Selected works ==
- Taussat, Robert (1969). Dynamite sur l'Aveyron. Rodez: Subervie. OCLC 462082960.
- Taussat, Robert (1988). Aveyron roman. Portet-sur-Garonne: Loubatières. ISBN 9782862660608. OCLC 799076384.
- Taussat, Robert (1989). Rodez : l'audace dans la tradition. Portet-sur-Garonne: Loubatières. OCLC 489751963.
- Taussat, Robert (1992). Sept siècles autour de la Cathédrale de Rodez : histoire et vie quotidienne. Rodez: Editions du Rouergue. ISBN 9782905209559. OCLC 29224450.
- Taussat, Robert (1996). Hommes et femmes célèbres de l'Aveyron. Paris: Editions Bonneton. ISBN 9782862532066. OCLC 39136108.
- Taussat, Robert (1998). Rodez, un nom, une rue. Rodez: Société des lettres, sciences et arts de l'Aveyron. ISBN 9782908570076. OCLC 41529936.
- Taussat, Robert (1998). Jean Moulin : la constance et l'honneur de la République. Rodez: Fil d'Ariane. ISBN 9782912470263. OCLC 49281909.
- Taussat, Robert (1998). L'auréole de cendre : chronique des derniers temps de paix. Rodez: Fil d'Ariane. ISBN 9782912470065. OCLC 467111767.
- Bousquet, Christian; Taussat, Robert (1999). Aveyron : terre de contrastes. Rodez: Fil d'Ariane Editeur. ISBN 9782912470188. OCLC 45167352.
- Taussat, Robert; Thébault, Patrice (2006). Chapiteaux : Sainte-Foy de Conques. Rodez: Au fil du temps. ISBN 9782952674522. OCLC 85842899.
