= Gérard Desrosiers =

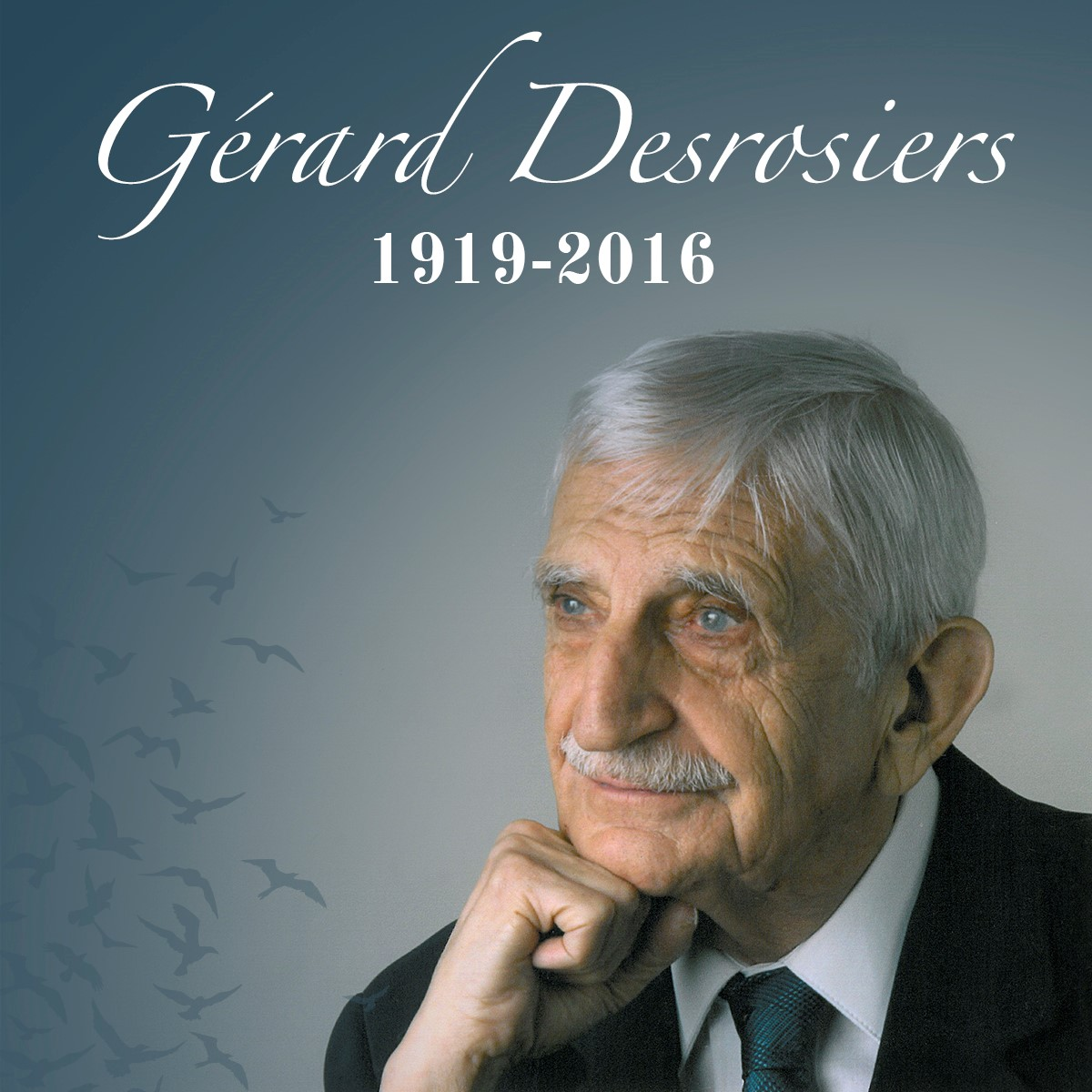
Gérard Desrosiers, founder of the central lending library la Mauricie

Gérard Desrosiers, GOQ (1919 – 1 December 2016) was a Canadian physician and the founder of the first regional library in Quebec.

In 2006, he was named Grand officer (grand officier) of the Ordre national du Québec (GOQ) for his work in founding libraries in the area of the Mauricie region of Quebec.
