= Olga Ulianova =

Russian-Chilean historian

- Born: 23 February 1963; Moscow, RSFSR, USSR
- Died: 29 December 2016 (aged 53); Santiago de Chile, Chile
- Education: Lomonosov Moscow State University
- Occupations: Historian, academic and researcher
- Known for: She specialized in contemporary history, the Cold War, the Chilean and international communist movement, and international non-state networks.

Olga Viktorovna Ulianova (Russian: Ольга Викторовна Ульянова; 23 February 1963 – 29 December 2016) was a Russian historian, born in the Soviet Union, naturalized Chilean. She specialized in contemporary history, Cold War, Chilean communism and the international non-state networks.

== Biography ==
=== Early years ===
Olga Viktorovna Ulianova was born 23 February 1963. She received a Master of Arts in history in the Lomonosov Moscow State University in 1985, and then a doctorate with mention in universal history in the same university, in 1988. Already at that time, she was devoted to studying Chilean social and political history. She worked as translator of some communist Chilean leaders exiled. She married an exiled Chilean and, in 1992, moved with him to live in Chile. She has a daughter with Chilean and Russian nationality.

=== Career ===
Ulianova worked mainly at the University of Santiago and in the Instituto de Estudios Avanzados, a research institute in which she was director between 2010 and 2015. She was director of the doctorate program in American Studies of the University of Santiago, and a guest teacher at several universities. Olga Ulianova was a member of the Historian Committee of Fondecyt and evaluator of Conicyt and a member of the editorial board of several scientific journals, both in Chile and abroad.

Ulianova specialized in the retrieval of documentary information from archives of Komintern and in general of the former USSR. She researched about Chilean communists, in particular those who developed contacts with the Comintern. She wrote several texts together with other specialists in Chilean communism, such as Rolando Álvarez Vallejos and Alfredo Riquelme.

Ulianova was an international affairs commentator on television, radio and newspapers. In 2016, she received the medal "Universidad de Santiago de Chile" from the rector of the university, Juan Manuel Zolezzi, in recognition of her academic career.

=== Death and legacy ===
Ulianova died of cancer on 29 December 2016 at a clinic in Santiago de Chile. She was 53 years old at the time of her death.

== Works ==
- Rusia: raíces históricas y dinámica de las reformas, Santiago, Editorial of University of Santiago, Collection IDEA-USACH, 1994.
- "El exilio ruso blanco y su impacto en América Latina y en Chile", en Revista de Historia, 1997, University of Concepción.
- "Primeros contactos entre en PC chileno y Komintern", en Cuadernos de Historia, Universidad de Chile, 1998.
- "Algunos aspectos de la ayuda financiera del comunismo soviético al PC chileno durante la Guerra Fría", en Estudios Públicos, Nº72, spring/1998.
- "Los primeros rusos en Chile: inicios de un proceso migratorio", en Revista de Humanidades, Andrés Bello National University, Nº5, 1999.
- Viajeros rusos en Chile, Santiago, DIBAM, 2000.
- Un Chejov desconocido, Santiago, Editorial RIL, 2000.
- "El caso de Manuel Hidalgo en el PC chileno a partir de los documentos de Komintern" en Jorge Rojas Flores y Manuel Loyola (comp.), Por un rojo amanecer. Hacia una historia de los comunistas chilenos, Santiago, 2000.
- "La Unidad Popular y el golpe militar en Chile: percepciones y análisis soviéticos", en Estudios Públicos, Nº 79, 2000.
- Chile en los archivos soviéticos, Tomo 1, Chile y Komintern 1922-1931, Estudios y Documentos, Santiago, DIBAM-LOM-USACH, 2005 (coauthor with Alfredo Riquelme).
- Políticas, redes y militancias. Chile y América Latina en el siglo XX, USACH-Ariadna, 2009 (coauthor).
- Chile en los archivos soviéticos, Tomo 2, Chile y Komintern 1931-1935, Estudios y Documentos, DIBAM-LOM, 2009 (coauthor with Alfredo Riquelme).
