= Ben Xi =

Chinese singer

Benxi
- Born: Ma Xiaochen (马晓晨); 30 June 1994; Kuytun, Ili Kazakh Autonomous Prefecture, Xinjiang, China
- Died: 24 December 2016 (aged 22); Beijing, China
- Other names: Utaoki
- Occupation: singer-songwriter
- Years active: 2011–2016

Chinese name
- Traditional Chinese: 本兮
- Simplified Chinese: 本兮
Transcriptions
Standard Mandarin
- Hanyu Pinyin: Běnxī
- Website: Benxi's Weibo; Benxi's Douban page

Benxi (Chinese: 本兮; pinyin: Běnxī, 30 June 1994 – 24 December 2016), also known as Mǎ Xiǎochén or Utaoki, was a Chinese Hui singer-songwriter.

== Biography ==
Benxi was born in Kuytun, Ili Kazakh Autonomous Prefecture, Xinjiang, China in June 1994.

In 2011, she began to enter the music scene.

On 30 June 2012, her personal music brand "Go! Go!" was established, which was the first exclusively post-90s music brand in China.

On 24 December 2016, she committed suicide by jumping off a building. Some Chinese media reported that Benxi died of depression in Beijing.
