= Anthony Reeve (picture restorer) =

Anthony McClellan Reeve (28 August 1946 – 3 December 2016) was the senior picture restorer at the National Gallery in London. He was described by Neil MacGregor as the "supreme practitioner of his generation". He was born in Crouch End, London and attended Chard School in Somerset.
