= Étienne Fabre =

French cyclist

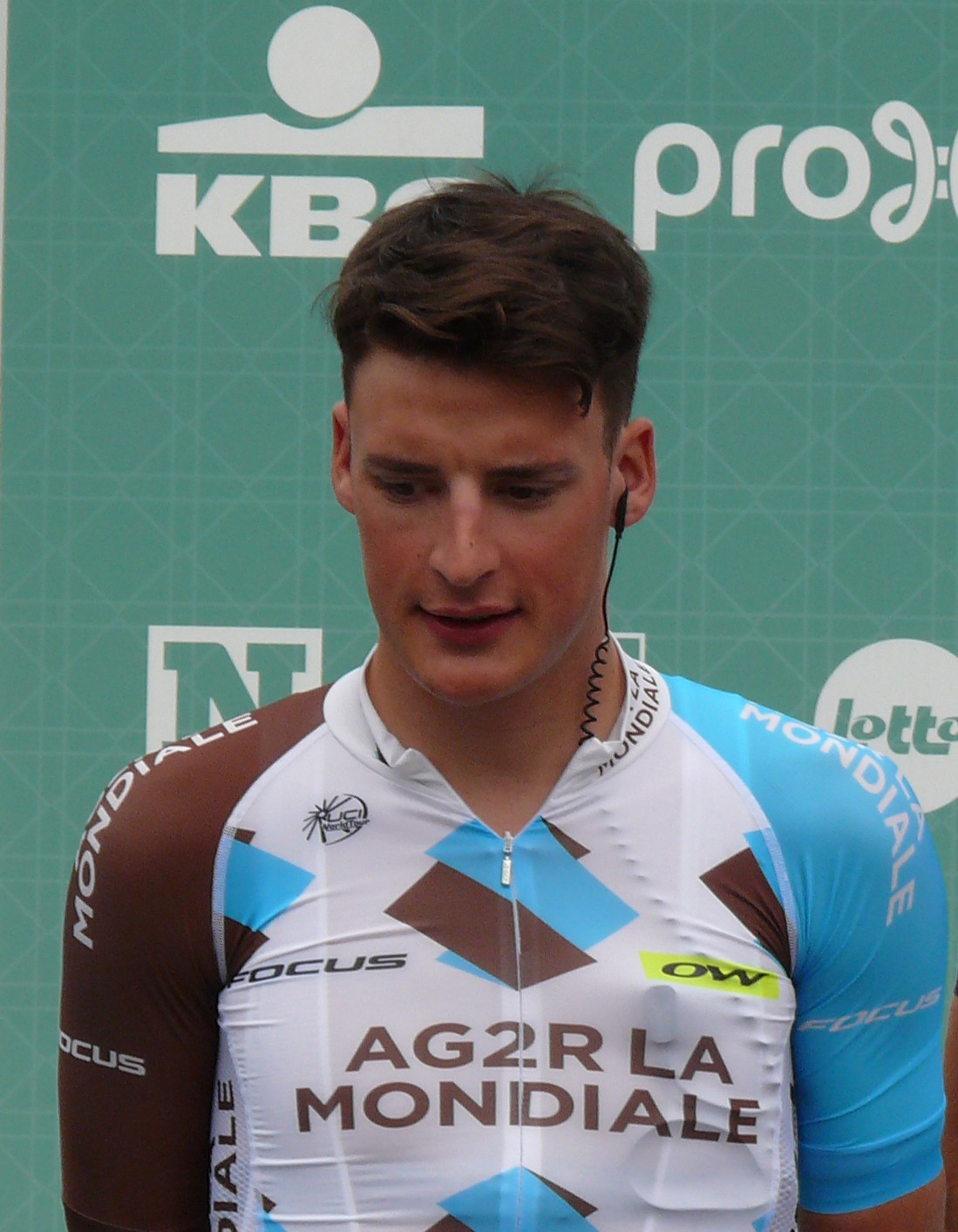
- Fabre in Brussels (September 2016)

Personal information
- Born: 5 August 1996 Rodez, Aveyron, France
- Died: 10 December 2016 (aged 20) Bauges, France

Cycling career
- Sport: Cycling
- Discipline: Road
- Role: Rider

Amateur teams
- 2005–2014: Club VC Rodez
- 2015–2016: Chambéry CF

Professional team
- 2016: AG2R La Mondiale (stagiaire)

Étienne Fabre (5 August 1996 – 10 December 2016) was a French cyclist.

== Biography ==
Born in Rodez, Aveyron, at the time of his death, Fabre competed for the professional team AG2R La Mondiale. He began cycling in 2005 for the amateur club Club VC Rodez. He also cycled for Chambéry CF, beginning in 2015. He won the Tour du Charolais and Circuit des quatre cantons races in 2016. in 2016, he finished second in the Grand Prix de la ville de Nogent-sur-Oise. He was a student at the Institut national des sciences appliquées de Lyon (INSA Lyon) prior to his death.

On 11 December 2016, Chambéry CF announced that Fabre, aged 20, died the previous day when he fell in a hiking accident on the Bauges mountain range.

== Tributes ==
- Since July 2019 there is a Square Étienne Fabre in Rodez.
- A prize Étienne Fabre dedicated to young cyclists was created by his team Chambéry CF.
