= Henry Darlington =

American football coach

Biographical details
- Born: October 12, 1932; Augusta, Georgia, U.S.
- Died: December 15, 2016 (aged 84)

Coaching career (HC unless noted)
- 1967–1971: Morehouse

Head coaching record
- Overall: 17–23–2

Henry Darlington Jr. (October 12, 1932 – December 15, 2016) was an American football coach. He served as the head football coach at Morehouse College in Atlanta, Georgia from 1967 to 1971, compiling a record of 17–23–2.
