= Beki İkala Erikli =

Turkish-Jewish author (1968–2016)

Beki İkala Erikli (born Beki Çukran, 1968 – December 15, 2016) was a Turkish-Jewish author of self-help books. She was shot to death in Istanbul on December 16, 2016.
