= Sulabha Brahme =

Indian economist

- Born: 1932
- Died: 1 December 2016 (aged 84); Pune, Maharashtra, India
- Occupations: Social activist, economist, Director of Gokhale Institute of Politics and Economics

Sulabha Brahme (c. 1932 – 1 December 2016) was a noted economist, Marxist intellectual and social activist, based in Pune, India. She served as the Director of the Gokhale Institute of Politics and Economics.

Sulabha Brahme was among the founder members of a number of progressive social organizations and movements, including Lok Vidnyan Sanghatana, Maharashtra Dushkal Nivaran and Nirmulan Mandal, Purogami Mahila Sanghatana, Lokayat, Jagatikikaran Virodhi Kruti Samiti and Bayaja Trust.

She was involved in experiments to promote organic and sustainable agriculture in Konkan. She has authored more than 50 booklets in Marathi and monographs on a range of topics for the education of activists. She maintained close links with all different shades and strands of progressive people’s movements. She was actively involved in the movement against the Jaitapur Nuclear Power Project.

Shankar Brahme Samajvidnyan Granthalaya, established by Sulabha Brahme has published most of her writings.

== List of publications by Sulabha Brahme ==
- Shetkari Jatyat (शेतकरी जात्यात, Marathi)
- Kokanacha Vikaas Ki Vinaas (कोकणचा विकास की विनाश, Marathi)
- Khare Dahashatavadi Kon (खरे दहशतवादी कोण, Marathi)
- Cubacha Zunzaar Kranti-Ladha (कुबाचा झुंझार क्रांतीलढा, Marathi)
