= Herbert Nootbaar =

American businessman (1908–2016)

Herbert Victor Nootbaar (November 8, 1908 – December 18, 2016) was an American businessman who donated to various organizations and institutes. He was an Ellis Island Medal of Honor recipient.

== Early life ==
Herbert Nootbaar was born in Chicago, Illinois, on November 8, 1908, to parents Max and Minnie Nootbaar. His father was a German-born police officer of Dutch heritage. The family moved to California in 1920.

== Career ==
Nootbaar mainly worked in the agricultural sector, buying and selling grain and animal feeds. In the 1920s, he went to work for Taylor Milling Corporation, a successful feed and grain business in Los Angeles founded by J. Hartley Taylor. He married one of Taylor's two daughters, Dorothy, and moved up the ranks of the company. In the 1940s, Taylor Milling was sold to Ralston Purina (now owned by the Swiss company Nestlé). After J.H. Taylor's death in 1953, Herb and his wife, along with his sister-in-law Mary Barbara Taylor, inherited the family fortune. This allowed him to endow significant gifts to charities and organizations. He was the president of the National Grain & Feed Association. He was also the chairman of the San Gabriel Valley Council, in 1954-1955.

Nootbaar was a member of the World Affairs Council of Orange County. In the late 1990s, as a major donor for the completion of the Hall of Fame building and team offices of the University of Southern California baseball team at the Dedeaux Field, it was named the Herbert V. Nootbaar Baseball Office and Hall of Fame Complex. In 2007, he and his second wife Elinor created the Herbert and Elinor Nootbaar Institute on Law, Religion and Ethics at the Pepperdine University School of Law.

Nootbaar was an acquaintance of Ronald Reagan and donated to his presidential library in Simi Valley. He was awarded the Ellis Island Medal of Honor in 2014, which is given to immigrants (and their descendants) with significant contributions to the United States. He turned 108 years old on November 8, 2016, in Laguna Beach. He died a month later, on December 18.

== Personal life ==
Nootbaar was married twice. On June 4, 1930, Nootbaar married Dorothy Martha Taylor, the daughter of a grain producer for whom he worked. The couple had three children. A year after her death in 1982, he married his long-time employee Elinor W. Barker on January 30, 1983. She died on March 27, 2011, at the age of 87.

Herbert Nootbaar's great-grandson, Lars Nootbaar, is a professional baseball player who played for Japan in the 2023 World Baseball Classic, becoming the first player born outside the country to do so.
