= Mamoru Matsunaga =

Dominican Republic judoka

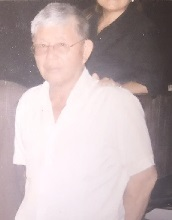

Personal information
- Nationality: Japanese
- Born: 30 September 1936; Kagoshima Prefecture, Japan
- Died: 20 December 2016 (aged 80); Santo Domingo, Dominican Republic
- Occupation: Judoka

Sport
- Sport: Judo
- Rank: 9th dan black belt

Mamoru Matsunaga (松永護, Matsunaga Mamoru, 30 September 1936 – 20 December 2016) was a ninth degree (kudan) judo sensei. Introducing the sport to the Dominican Republic after emigrating there in 1957, he was called "the father of Dominican judo". He was inducted into the Dominican Sports Hall of Fame in 2009.

Some notable Dominican judoka who trained with him include Juan Chalas, John Adams, and Desiderio Lebron. He is also well-known as a landscape designer, creating the Japanese garden in the Dr. Rafael Ma. Moscoso National Botanical Garden in Santo Domingo and redesigning the landscaping around the famous Monumento de Santiago.
