= Cecil Bødker =

Danish writer (1927–2020)

- Born: 27 March 1927; Fredericia, Denmark
- Died: 19 April 2020 (aged 92); Denmark
- Occupations: Young adult fiction, poetry
- Known for: Silas series
- Notable work: Øjet (The Eye)(1961)- as Cecil Skar, Leoparden (1970), Silas series
- Awards: Hans Christian Andersen Award (1966), Danish Critics Prize for Literature (Kritikerprisen) (1961), Batchelder Award

Cecil Bødker (27 March 1927 – 19 April 2020) was a Danish writer and poet, most known for young adult fiction books about the character "Silas". For her "lasting contribution to children's literature" she received the international Hans Christian Andersen Medal for Writing in 1976.

== Biography ==
Bødker was born in Fredericia, Denmark in 1927.

In 1955 she had her first poems published under the pseudonym Cecil Skar. In 1961 she debuted with the collection of novellas Øjet (The Eye), all treating the condition of human existence estranged from nature. The dystopian critique of civilization continued in Tilstanden Harley (The condition Harley) (1965) and Pap (Cardboard) (1967).

== Awards ==
The biennial Hans Christian Andersen Award conferred by the International Board on Books for Young People is the highest recognition available to a writer or illustrator of children's books. Bødker received the writing award in 1966.

In Denmark she won the annual Danish Critics Prize for Literature (Kritikerprisen) in 1961 and won the Ministry of Culture's children book prize (Kulturministeriets Børnebogspris) in 1968 for Silas og den sorte hoppe. In 1998 she won the Grand Prize of the Danish Academy for her body of work as a writer.

The English-language edition of Leoparden (1970), translated by Gunnar Poulsen and published by Atheneum Press in 1976, won the annual Batchelder Award from the American Library Association as the "children's book considered to be the most outstanding of those books originally published in a foreign language in a foreign country, and subsequently translated into English and published in the United States".

== Works ==
- 1955 Luseblomster (poem)
- 1956 Fygende heste (poem)
- 1956 Generationer (poem)
- 1959 Anadyomene (poem)
- 1961 Øjet (novel)
- 1964 Latter (hearing game)
- 1964 Samlede digte (Collected ed.)
- 1965 Tilstanden Harley (novel)
- 1967 Pap (radioplay)
- 1967 Silas og den sorte hoppe (Young adult)
- 1968 I vædderens tegn (poem)
- 1969 Silas og Ben-Godik (Young adult)
- 1969 Timmerlis (Young adult)
- 1970 Leoparden (The Leopard, Young adult)
- 1971 Dimma Gole (Young adult)
- 1971 Fortællinger omkring Tavs
- 1971 Kvinden som gik bort over vandet (radioplay)
- 1972 Salthandlerskens hus
- 1972 Silas fanger et firspand (Young adult)
- 1972 Skyld (Acting)
- 1974 En vrangmaske i Vorherres strikketøj
- 1975 Barnet i sivkurven
- 1975 Da jorden forsvandt
- 1975 Far, mor og børn (acting)
- 1975 Jerutte fra Ræverød (Young adult)
- 1975 Jerutte redder Tom og Tinne (Young adult)
- 1976 Jerutte og bjørnen fra Ræverød (Young adult)
- 1976 Silas stifter familie (Young adult)
- 1977 Cecil Bødker – et udvalg (udvalg)
- 1977 Den udvalgte
- 1977 Jerutte besøger Hundejens (Young adult)
- 1977 Silas på Sebastianbjerget (Young adult)
- 1978 Silas og Hestekragen mødes igen (Young adult)
- 1979 Silas møder Matti (Young adult)
- 1980 Evas ekko
- 1980 Flugten fra Farao
- 1981 Tænk på Jolande(Beautiful story telling about the growth of the quiet, shy girl Emilie when she meets her inner self in the strong, adventures girl Jolande)
- 1982 Den lange vandring
- 1982 Syv år for Rakel
- 1983 Marias barn. Drengen
- 1984 Marias barn. Manden
- 1984 Silas – livet i bjergbyen (Young adult)
- 1985 Silas – de blå heste (Young adult)
- 1986 Silas – Sebastians arv (Young adult)
- 1987 Ægget der voksede (Young adult)
- 1988 Maria fra Nazaret
- 1988 Silas – ulverejsen (Young adult)
- 1989 Vandgården
- 1990 Hungerbarnet (Young adult)
- 1990 Malvina
- 1991 Jordsang (poem)
- 1992 Silas – testamentet (Young adult)
- 1993 Tørkesommer (novel)
- 1995 - men i hvert fald i live (Young adult)
- 1996 Fru Hilde (Young adult)
- 1997 Farmors øre
- 1997 Mens tid er
- 1998 Silas og flodrøverne (Young adult)
- 2001 Silas – fortrøstningens tid (Young adult)
- 2003 Siffrine
