= John Swaab =

Dutch equestrian

Personal information
- Nationality: Dutch
- Born: 28 October 1928; Amsterdam, Netherlands
- Died: 4 December 2016 (aged 88)

Sport
- Sport: Equestrian

John Swaab (28 October 1928 – 4 December 2016) was a Dutch equestrian. He competed in two events at the 1972 Summer Olympics.
