= Aron Flam =

Swedish writer, comedian and podcaster

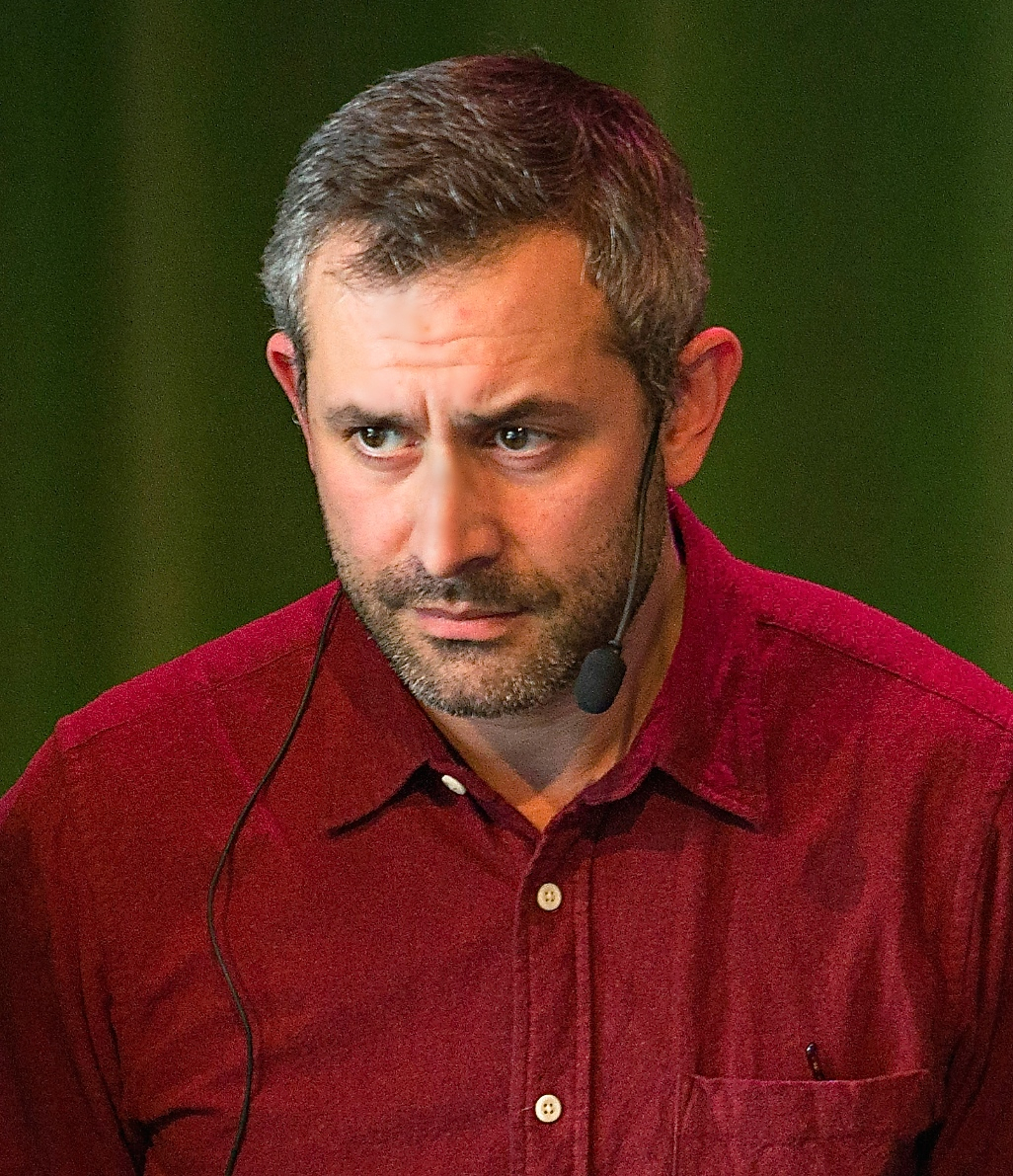
- Flam during a seminar at Kulturhuset in May 2015
- Born: 12 June 1978 (age 48); Bergshamra, Solna, Sweden
- Education: Stockholm University
- Relatives: Harry Flam (father)

Comedy career
- Years active: 2007–present
- Medium: Stand-up, television, podcast
- Website: aronflam.com

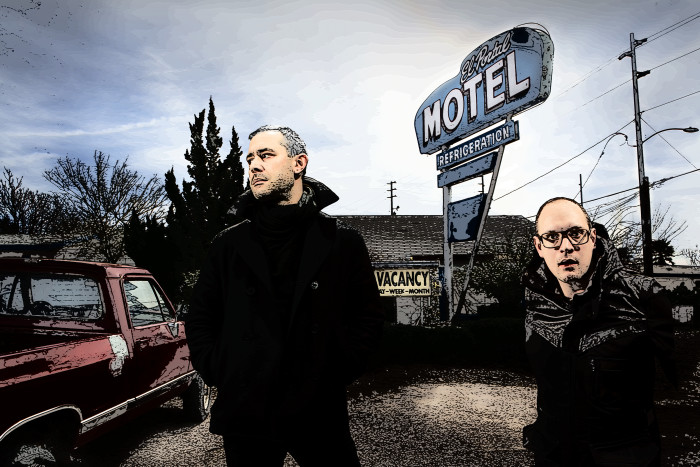
Aron Flam and Jonatan Unge before the standup tour called Super Epic Mega Sweet Titans of Comedy conducted together with Ahmed Berhan and Branislav Pavlovic in 2015.

Aron Flam (Swedish pronunciation: [ˈɑ̌ːrɔn ˈflamː]; born 12 June 1978) is a Swedish writer, stand-up comedian, podcaster, and occasional actor.

Flam started his career in stand-up comedy in his hometown of Stockholm in 2007 and was awarded the "Rookie of the Year" award in 2009 at the Swedish stand-up gala. He was co-host of the podcast Till slut kommer någon att skratta alongside fellow Swedish comedians Soran Ismail and Petter Bristav. He was the host of SVT Play's political satire web series Folkets främsta företrädare.

Since 2016, Flam is hosting his own podcast, Dekonstruktiv kritik, in which he conducts interviews in Swedish or English with invited guests on a wide range of topics.

== Early life and education ==
Flam was born in the Solna Municipality of Stockholm to Harry Flam, a professor of economics at the Institute for International Economic Studies at Stockholm University, and Eva Meyersohn. He is of Jewish origin and has spoken frequently on this in his stand-up comedy routines. Flam attended the prestigious Enskilda Gymnasiet in Stockholm, where he participated in the social science program. After high school, he attended Stockholm University and graduated with a bachelor's degree in film studies. He subsequently obtained a master's degree in financial economics at Stockholm University.

== Career ==
=== Stand-up ===
Aron Flam debuted in 2007 as a stand-up comedian in the competition at the Stockholm Comedy Club, which he attended with his friend and colleague Jonatan Unge, with whom he had previously written the book Sista ordet: citat och fakta om döden. Flam won the competition and the following year, 2008, he won the award "Komikaze of the Year". The following year he became the winner in the category "Rookie of the Year" during the Swedish stand-up gala. He has performed at clubs including Stockholm Comedy Club, Norra Brunn, and the television show RAW.

=== Podcasts ===
In October 2010, started Aron Flam podcast Till slut kommer någon att skratta (TSKNAS), along with comedian Soran Ismail and Petter Bristav. In January 2012, however, he left the podcast due to burnout, but later returned in March of the same year.

In spring 2015, Flam formed a stand-up tour called SEMST of Comedy (Super Titan Epic Mega Sweet of Comedy), together with comic colleagues Jonatan Unge, Branislav Pavlovic and Ahmed Berhan. The tour started in Malmö on 9 April 2015 and concluded in Stockholm on 3 May 2015.

Aron Flam also operates a stand-up club "Till slut kommer alla onekligen att skratta" ( "TSKAOS"), together with the comics Soran Ismail and Petter Bristav.

==== Dekonstruktiv kritik ====
In January 2016, Flam started his own podcast, Dekonstruktiv kritik ("Deconstructive Criticism"), in which he conducts long-format interviews in Swedish or English with an invited guest on a wide range of topics. Some of the topics are, or have been, considered sensitive, controversial or even taboo to examine or criticize in the public discourse in Sweden. Some recurring topics are free speech, drugs, immigration, feminism, socialism, politics, comedy, academia, and Sweden during World War II. As of July 2023, 280 episodes have been produced. The podcast is published on several platforms like Acast, SoundCloud and YouTube and is (2017) considered one of the most financially successful podcasts in Sweden.

The podcast has attracted numerous guests, both Swedish- and English-speaking: Public intellectuals, writers, comedians, politicians, and academics.

Guests

Some of the interviewed guests are:

- Alexander Bard (miscellaneous topics)
- Martin Wallström
- Petra Mede (humour and philosophy)
- Makode Linde (art, comedy and drugs)
- David Nutt (psychedelic drugs)
- Hanif Bali (immigration and racism, Sweden's policy on drugs)
- Magnus Norell (Muslim Brotherhood, Islamic State)
- Dave Rubin (Rubin Report)
- Omar Makram (atheism)
- Cassie Jaye (The Red Pill)
- Brendan O'Neill (alt-left)
- Christina Hoff Sommers (feminism)
- Harald Eia (Hjernevask)
- Ann Heberlein
- Charles Grob (drugs)
- Christer Sturmark (faith and science)
- Ivar Arpi (equality, academic freedom)
- Mattias Svensson
- Charlotta Stern (gender scientists)
- Gad Saad (antisemitism)
- Jörgen Huitfeldt
- Katerina Janouch
- Jonatan Spang
- Malcom Kyeyune
- Henrik Jönsson
- Adam Cwejman
- Mattias Svensson
- Andrew Doyle
- Michael Soussan
- Magnus Henrekson
- Lars Vilks
- Ivar Arpi
- Lorentz Tovatt
- Flemming Rose
- Bilan Osman
- Ola Wong (Groupthink, Sweden, China)
- Jan Emanuel Johansson (Swedish Social Democratic Party)
- Einar Askestad (Logos)
- Lena Andersson (Liberalism)
- James A. Lindsay (the Grievance studies affair)
- Konstantin Kisin (Russia)
- Benjamin R. Teitelbaum (Traditionalism)
- Jonathan Conricus (information war and politics)
- Ari Shaffir

=== Film and television ===
In 2005, Flam appeared in the TV3 program Rivalerna as one of the 12 participants. He dropped out immediately, however, because he felt that the program was an "incompetent production."

He has also appeared in VAKNA! med The Voice and starred in the television program Grillad. In spring 2010, he starred in Nyheter24's comedy program "Någonting annat" alongside Soran Ismail.

Beside his stand-up career, Flam has also starred as an actor in the 2011 feature film Certain People by Levan Akin and Lisa Östberg and played Death in Michael Rendell's 2012 short film When the Man Comes Around.

Aron Flam is one of the writers for Kanal 5's Kristallen-winning program Betnér Direkt. The same year he was also the editor of Jag bombade, an anthology concerning life as a stand up comedian.

In autumn 2013, the first season of Flam's self-produced program Folkets främsta företrädare aired on SVT Play. Folkets främsta företrädare is an infotainment television series with satire on various parts of the Swedish government and similar topics. Flam speaks to the camera, together with others including David Druid and Henrik Dorsin. The program began its third season in autumn 2015, in a partially new format. The third season has longer episodes and is recorded weekly with a greater focus on news and current affairs.

=== Det här är en svensk tiger ===
In 2020, Flam published a book titled Det här är en svensk tiger ("This is a Swedish Tiger") which addresses the official policies of Sweden during World War II. In the book, Flam claims that under the guise of neutrality Sweden assisted the German war effort intentionally and consistently. He casts Swedish efforts to save Jews from Nazi persecution as insignificant, and criticizes the appraisal of these efforts by many historians as highly exaggerated.

Swedish prosecutors seized the entire third print run of the book (2,000 copies), claiming that the cover of the book contained an image of the symbol En svensk tiger, a tiger sporting Sweden's national colors of blue and yellow, infringed on the copyright of the image. The image was part of a war-time information campaign now owned by the Swedish Military Preparedness Museum (Beredskapsmuseet). The matter was presented to court on 24 September 2020, and ignited some debate in Swedish media on censorship and the boundaries of satire. Flam was found not guilty by the Swedish courts.

== Politics ==
In August 2026, he revealed that he intended to vote for the Citizens' Coalition in the upcoming municipal and regional elections, and the anti-immigration Sweden Democrats in the general election due to the perceived threat from Islamic Antisemitism.

== Bibliography ==
- Flam, Aron (red.) (2019). Det här är en svensk tiger [This is a Swedish tiger] (in Swedish). Stockholm: Samizdat Publishing. ISBN 978-9-198-56330-6. OCLC 1263660844.
- Flam, Aron (red.) (2012). Jag bombade: scener ur ett ståuppliv [I Bombed: Scenes from a Stand-Up Life] (in Swedish). Stockholm: Ekerlids. ISBN 978-91-7092-206-0.
- Flam, Aron; Unge, Jonatan (2006). Sista ordet: citat och fakta om döden [Last Word: Quotations and Facts About Death] (in Swedish). Stockholm: Norstedts. ISBN 91-1-301585-0.
