= Heberlein =

Heberlein is a surname. Notable people with the surname include:

- Ann Heberlein (born 1970), Swedish academic and author
- Heinrich Th. Heberlein Jr. (1843–1910), German violin maker
- Trix Heberlein (born 1942), Swiss politician

== See also ==
- Heberlein brake
