= Det här är en svensk tiger =

Book by Aron Flam

- First edition cover
- Author: Aron Flam
- Audio read by: Aron Flam
- Cover artist: Tomas Arfert
- Language: Swedish
- Subjects: Sweden during World War II; Swedish History
- Publisher: Samizdat Publishing
- Publication date: August 2019
- Publication place: Sweden
- Media type: Print (paperback), e-book, audiobook
- Pages: 559
- ISBN: 978-9-198-56330-6
- OCLC: 1263660844
- Preceded by: Jag bombade: scener ur ett ståuppliv

Det här är en svensk tiger (English: This is a Swedish tiger, formerly stylized in all caps) is a 2019 book written by Aron Flam. The book is made with sources and claims made in a podcast series with the same name; which was a part of Flam's main podcast Dekonstruktiv kritik.

The book's subject is Sweden, the Swedish government's role before, during, and after World War II and Swedish trade with Nazi Germany as well as the denial of this involvement by the Swedish authorities.

Flam was accused of copyright infringement on the basis that the title of the book was paraphrasing En svensk tiger (the copyright of which is owned by Beredskapsmuseet). Around 2,000 copies of the third edition were seized by the Swedish police.

== Podcast series ==
On 9 February 2018, Flam uploaded the first episode of the series which was originally called En svensk tiger, as a part of his podcast Dekonstruktiv kritik. After episode three, the podcast changed its name to Det här är en svensk tiger after pressure by Beredskapsmuseet. In total, nineteen episodes were published, the last of which was published on 10 May 2019.

== Book ==
Flam reworked the content in the podcast series to a book that was published in August 2019 via his own publisher Samizdat Publishing.

=== The cover ===
The cover of the book was designed by Tomas Arfert.

During the spring and summer of 2020, the book received attention due to the cover of the book which is a parody/satire of Bertil Almqvist's drawing En svensk tiger for the SIS (Statens Informationsstyrelse, English: The State's Information Board) during World War II. Almqvist's drawing represents a blue and yellow tiger. Beredskapsmuseet claimed that Flam's version was plagiarism.

Flam's version depicts the same blue and yellow tiger, winking and raising its right paw with an armband on its left foreleg featuring a swastika.

In June 2020, Flam was prosecuted for copyright infringement regarding the cover. On 11 June 2020, the police seized 2,282 copies (1.5 tons) of the book's third edition directly from the warehouse of Samizdat Publishing AB in Bromma.

Beredskapsmuseet claimed damages of originally (SEK) 250,000, which was later increased to SEK 1.5 million, as well as a fine for repeated use of the banned version of the cover.

The Court for Intellectual Property and the Market at Stockholm District Court, ruled on 5 August 2020 that the book seizure was still in action. However, The Court of Appeal for Intellectual Property and the Market lifted the seizure on 13 August 2020.

The verdict came on 9 October 2020, where Flam was acquitted by a unanimous court with reference to the parody exception Flam commented on the verdict together with Johan Westerholm and Liselott Agerlid in an episode of his podcast.

== Reception ==
The historian Mikael Nilsson claims that Flam's book contains lies, misuse of facts and plagiarism.

== See also ==
- Sweden during World War II
- Aron Flam
