= Careless Talk Costs Lives =

Careless Talk Costs Lives may be:

- Careless Talk Costs Lives (propaganda), a propaganda campaign by the British government during the Second World War
- Careless Talk Costs Lives (magazine), a music magazine
