= Loose lips sink ships (disambiguation) =

Loose lips sink ships is an American World War II propaganda slogan which became an English idiom.

Loose Lips Sink Ships may also refer to:

- "Loose Lips Sink Ships", a song by Camper van Beethoven from the album Camper Van Beethoven Is Dead. Long Live Camper Van Beethoven
- "Loose Lips Sink Ships", a song by A Change of Pace from the album An Offer You Can't Refuse
- "Loose Lips Sink Ships", a song by Hit the Lights from the album Until We Get Caught
- Loose Lips Sink Ships, a musical play produced by the American Folklore Theatre
- "Loose Lips Sink Ships", an episode of the American television program Survivor: Heroes vs. Villains

== See also ==
- Loose Lips (disambiguation)
