= Loose lips sink ships =

American idiom

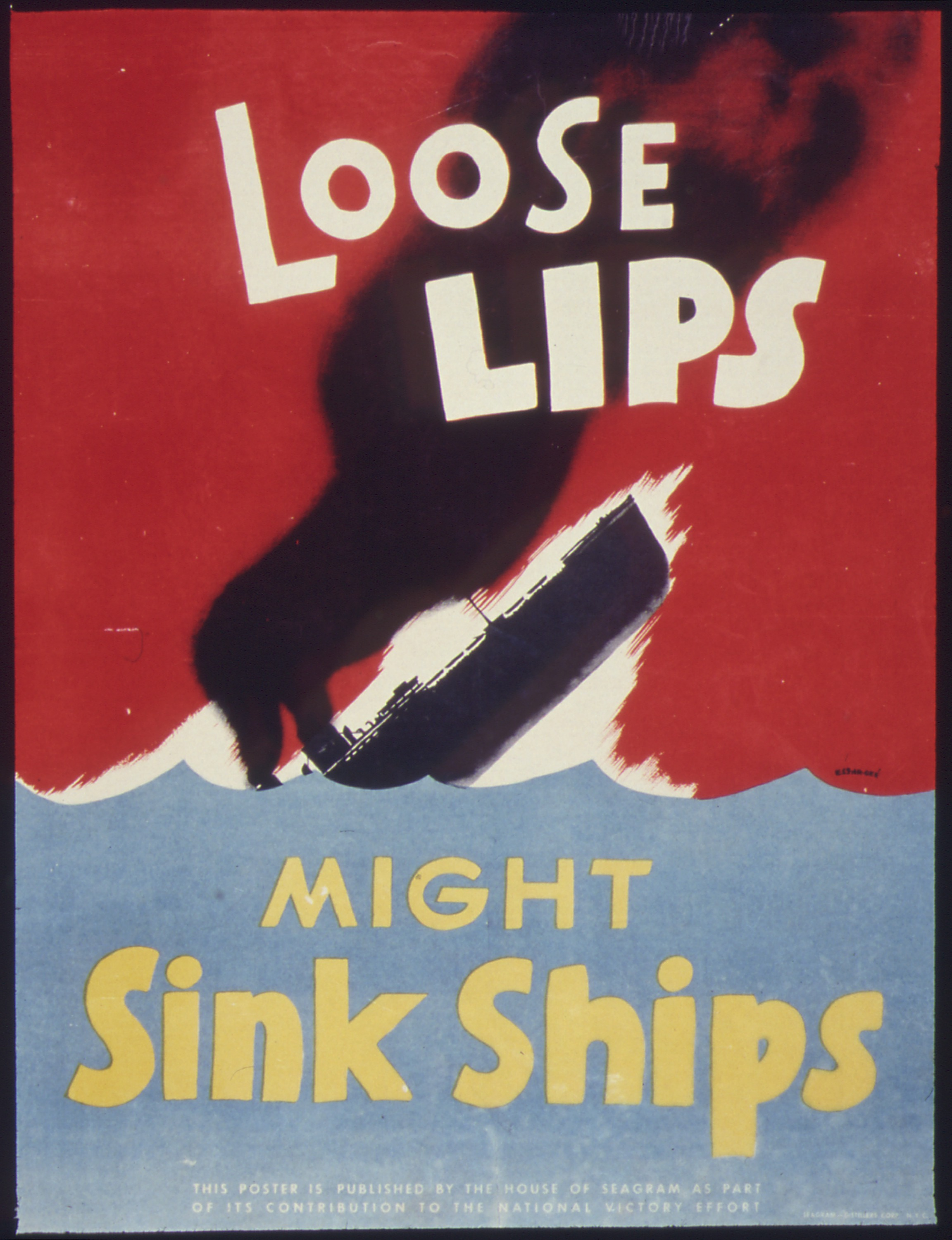
World War II poster by Seymour R. Goff. This was the first poster to use some variation of the phrase. It was published by the Canadian Seagram Distillers Corporation for posting in bars.

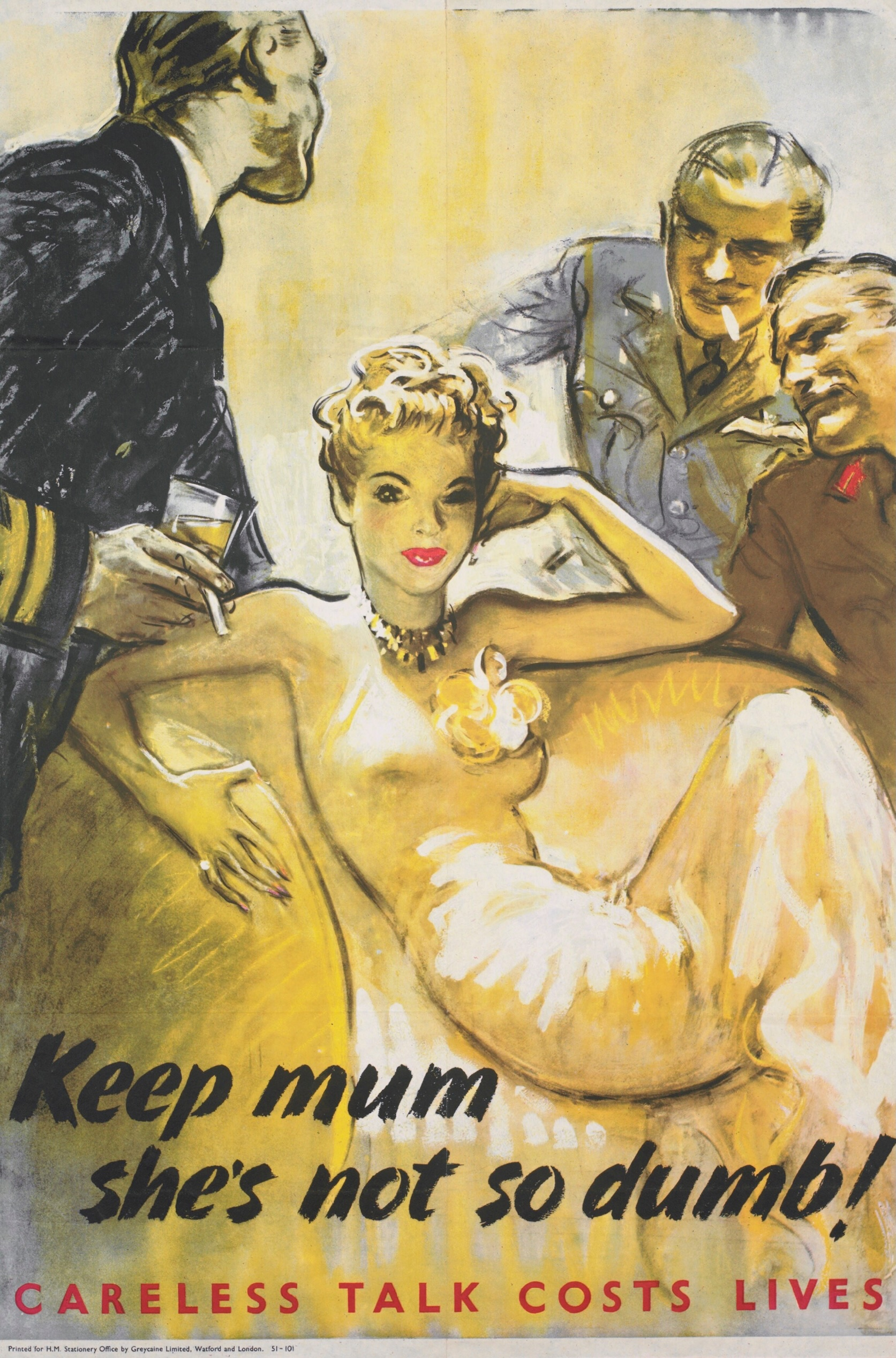
A similar British poster admonishing readers to "keep mum"

Loose lips sink ships is an American English idiom meaning "beware of unguarded talk". The phrase originated on posters during World War II, with the earliest version using the wording loose lips might sink ships. The phrase was created by the War Advertising Council and used on posters by the United States Office of War Information.

This type of poster was part of a general campaign to advise servicemen and other citizens to avoid careless talk that might undermine the war effort. There were many similar such slogans, but "Loose lips sink ships" has persisted as an American idiom into the present, usually as an admonition to avoid careless talk in general. The British equivalent used "Careless Talk Costs Lives", and variations on the phrase "Keep mum", while in neutral Sweden the State Information Board promoted the wordplay "En svensk tiger" ("A Swedish tiger" or "A Swede keeps silent": the Swedish word "tiger" means both "tiger" and "keeps silent"), and Germany used "Schäm Dich, Schwätzer!" (English: "Shame on you, blabbermouth!").

However, propaganda experts at the time and historians since then have argued the main goal of these campaigns was really just to frighten people from spreading rumors (even true ones) containing bad news that might hurt morale or create tension between groups of Americans, since the Federal Bureau of Investigation (in charge of dealing with enemy spies) had rounded up key German agents in June 1941, and the nation "entered the war with confidence that there was no major German espionage network hidden in U.S. society." From the White House's perspective, the FBI had succeeded in virtually ending the German espionage threat. Historian Joseph E. Persico says it "practically shut down German espionage in the United States overnight."

Historian D'Ann Campbell argues that the purpose of the wartime posters, propaganda, and censorship of soldiers' letters was not to foil spies but "to clamp as tight a lid as possible on rumors that might lead to discouragement, frustration, strikes, or anything that would cut back military production."

== See also ==
- Andrew J. May § The May Incident
- Operations security
- Information security
- Loose Lips (disambiguation), usually an anapodoton (shortening) of this phrase
- En svensk tiger
- Careless Talk Costs Lives (propaganda)
- "A Slip of the Lip (Can Sink a Ship)"
