= Barna Hedenhös uppfinner julen =

- Genre: children
- Written by: Oskar Mellander; Jonathan Sjöberg; Torbjörn Jansson; Mike Syrén
- Starring: Fredde Granberg, Sissela Benn
- Country of origin: Sweden
- Original language: Swedish
- No. of seasons: 1
- No. of episodes: 24

Original release
- Network: SVT1; Barnkanalen
- Release: 1 December – 24 December 2013

Related
- Mysteriet på Greveholm – Grevens återkomst (2012); Piratskattens hemlighet (2014)

Barna Hedenhös uppfinner julen ("The Hedenhös Children invent Christmas") was the Sveriges Television's Christmas calendar in 2013. It was recorded in Stockholm. Based on the Barna Hedenhös stories set in the Stone Age, the main setting is located to Stockholm in an alternate 2013, where Christmas does not exist yet. It won the Kristallen 2014 award as "children and youth programme of the year".
