= Ratio Institute =

Swedish research institute

Ratio
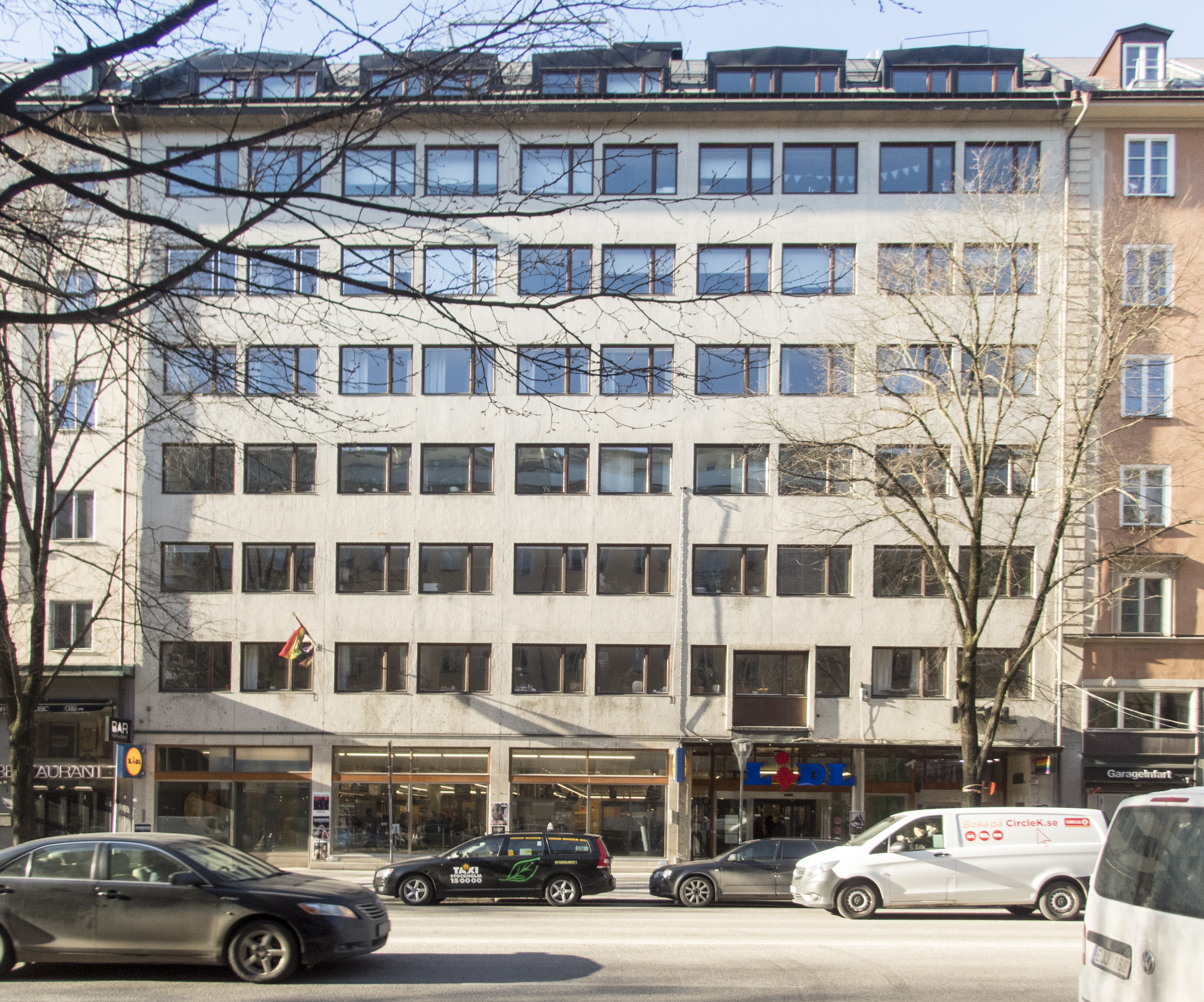
- Sveavägen 59, where Ratio's offices are located
- Founder: Nils Karlson
- Established: 2002
- Chair: David Johnsson
- CEO: Charlotta Stern
- Address: Sveavägen 59
- Location: Stockholm, Sweden
- Website: https://ratio.se/en/

The Ratio Institute is an independent Swedish research institute focusing on the conditions for enterprise, entrepreneurship and market economy and political change. The institute's infrastructure is financed by the Confederation of Swedish Enterprise, but various research projects have financiers like the Wallenberg Foundation.

Ratio was established as a publishing house within the think tank Timbro (a subsidiary of the Swedish Free Enterprise Foundation) in 1978. The Ratio institute was founded in 2002, and formed as a non-profit organisation in 2004.
