= Barna Hedenhös =

Swedish children's book and comic

- Author: Bertil Almqvist
- Country: Sweden
- Language: Swedish
- Genre: children
- Published: 1948-

Barna Hedenhös (The Hedenhös Children) is the name of a series of Swedish children's books in the 1950s written by Bertil Almqvist. The story is set in the Stone Age and follows the Hedenhös family. Barna Hedenhös is mostly known as a book series, but Almqvist also made an (albeit limited) animated television series about the Hedenhös family that was broadcast on SVT in 1972. Additionally, Almqvist made a comic version of the Hedenhös books for the comic book Tuff och Tuss during the 1950s; the comic version was later remade for the Pelle Svanslös children's comic book in the 1970s.

== Story ==
The books tell the story of the Swedish family Hedenhös, consisting of the father Ben, mother Knota, and their two children Sten and Flisa, and their dog Urax. The family also has a horse called Hårfagre and a cow called Mura. The books contain both actual events and fantasy episodes.

In all of the stories, the Hedenhös family invents or comes up with things that are known in the modern world today. As an example, the Hedenhös family moves to an island they call "Stockholmen" – the implication being that it was the Hedenhös family that established and was the first to live in present-day Stockholm, Sweden. Another example is that the Hedenhös family launches the "Urlympiska spelen" ("Protolympic Games") and takes part in it, thus being revealed to be a predecessor to the modern Olympic Games.

== Racism accusations ==
Some of the Barna Hedenhös books have been accused of being racist. For example, dark-skinned people in the books are referred to by terms that are considered offensive today. In 2013 Bonnier Carlsen temporarily halted its re-release of the books as Barna Hedenhös upptäcker Amerika (The Hedenhös Children Discover America) since the 1950 publications refer to Native Americans as "rödskinn" ("red skins"). A new text was inserted in the section concerning the first interactions between the Hedenhös family and the Native American tribe, so it would not cause offence.

== Sveriges Television's Christmas calendar ==
In 2013 it was revealed that Barna Hedenhös would be the 2013 feature on the SVT Christmas calendar TV series for children, broadcast by Sveriges Television, and would premiere on 1 December on SVT. The series was named Barna Hedenhös uppfinner julen (The Hedenhös Children Invent Christmas).

== Book series ==
- 1948: Barna Hedenhös: bilder från stenåldern
- 1949: Barna Hedenhös reser till Egypten
- 1950: Barna Hedenhös upptäcker Amerika
- 1950: Barnens dag i Hedenhös (picture book)
- 1951: Barna Hedenhös på vinterresa i Sverige
- 1952: Barna Hedenhös och de urlympiska spelen
- 1953: Barna Hedenhös åker bananbåt till Kanarieöarna
- 1954: Barna Hedenhös blir kungliga
- 1955: Barna Hedenhös i världsrymden
- 1957: Barna Hedenhös reser till Paris
- 1962: Barna Hedenhös bakom stenridån
- 1969: Barna Hedenhös på Mallorca
- 1971: Barna Hedenhös besöker England

Compilations

- 1991: Den stora boken om barna Hedenhös
  - Barna Hedenhös
  - Barna Hedenhös reser till Egypten
  - Barna Hedenhös upptäcker Amerika
  - Barna Hedenhös åker bananbåt till Kanarieöarna
  - Barna Hedenhös reser till Paris
- 1992: Barna Hedenhös på nya äventyr
  - Barna Hedenhös på vinterresa i Sverige
  - Barna Hedenhös och de urlympiska spelen
  - Barna Hedenhös i världsrymden
  - Barna Hedenhös på Mallorca
  - Barna Hedenhös besöker England

== Others ==
- 1996: Barna Hedenhös på Stockholmen (multimedia)
- 1997: Barna Hedenhös hittar hem (after the film Barna Hedenhös bosätter sig i Sverige)
