= Harry Flam =

Swedish economics professor (born 1948)

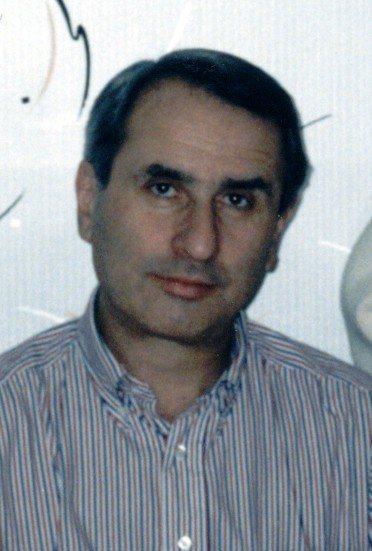
Harry Flam circa 1995.

Harry Flam (born 1948) is a professor of international economics at the Institute for International Economic Studies at Stockholm University. During the years of 2004 and 2006, he was Dean of the School of Business at Stockholm University. His main area of research is international trade and European economic integration. He is the father of comedian Aron Flam.

He was chair of the Swedish Fiscal Policy Council in 2017 and 2018. He wrote a chapter for the book Leva livet: Hälsa, mat och välmående för andra halvan av livet, which was published in 2020. As of 2024, Flam was a professor emeritus of Stockholm University.
