= Piratskattens hemlighet =

- Genre: children
- Written by: Sofie Forssman; Ida Kjellin
- Starring: Buster Isitt; Alexandra Breschi; Lea Stojanov; Ana Gil de Melo Nascimento; Mirja Turestedt; Michalis Koutsogiannakis; Nives Ivanković
- Countries of origin: Sweden; Croatia
- Original language: Swedish
- No. of seasons: 1
- No. of episodes: 24

Original release
- Network: SVT1; Barnkanalen
- Release: 1 December – 24 December 2014

Related
- Barna Hedenhös uppfinner julen (2013); Tusen år till julafton (2015)

Piratskattens hemlighet ("The Secret of the Pirate Treasure", "The Lost Treasure of Aquila") is the Sveriges Television's Christmas calendar in 2014. It was recorded in Croatia between March–May 2014.

== Plot ==
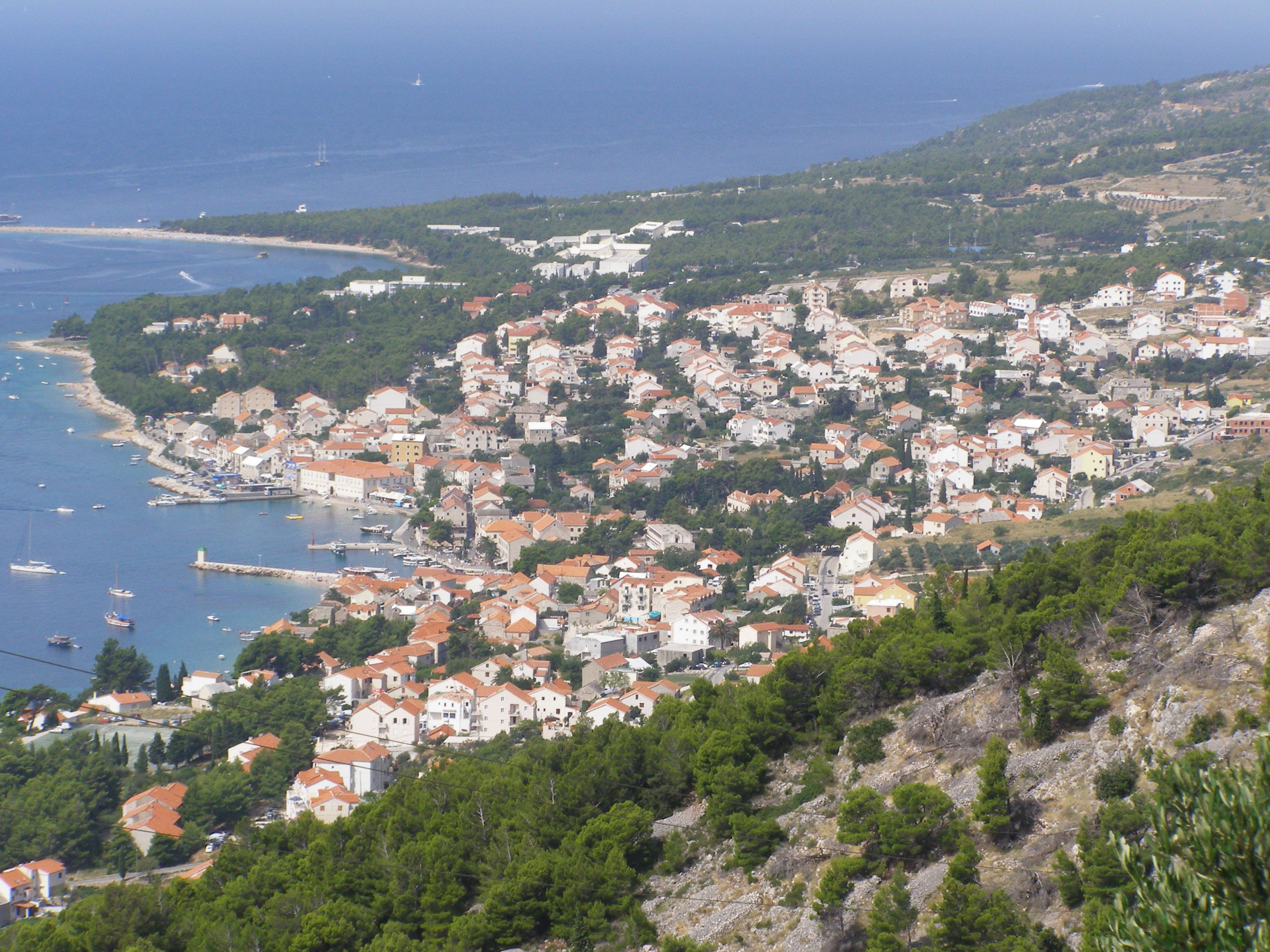
The series was filmed on the island of Brač.

The story is set in Croatia.
