= En svensk tiger =

Element of Swedish WWII propaganda

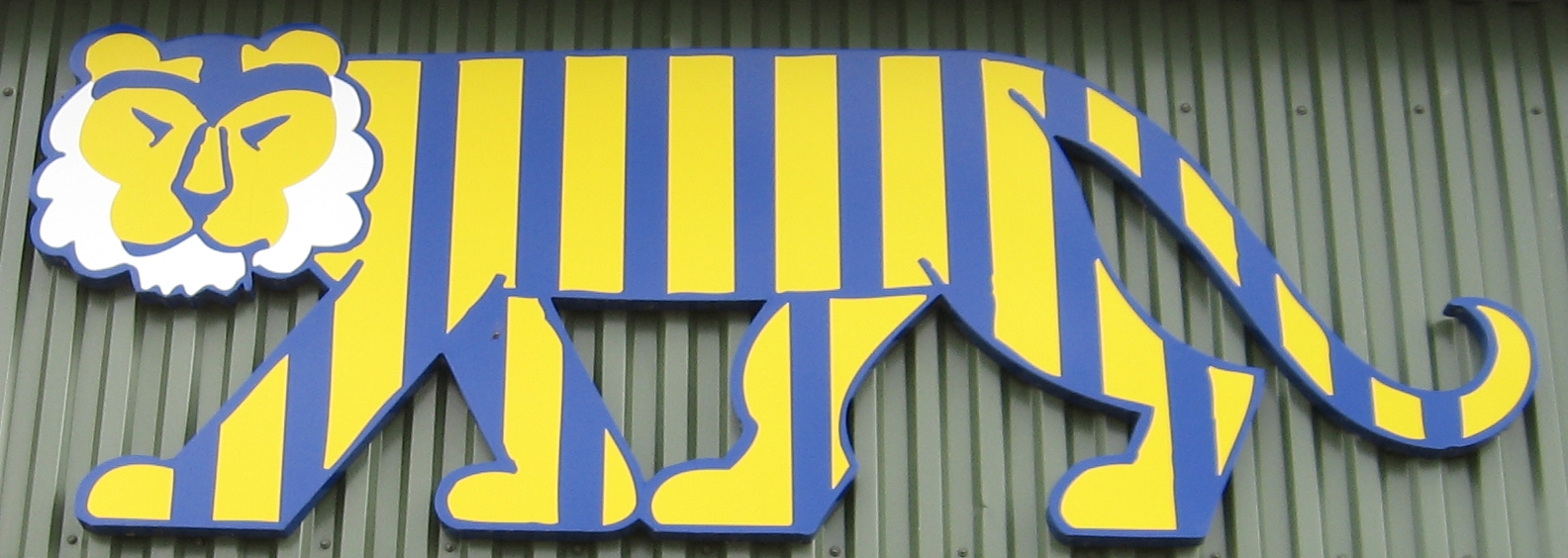
The famous propaganda poster warned Swedes to be wary of speaking.

En svensk tiger (Swedish: [ɛn ˈsvɛnːsk ˈtǐːɡɛr]) was a slogan and an image that became part of a propaganda campaign in Sweden during World War II. Its goal was to prevent espionage by encouraging secrecy.

== Explanation ==
In Swedish, the word svensk can mean both the adjective "Swedish" and the noun "Swede" while tiger can mean either the noun for a tiger (the animal) or the present tense of the verb tiga ("to keep silent", or more colloquially to "keep one's mouth shut"), giving the poster the double meaning "a Swedish tiger" or "a Swede keeps silent". The phrase is comparable in use to "loose lips sink ships" in the United States and with "careless talk costs lives" and other similar wartime slogans in the United Kingdom.

== Commission and use ==
The famous poster for the propaganda campaign was created by Bertil Almqvist in 1941, commissioned by the Swedish National Board of Information (Swedish: Statens informationsstyrelse, SIS). The poster became the main slogan of the Vaksamhetskampanjen (English: "Swedish Vigilance Campaign") that was started in the same year to encourage secrecy about information that could possibly damage Swedish national security.

== Legal battle ==
Almqvist died in 1972 and in 2002 the copyright of the poster/logo was transferred to Beredskapsmuseet, a military readiness museum. After eleven years of legal battle, the Swedish Armed Forces, who had been using the image without permission, paid 700 000 SEK in damages to the copyright owners in 2008.

In 2020, the Swedish satirist Aron Flam was prosecuted for copyright infringement after using a variant of the image in his book Det här är en svensk tiger (English: "This is a Swedish tiger").

== See also ==
- MUST (Militära underrättelse- och säkerhetstjänsten)
- Loose lips sink ships
- Careless Talk Costs Lives (propaganda)
