= Loose Lips =

Loose Lips may refer to:

- Loose Lips (column), a newspaper column in Washington City Paper
- Loose Lips (TV series), a British former talk show
- "Loose Lips", a song on the album Remember That I Love You by Kimya Dawson
- Loose Lips (novel), a novel by Rita Mae Brown

== See also ==
- Loose lips sink ships (disambiguation)
