= Christer Sturmark =

Swedish author, entrepreneur and debater (born 1964)

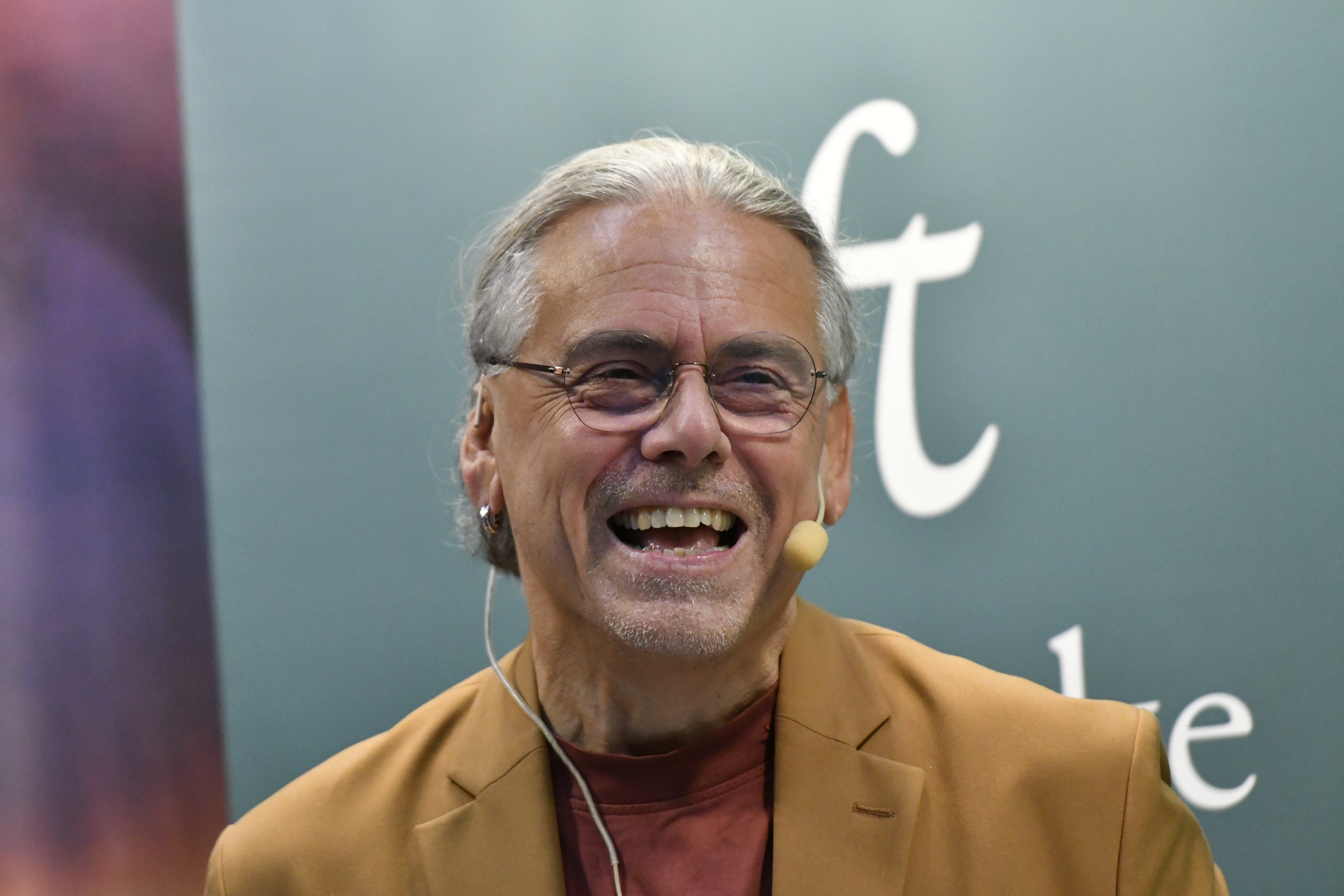
- Born: 7 September 1964; Danderyd
- Occupation: Writer

Nils Gösta Christer Sturmark, born 7 September 1964 in Danderyd, Stockholm County, is a Swedish author, IT-entrepreneur and prominent debater on religion and humanism in Swedish media.

He is the CEO of publishing house Fri Tanke, a Secular Humanist and former chairman of the Swedish Humanist Association, Humanisterna.

== Career ==
Sturmark enrolled on a master's degree in computer science at Uppsala University with the aim of starting research in artificial intelligence. Instead, he dropped out of the semester to become an entrepreneur.

During his studies, he worked extra on the side teaching people how to use computers, and in 1989, Sturmark started the computer training company Datamedia, which among other things published several hundred books about different programmes for personal computers. At its peak, the company had 60 employees. When the internet took off in Sweden in the mid-1990s, Sturmark released the first Swedish book about the internet: Internet@Sverige (1996).

During the IT boom of the mid and late 1990s, Sturmark became one of the most well-known faces of the public debate that surrounded it. In 1996, together with Jan Carlzon, he started the company Cell Network, offering consulting solutions for new e-commerce businesses. Cell Network expanded and was sold after a couple of years to English New Media Spark and was then listed on the stock exchange. In 1999, Christer Sturmark left the company after disagreements over the company’s leadership. Cell Network was valued in February 2000 at almost SEK 20 billion on the Stockholm stock exchange. Around the same time, just before the IT bubble burst, Sturmark sold his shares in the company.

In parallel with his entrepreneurial ventures, he wrote articles in Dagens Nyheter, one of Sweden’s biggest daily newspapers, about the emerging information society. Sturmark has also served in a number of roles on government commissions and advice boards. Between 1996 and 1998 he was a member of the Government's IT Commission, in 1999 he chaired an advisory growth group on the new digital economy and between 2003 and 2004 he led the Government's IT Policy Strategy Group.

In 2006, Sturmark ran in the parliamentary elections for the Liberal People's Party but was not elected.

In 2007, Sturmark started the publishing house Fri Tanke together with ABBA member Björn Ulvaeus. Sturmark is the CEO of Fri Tanke and editor-in-chief of its magazine, Sans. Between 2005 and 2018, he was chairman of the Humanists Association.
