= Einar Askestad =

Swedish writer

- Born: 22 March 1964 (age 61); Kalix, Sweden
- Occupation: Author

Einar Askestad (born 22 March 1964) is a Swedish author.

== Biography ==
Askestad was raised in Portugal, Spain, Austria and Sweden. He made his debut in 1997 with the collection of short stories Det liknar ingenting. He has published prose and poetry as well as essays and articles in several magazines, published in Sweden, Finland and Norway. He has been awarded by the Swedish Academy in 2001, 2014 and 2018.

== Bibliography ==
- Askestad, Einar (1997). Det liknar ingenting. MBM Förlag. ISBN 9197372528.
- Askestad, Einar (1999). På helig mark. MBM Förlag. ISBN 9197372501.
- Askestad, Einar (2001). Ögon för paradiset. MBM Förlag. ISBN 9197372544.
- Askestad, Einar (2003). Med blicken i trasor. MBM Förlag. ISBN 9197372560.
- Askestad, Einar (2004). Tankedikt 1:1. MBM Förlag. ISBN 919737251X.
- Askestad, Einar (2007). Kalla mig Theodora. Förlag: H:ström Text Kultur. ISBN 9789173270359.
- Askestad, Einar (2009). Kvinnohistorier. MBM Förlag. ISBN 9789197724944.
- Askestad, Einar (2010). Frånfällen. MBM Förlag. ISBN 9789186505011.
- Askestad, Einar (2012). Skolastiska övningar. MBM Förlag. ISBN 9789186505288.
- Askestad, Einar (2014). Nya ordstäv. MBM Förlag. ISBN 9789186505431.
- Askestad, Einar (2018). Så enkla är orden. MBM Förlag. ISBN 9789186505585.
- Askestad, Einar (2020). Ting. MBM Förlag. ISBN 9789186505622.
