= Heinrich Th. Heberlein Jr. =

Heinrich Theodore Heberlein Jr. (1843-1910) was a German violin maker from the Vogtland region that straddles modern day Germany and the Czech Republic. He was the son of Carl August Heberlein (1805-1879) and the grandson of the founder of the family dynasty Johann Gottlob Heberlein (1782-1856). The Heberlein workshop was located in Markneukirchen. He was possibly the first instrument maker to combine his craft with business savvy. More than one dozen medals were awarded to him at various exhibitions in Europe. According to Dr Annette Roeben of German violin experts Corilon Violins, Heberlein was "the most famous member" of this important family of luthiers and was "renowned for the excellent quality of his instruments and was awarded multiple honours, including Knight of the Saxonian Albrecht Order."

Heberlein was especially known for his use of varnish to achieve an artistic effect, the quality of his wood, and the verisimilitude of his imitations of old masters, such as Stradivarius. According to writer and violinist William Henley, he produced, "Fine imitations of the old masters' traits, all perfectly homogeneous, and particularly admirable are the warm tints of the different varnishes as well as his unique way of giving to them an old and well worn appearance. Quality of wood never varies, impossible to detect the smallest defect. Pre-eminently succeeded in imparting a splendidly clear tone, one without the slightest harshness."

The Rudolph Wurlitzer Company of Cincinnati and Chicago was Heberlein's main agent for many years, and in their catalogues, they would refer to him as "the greatest violin maker in Germany" with the "highest grades acknowledged to be the grandest tone instruments produced."
