= Bertil Almqvist =

Swedish author and illustrator

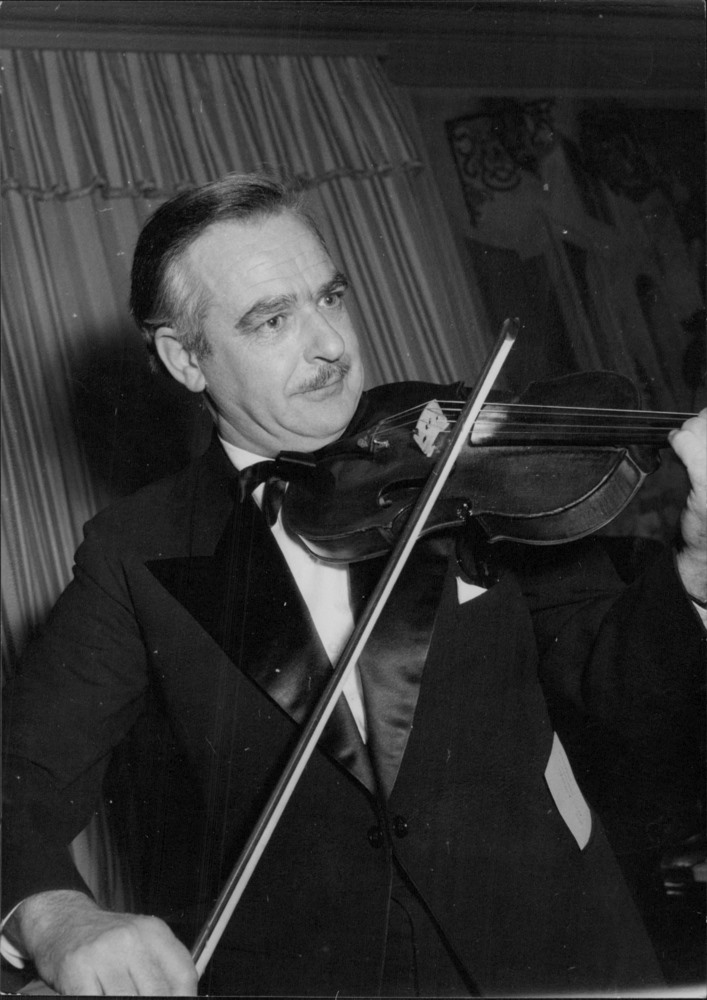
- Bertil Almqvist playing the violin, circa 1950
- Born: Allan Bertil Almqvist; 29 August 1902; Solna, Sweden
- Died: 16 May 1972 (aged 69); Stockholm, Sweden

Allan Bertil Almqvist (29 August 1902 – 16 May 1972), nicknamed Bertila and Trallgöken, was a Swedish writer and illustrator.

He is famous for his World War II-era En svensk tiger propaganda poster (which was one of the most recognized symbols in Sweden around this time period) as well as his children's book series, later comic, Barna Hedenhös (The Stone Age Kids Discover America, The Stones Explore Britain).

Almqvist studied literature in Stockholm and Uppsala from 1924 until 1925.

== See also ==
- Swedish literature
