= Henrik Jönsson =

Swedish entrepreneur and public debater

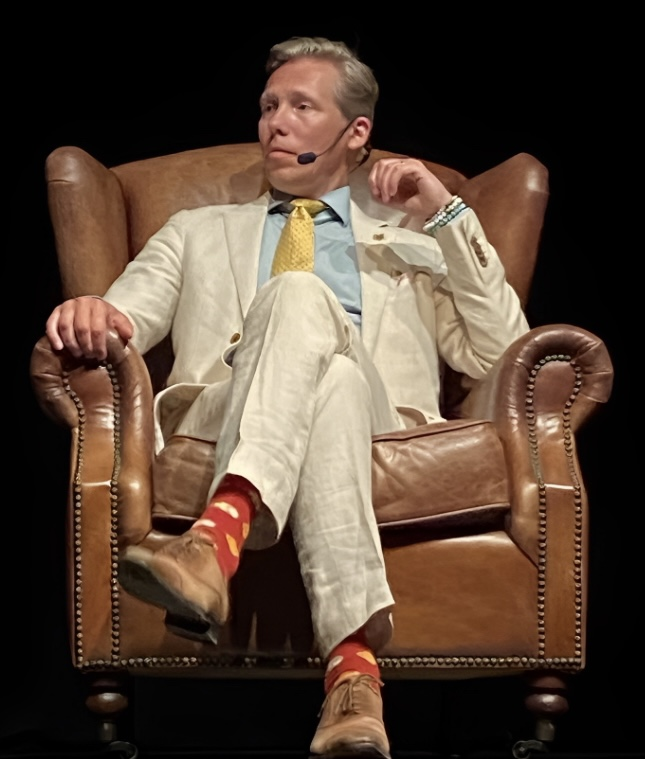
- Born: Henrik Olov Rickard Jönsson; 27 February 1975 (age 51); Malmö, Sweden
- Occupations: Entrepreneur; public debater
- Website: henrikjonsson.com

Henrik Olov Rickard Jönsson (born 27 February 1975) is a Swedish entrepreneur, YouTuber and right-wing public debater. He has described himself as a libertarian.

== Biography ==
Jönsson was educated at Lund University between 1997 and 2000. He studied communication and theology.

He started a company in 3D animation and worked for the company Atomic Arts in London between 2002 and 2009, working with the production of illustrations and visual effects.

Henrik Jönsson participated in the production of several films and TV series, including Abraham Lincoln: Vampire Hunter and Rise of the Planet of the Apes.

In 2009, he was involved in launching the company Divine Robot, in which he developed virtual reality simulations as well as designing and producing games on Apple Inc.'s iOS platform such as Blobster and Cotbot City.

Jönsson returned to Sweden in 2011 in order to co-found the company RestaurangOnline with the web service Hungrig.se. Hungrig.se won the DI Gasell award in 2017, hosted by Dagens industri. The web service was later sold to the company Delivery Hero in May 2019.

Since 2016, Jönsson has participated in the public debate on issues such as fraud, criminal violence in Malmö, the tax for sickness, technology in elections and the public media. He is also active via his YouTube channel "Henrik Jönsson", with over 93,000 subscribers, where he produces short films with information and opinion as well as inviting various guests.

In the fall of 2019, he launched Veckans Facit!, a satire program in collaboration with Svenska Dagbladet.

Between 2012 and 2015, Jönsson ran the company Divine Robot Limited in London, which was later closed down.

== Bibliography ==
- Jönsson, Henrik. Frihetligt självförsvar - Fälthandbok för individualister. Samizdat Publishing AB. ISBN 9789198563368.
