= Mattias Svensson =

Swedish writer and political commentator

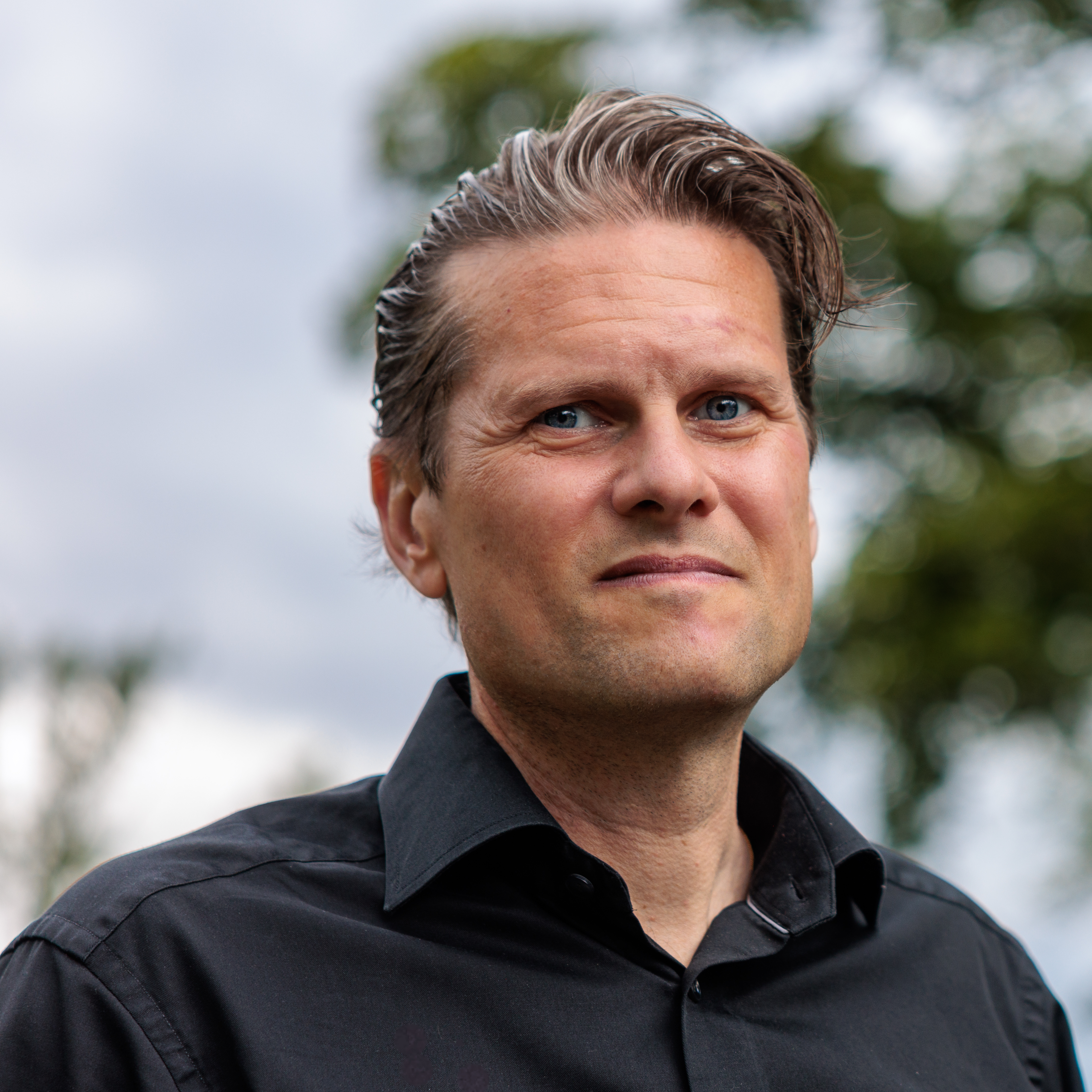
Mattias Svensson

Mattias Svensson (born 5 October 1972 in Karlskrona) is a Swedish libertarian writer and political commentator. He is currently a freelance writer and journalist, writing for several Swedish newspapers and magazines, including Dagens Nyheter and Aftonbladet. He used to work as an editor at the Swedish libertarian magazine Neo, which was closed down in 2015.

In his youth, Svensson was active in the Moderate Youth League, the youth wing of the Swedish Moderate Party. He holds a BA in political science and has previously worked at the organization Medborgare mot EMU ("Citizens against the EMU"), the Moderate Party's parliamentary offices, as a columnist in Metro (Stockholm edition) and as an editorialist in Svenska Dagbladet.

Svensson has written on subjects such as liberal ideology, the Austrian School of economics, the European Union, democracy and the 'nanny state'. He is the author of three books: Mer demokrati – mindre politik ("More Democracy – Less Politics", 2000), Peta inte i maten! ("Don't Poke in the Food!", 2005) and Glädjedödarna – en bok om förmynderi, 2010, all published by Timbro.
