= Ivar Arpi =

Swedish columnist and debater

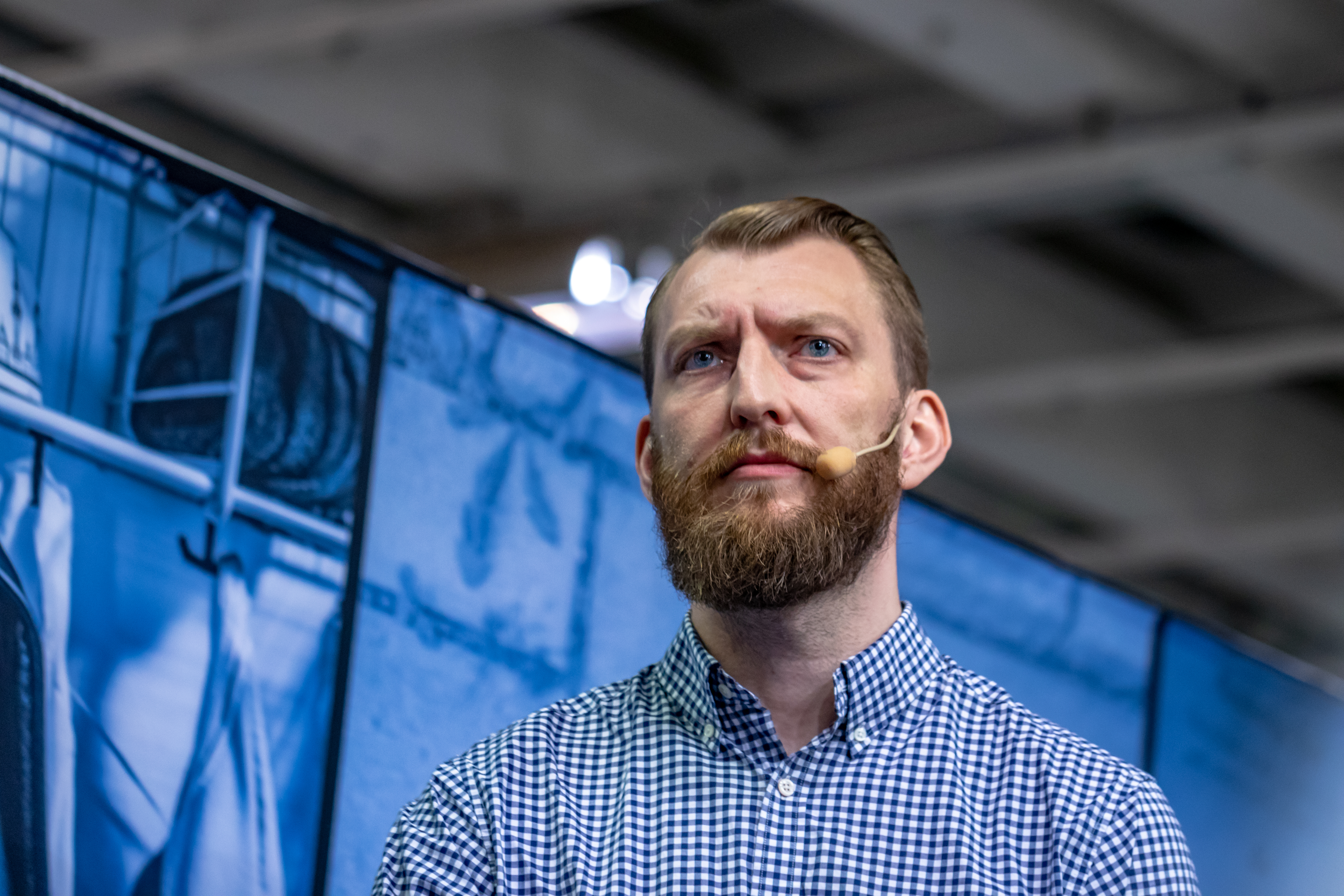
- Ivar Arpi, Gothenburg Book Fair 2018.
- Born: 21 November 1982 (age 43)
- Education: Political science at Uppsala University
- Known for: Co-writing "Så blev vi alla rasister" (Then we all became racists) with Adam Cwejman.

Ivar Arpi (born 21 November 1982) is a Swedish columnist and debater. He has written op-eds for Göteborgs-Posten, Hallandsposten and Svenska Dagbladet. Arpi claims that he supports freedom of speech and that he believes that pluralism of opinion is important for society to develop.

== Politics ==
Arpi grew up in a left-wing area in Majorna, Gothenburg. He called himself communist but turned right-wing after protests during the EU summit in Gothenburg 2001 and after the September 11 attacks. For this change he received much criticism. In an interview with Sveriges Radio he has stated that gender ideology is taking over the Swedish universities. Vetenskapsrådet criticized his stand. He has also criticized the demographic changes in Sweden which he was criticized for by Per Svensson of Dagens Nyheter. In 2016, Arpi published an article in Svenska Dagbladet criticizing transactivists for claiming "veto on the truth". Arpi has also been criticized for proposing a more strict asylum and migration politics. During the election of 2018 Arpi stated that one party leader would have to disappoint their voters. He has also criticized the United Nations critique to Sweden for allowing "organizations who support hate groups".

== Globalism and nationalism ==
Ivar Arpi is a strong opponent of globalism and has debated with reporters from Expressen who claimed his stand was "inappropriate". Arpi has stated that "the EU was invented for Europeans, not in order to take on asylum seekers". He has also supported Poland and Hungary's restricted migration policy and border customs. Arpi has also stated that the EU is tyrannical in its forcing of mass-migration. Ivar Arpi and with Adam Cwejman participated in a pod cast speaking of their book "Så blev vi alla rasister" which describes the political status quo in Sweden. Elina Pahnke of Sydsvenskan has insinuated that Ivar Arpi is afraid to allow Leila Ali Elmi, of the Green Party of Sweden, finish talking. Ivar Arpi has sharply criticized Alexandra Pascalidou for having spread disinformation in her articles about opinions which she attributed to Arpi.

== Bibliography ==
- Så blev vi alla rasister (with Adam Cwejman) (2018)
- Genusdoktrinen (with Anna-Karin Wyndhamn) 2020
