= Jörgen Huitfeldt =

Swedish journalist (born 1970)

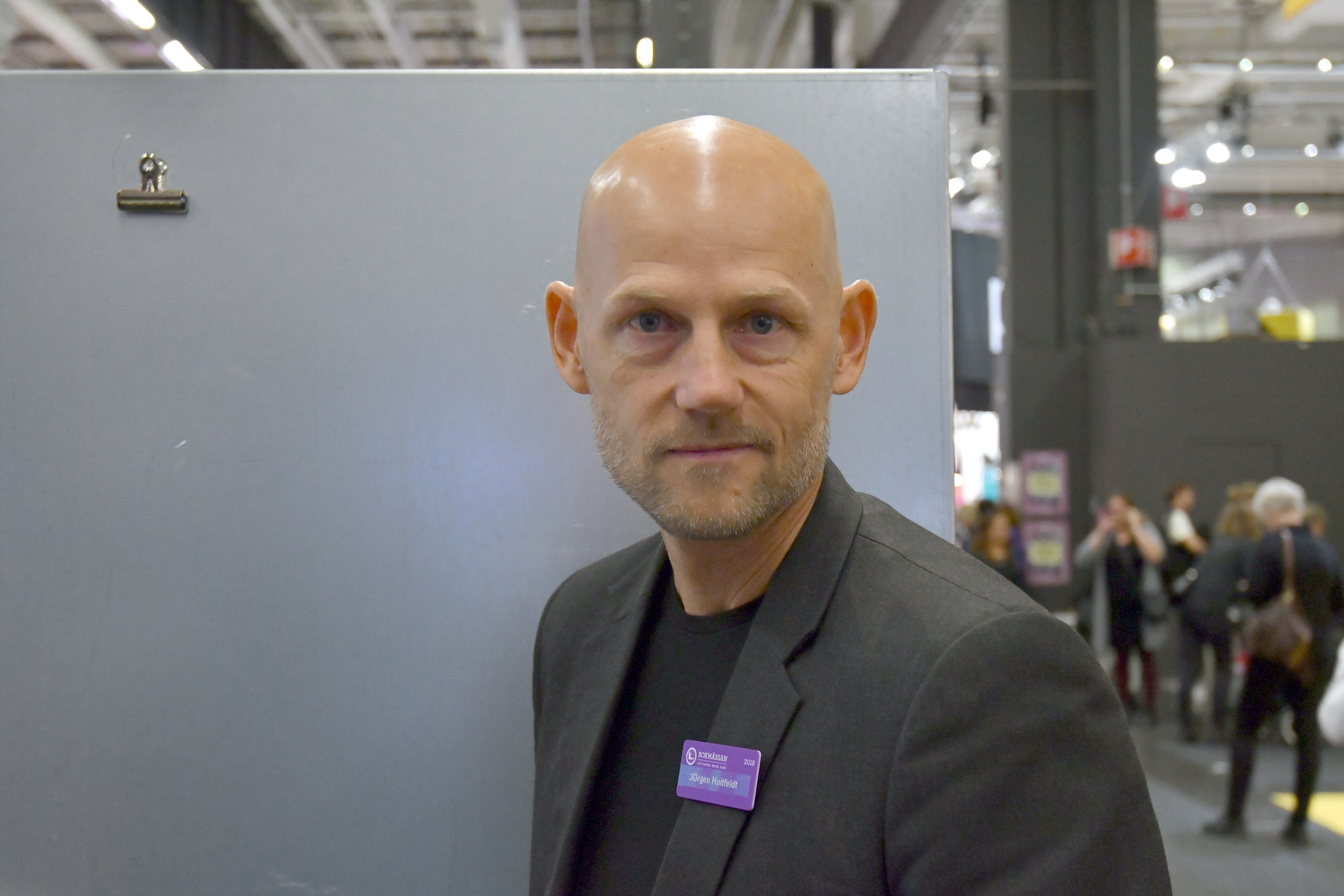
Huitfeldt at the 2018 Gothenburg Book Fair.

Jörgen Huitfeldt (born 10 March 1970) is a Swedish journalist.

== Education ==
Huitfeldt has studied German and history at Uppsala university in Sweden and Universität Tübingen in Germany. He also studied journalism, media and communication at JMK, Stockholm University.

== Work at Sveriges Radio ==
Huitfeldt worked 1998–2017 at Sveriges Radio Ekot, initially as a reporter and later as a producer and host for P1-morgon and Studio Ett.

During his time at Sveriges Radio P1, Huitfeldt established himself as one of the best interviewers in Sweden, and when he left to work at Kvartal he was one of P1's most celebrated profiles.

== Work at Kvartal ==
Since October 2017, Huitfeldt works at Kvartal, an independent media house, and since January 2019 Huitfeldt is editor-in-chief. He also conducts long format interviews in Fredagsintervjun and occasionally hosts the weekly program Veckopanelen.

The first guest in Fredagsintervjun was Sweden's former prime minister, Göran Persson, and the second was Sweden's former justice minister, Beatrice Ask, and among later guests of politicians, academics and writers (interviewed by Huitfeldt or his colleague Staffan Dopping) are Anders Borg, Andreas Norlén, Ann Linde, Jordan B Peterson, Mark Weiner, Matias Faldbakken, Terje Tvedt, P. C. Jersild and Ayaan Hirsi Ali.

== Awards ==
Huitfeldt has won several awards for his work. He has been nominated to Stora journalistpriset (The Swedish Grand Prize for Journalism) in 2006 and Guldspaden in 2009.

Since 2018 he is a member of the jury for Stora journalistpriset.

In 2022 the Swedish Skeptics Society awarded Huitfeldt Misleader of the Year Award 2021 with the rest of the jury for Stora journalistpriset for awarding a documentary about the Sinking of the MS Estonia Scoop of the Year, despite it being criticized for being conspiratorial. Part of the statement from the Swedish Skeptics Society was:

Despite solid journalistic experience, the jury of Stora Journalistpriset 2020 has considerably lacked in judgement regarding source criticism. Even though Henrik Evertsson's documentary clearly is using conspiratorial thinking, and that manipulation of government documents has taken place, the jury did either not notice this, or chose to look the other way regarding warning signals that they had been alerted to. Regardless, the prize should not have been awarded to Evertsson for a documentary that so blatantly lacks foundation for its claims.
