= Ola Wong =

Swedish author, journalist and sinologist

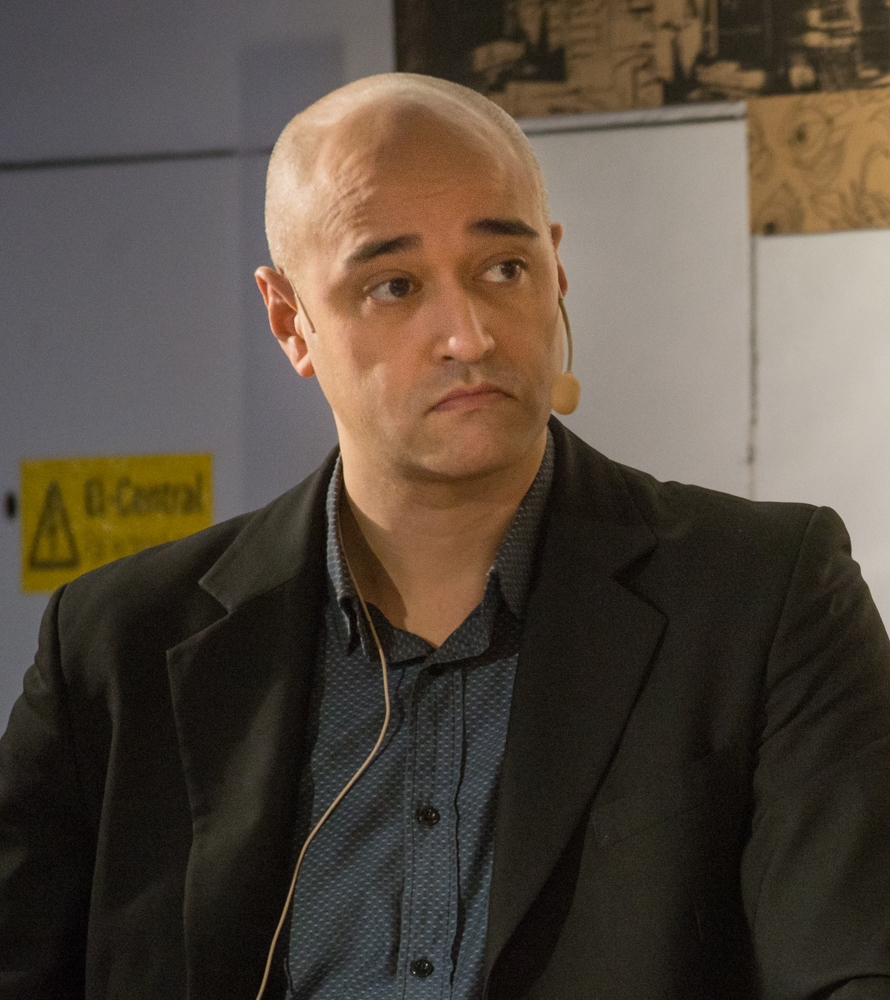
- Wong in 2018
- Born: Ola Rui-Lai Wong; 6 January 1977 (age 48); Borås, Sweden
- Occupation(s): Author, journalist, sinologist

Ola Rui-Lai Wong (Chinese: 王瑞来; pinyin: Wáng Ruìlái; born 6 January 1977) is a Swedish author, journalist and sinologist.

Wong has worked for Svenska Dagbladet, as well as for other media outlets. Wong is of Chinese descent and previously served as a vice-chairman for the Shanghai Foreign Correspondents Club.

Since 2019 Wong is editor for Kvartal.

== Career ==
Since 2002, Wong has been active as a correspondent in China for approximately twelve years, where he was based in Shanghai and Beijing. During his career, Wong has written and published several books and articles on subjects regarding China, such as politics, environment, foreign policy, culture and economics. He is also an expert commentator, who frequently appears in Swedish radio and television.

== Personal life ==
Born to a Chinese father and a Swedish mother, Wong is married and resides in Hägersten, Stockholm.

== Bibliography ==
- No, I'm from Borås (2004) – Ordfront
- När tusen eldar slickar himlen: Kinas väg till framtiden (2007) – Ordfront
- Sjukt billigt – Vem betalar priset för ditt extrapris? (2007) – Norstedts
- Blodröda kräftor. Jakten på Henry Wu (2010) – Lind & Co
- Pekingsyndromet – Kina, Makten, Pengarna (2014) – Ordfront

== Honours ==
- 2001 – Föreningen Grävande Journalisters prize – "Grävling" of the Year
- 2004 – Environmental Journalist of the Year
- 2007 – Swedish Red Cross journalism prize (shared with Jörgen Huitfeldt and Thella Johnson).
- 2007 – Stora radiopriset Public service of the Year (shared with Jörgen Huitfeldt and Thella Johnson).
- 2011 – Guldspaden (shared with Jan Almgren and Jonas Fröberg for the investigation of Invest Sweden).
