= Charlotta Stern =

Charlotta Stern (born 1967) is a professor of sociology at Stockholm University, who specializes in the sociology of work and organizations, and the CEO of the research institute Ratio.

Stern's research is mainly labor market-related. She is the principal investigator of Ratio's labor market program, the purpose of which is to study topics such as the future of work and challenges of the Swedish model.

Stern has also conducted research on the field of sociology of gender, and she argues that ideological like-mindedness in social psychology leads to a narrowing of perspectives and an impoverishment of the intellectual progress within that field. A paper she co-authored on this issue, "Political diversity will improve psychological science", has been cited as a motivator for the founding of the Heterodox Academy.
