= Careless Talk Costs Lives (propaganda) =

British propaganda campaign during World War II

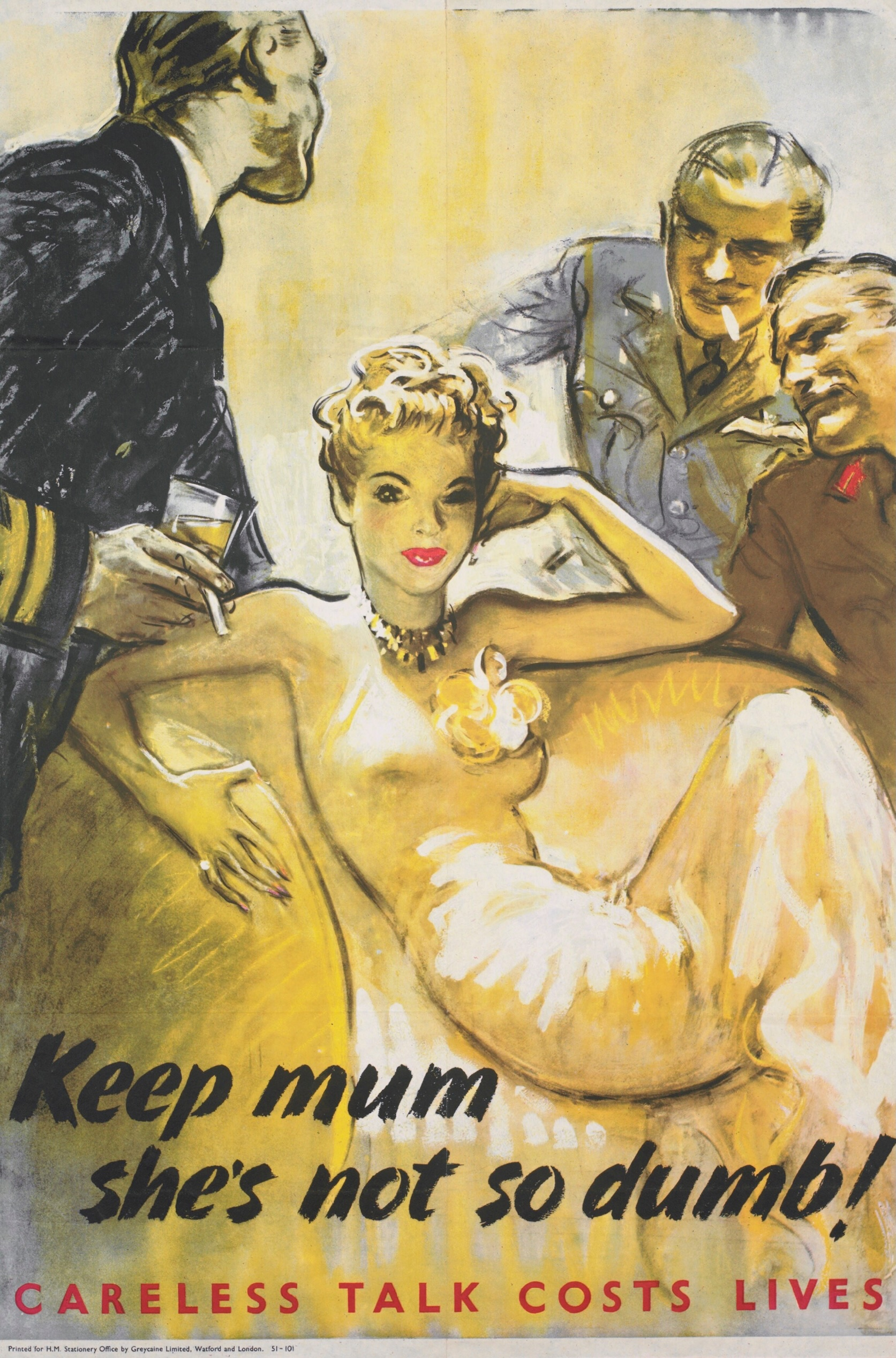
A version of the poster attributed to Harold Forster, 1942

"Careless Talk Costs Lives" was a British propaganda campaign during World War II meant to discourage open discussion of sensitive or secret military and intelligence operations among the Allied forces.

== History ==
=== Beginning of the campaign ===
The first posters in the series were illustrated by Cyril Bird, a comic artist who worked under the pen name "Fougasse."

=== Effectiveness ===
After concluding that such talk was not a serious source of intelligence, and suspicious persons would often be dismissed as plants, the British government did not increase funding for the campaign.

=== Content and legacy ===
The "Careless Talk Costs Lives" campaign was a highly effective and memorable part of Britain's World War II domestic propaganda, leaving a lasting cultural legacy as an iconic example of public information design. Designed primarily by cartoonist "Fougasse" (Cyril Kenneth Bird), the posters utilized humour, simple graphics, and direct language to encourage vigilance against espionage. The campaign successfully fostered a pervasive public sense of shared responsibility for national security, with simple, memorable slogans like "Keep Mum, She's Not So Dumb" entering the public lexicon. While historians debate the actual intelligence impact of "casual talk," the campaign is remembered for influencing later security initiatives and providing powerful historical artefacts of wartime communication. The phrase itself endures today as a common idiom for the dangers of unguarded conversation.

== Gallery ==
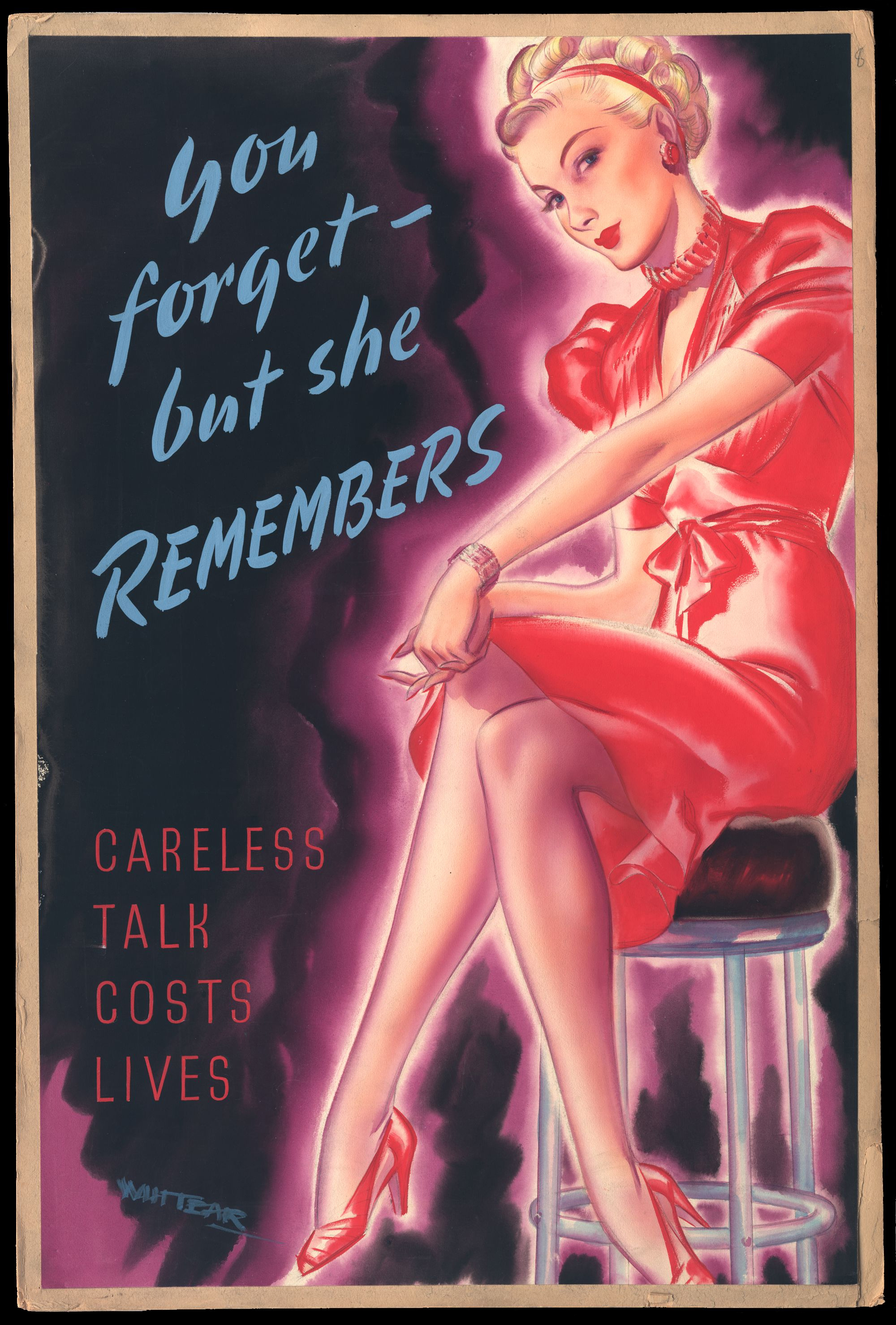

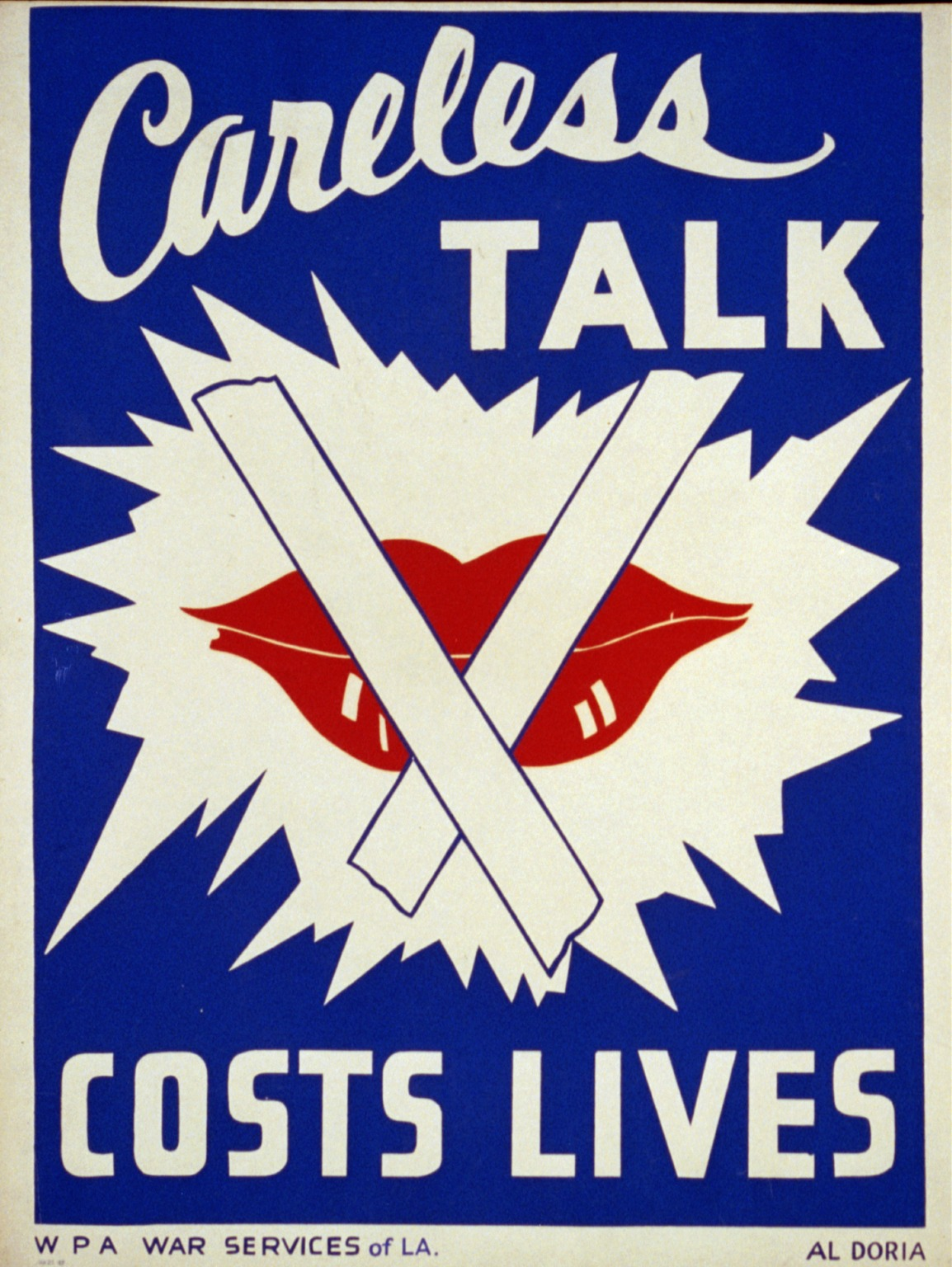

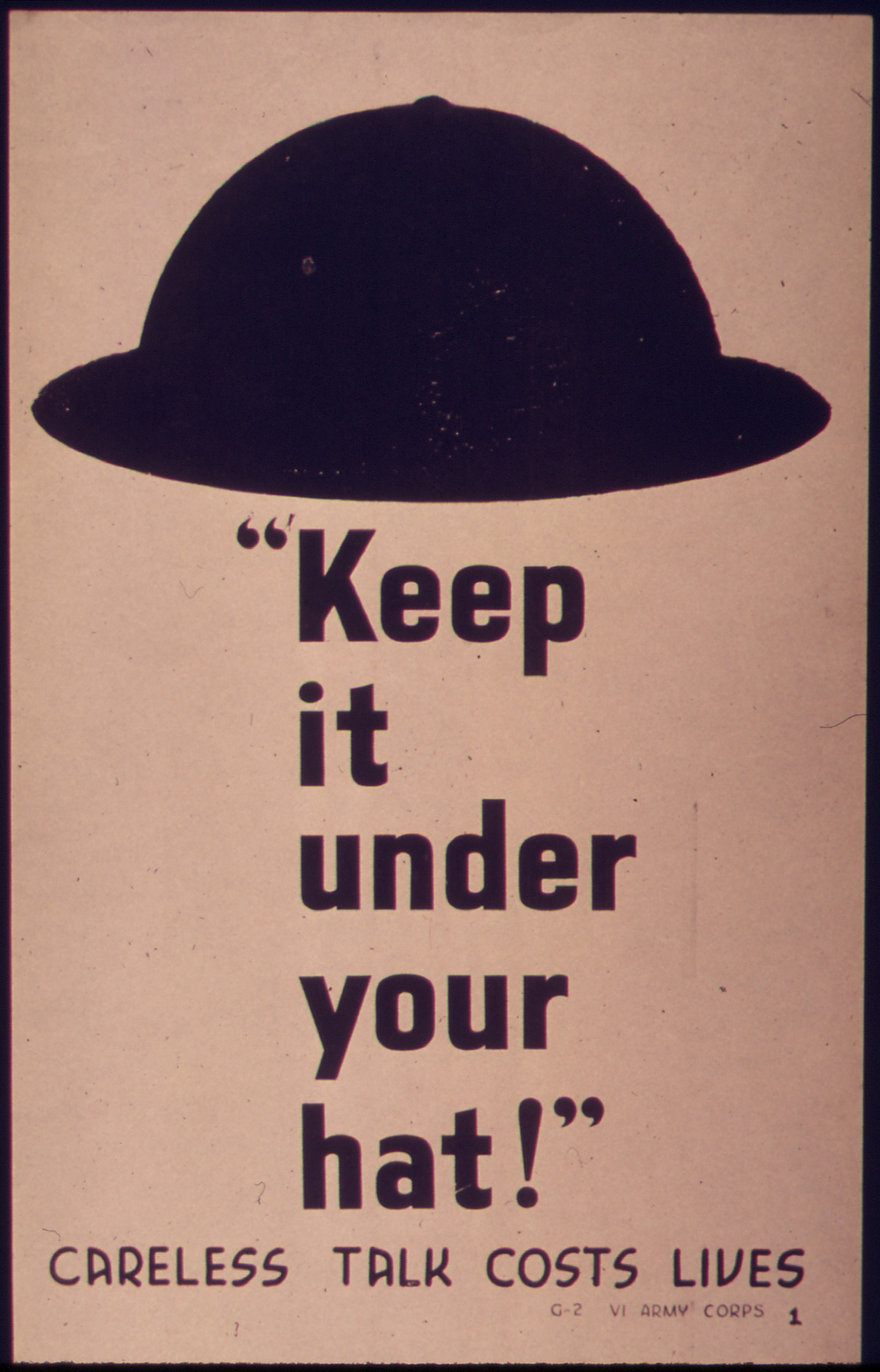

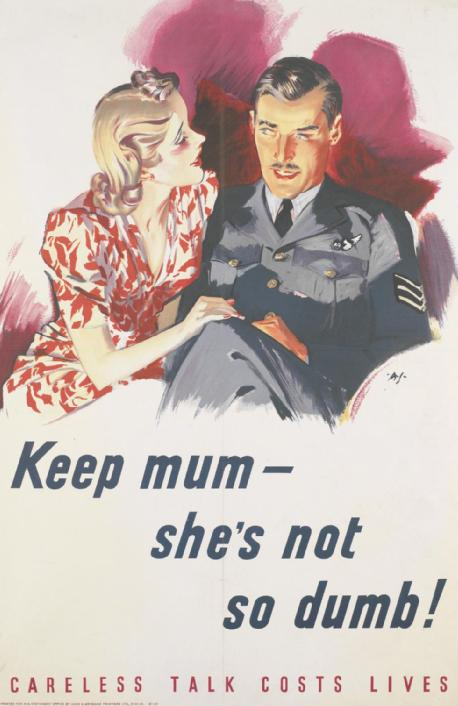

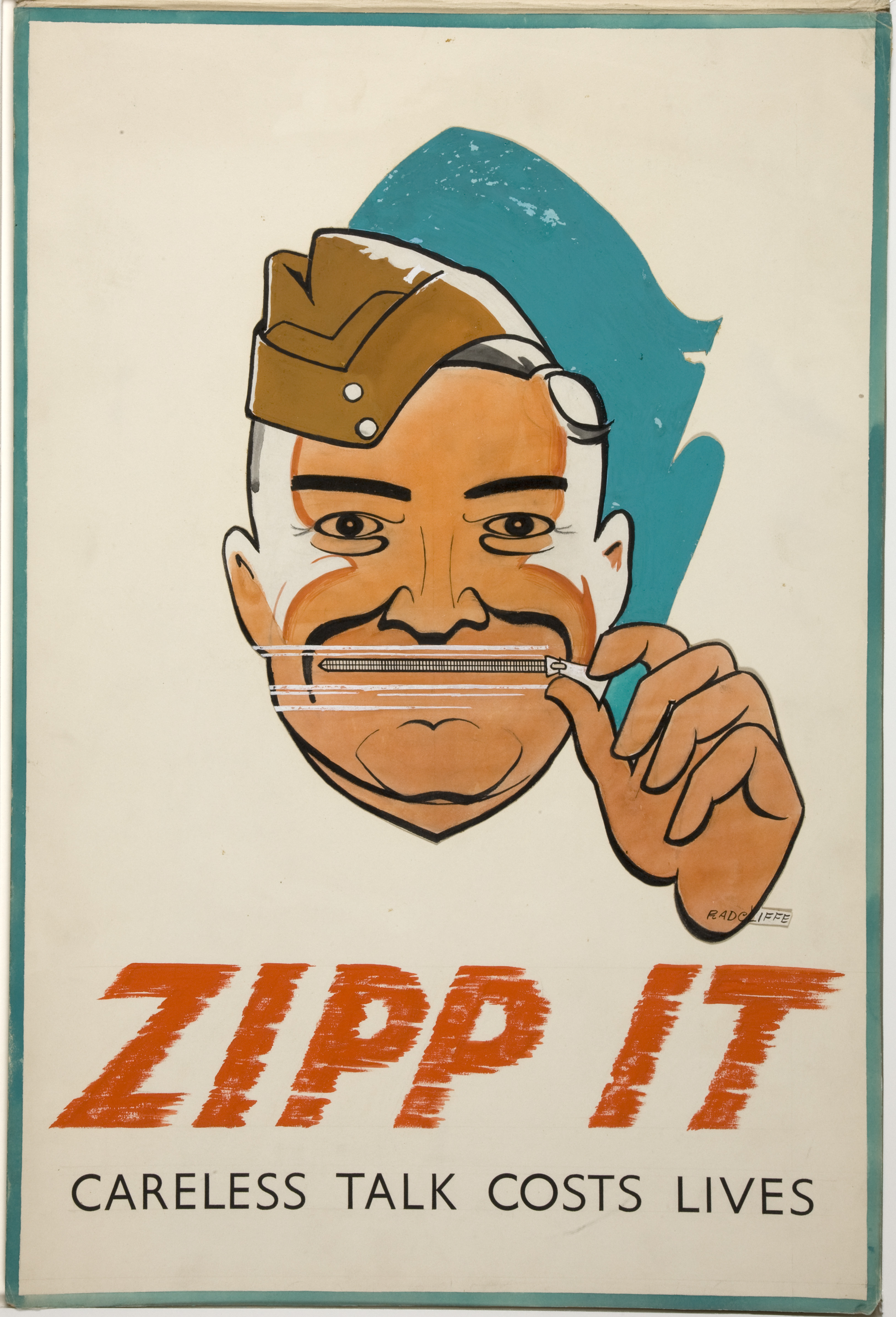

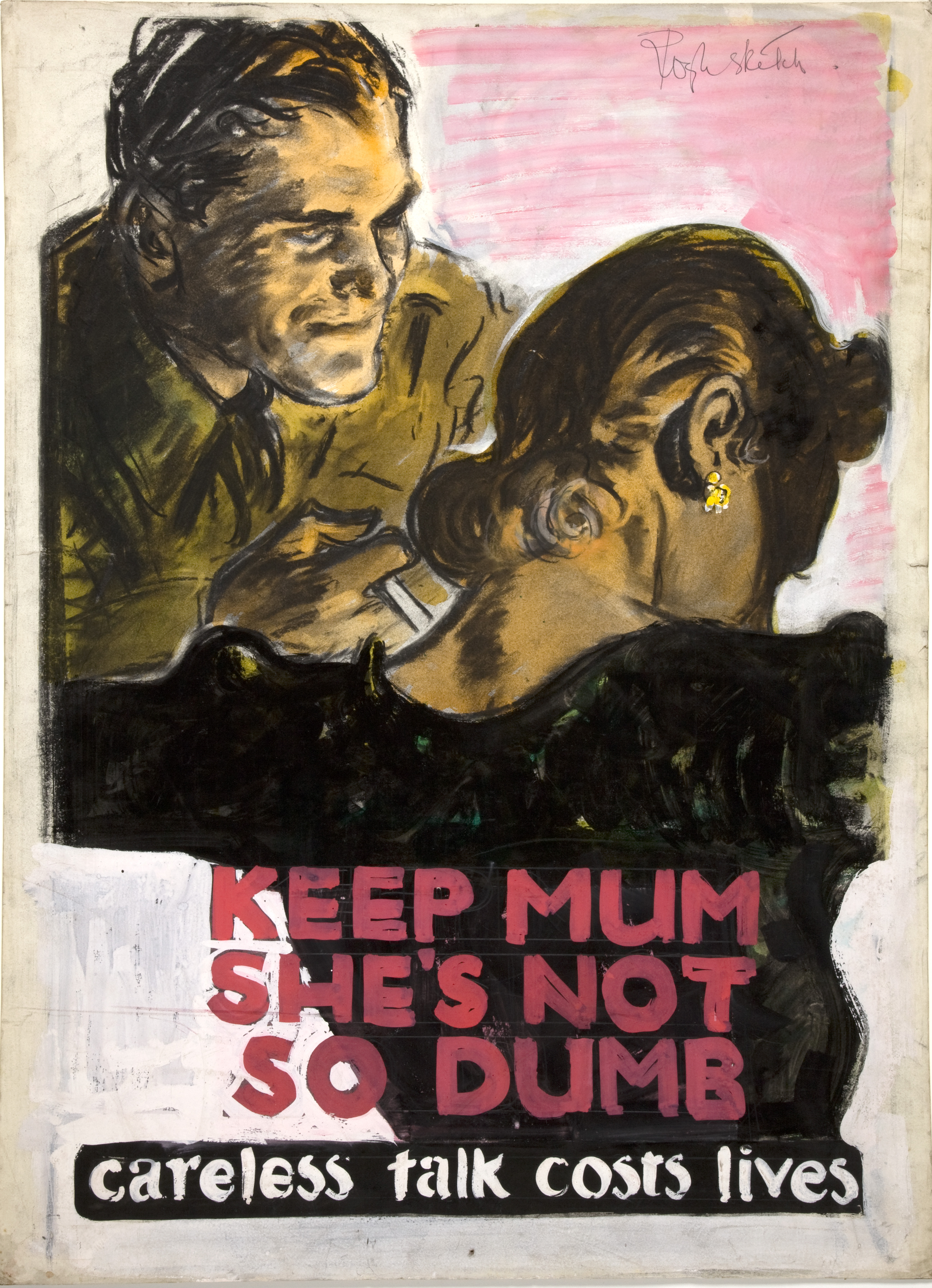

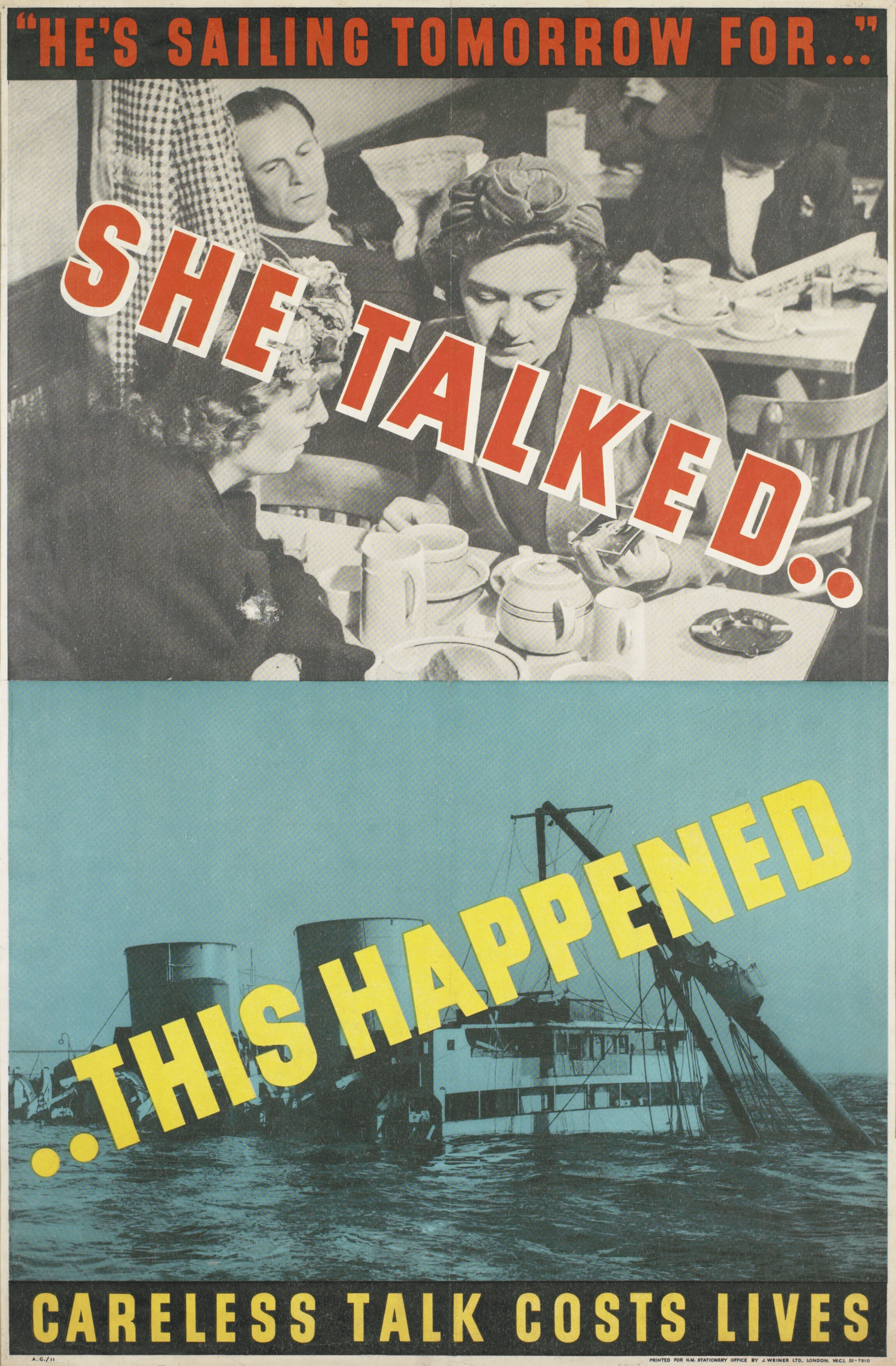

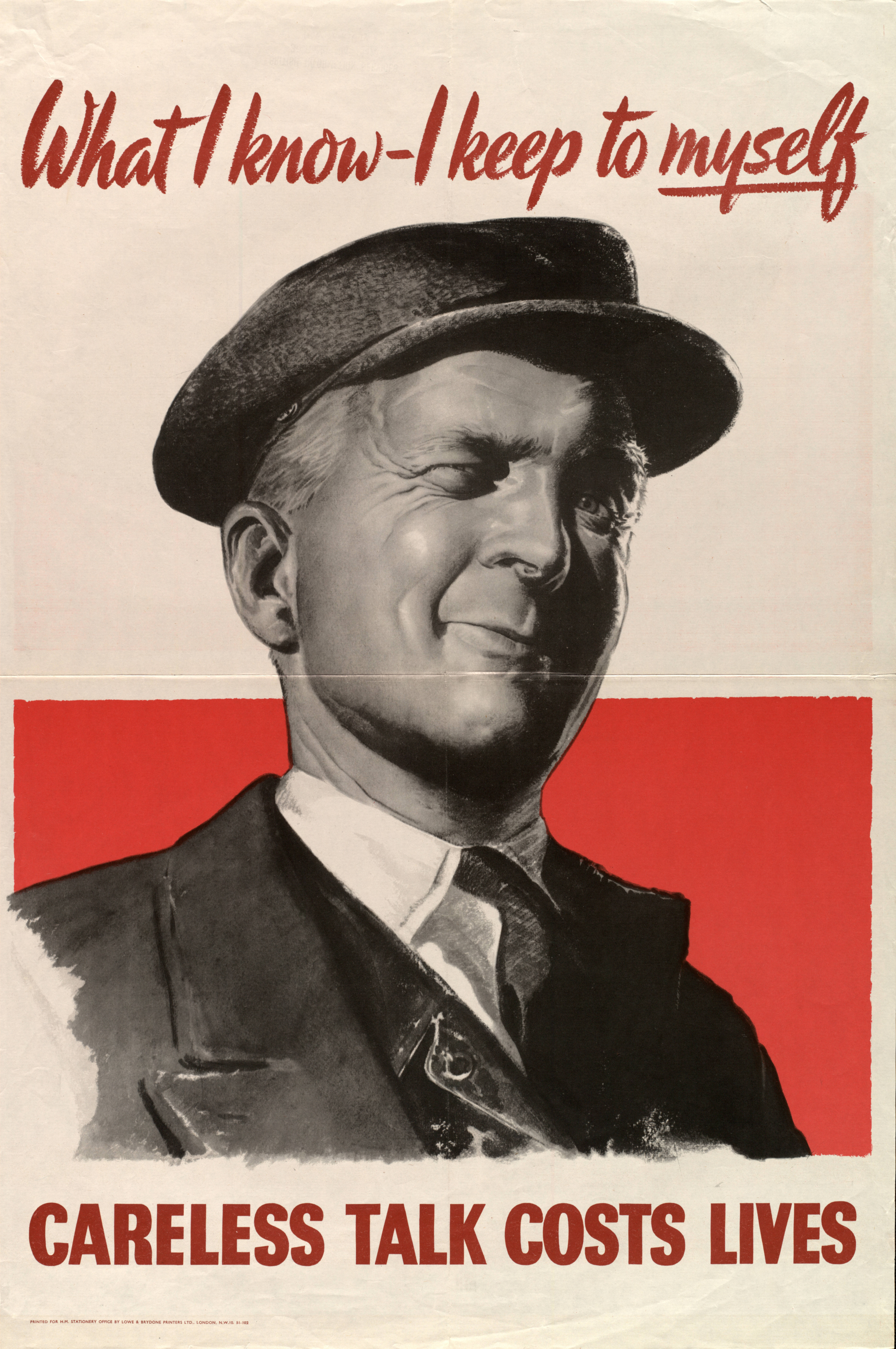

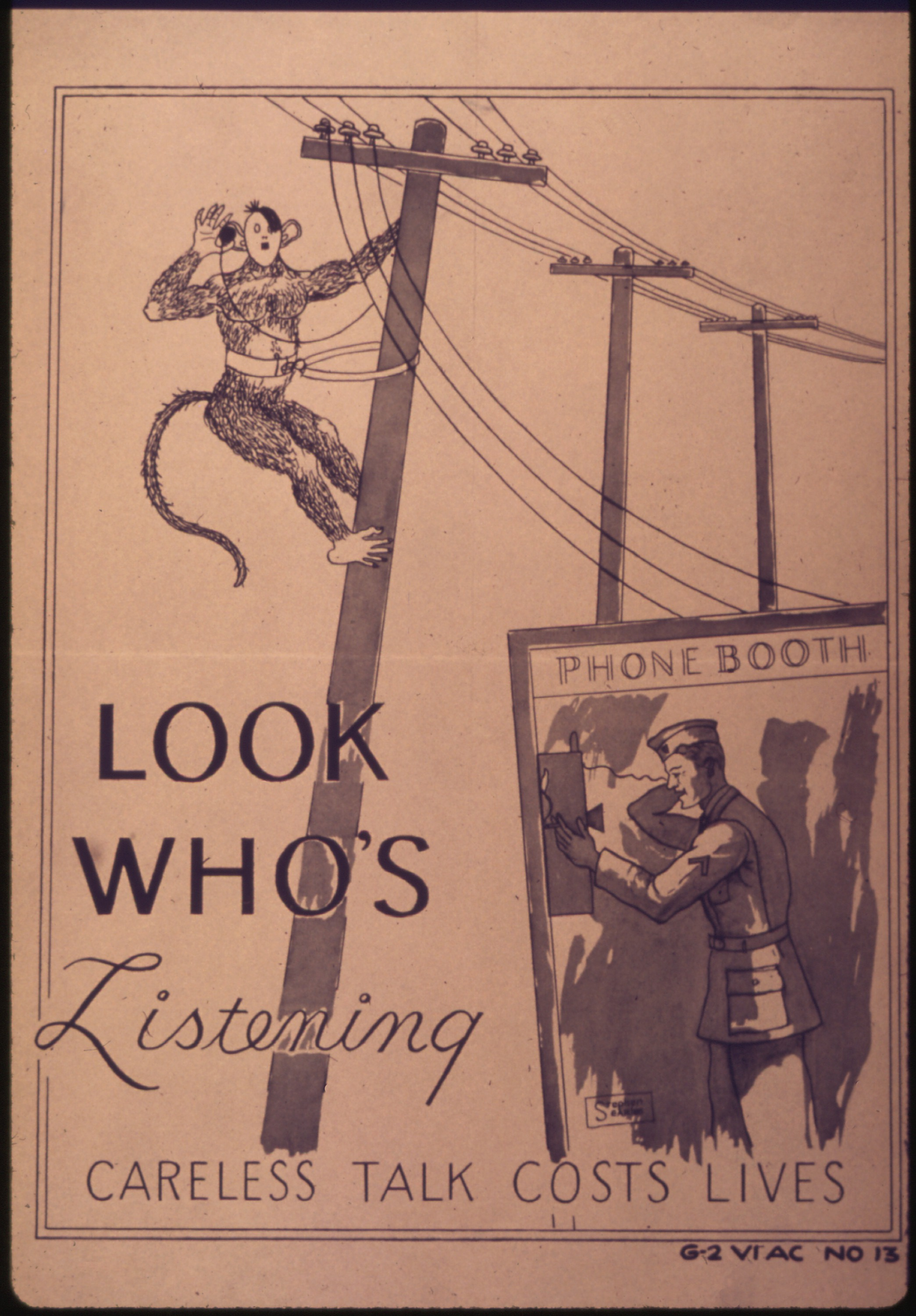

== See also ==
- Propaganda in World War II
- Loose lips sink ships
- En svensk tiger
