= Ann Heberlein =

Swedish author, ethicist and theologian

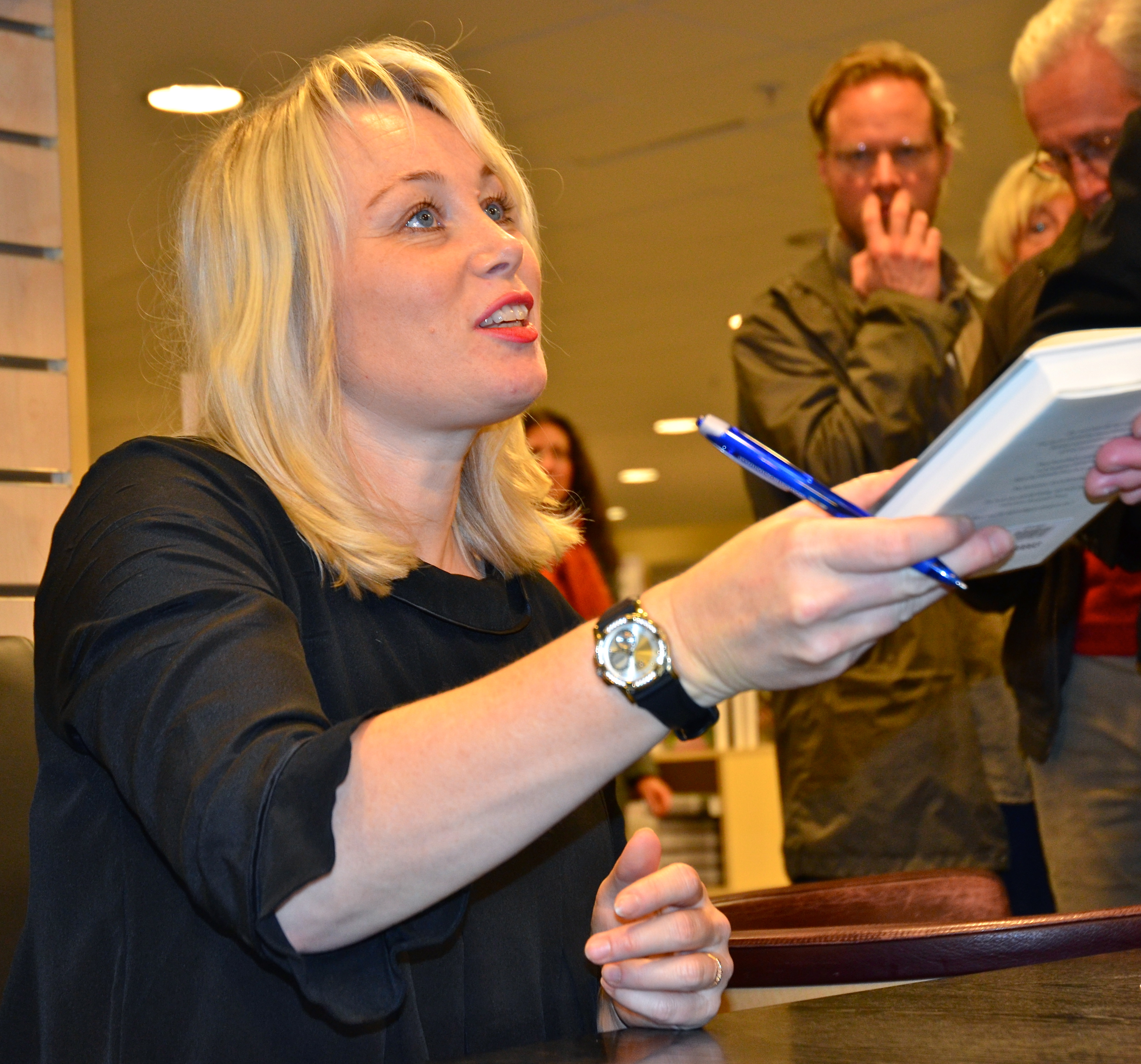
- Heberlein signing a book at a bookstore in Stockholm in November 2011
- Born: Ann Helen Holmström; 22 June 1970 (age 56); Malmö, Sweden
- Education: Lund University
- Occupation: Writer
- Writing career
- Period: 2004–present

Ann Helen Heberlein (née Holmström; born 22 June 1970) is a Swedish academic and author, who writes extensively on theology and ethics. She is best known for her autobiographical account of life with bipolar disorder, Jag vill inte dö, jag vill bara inte leva (2008; "I don't want to die, I just don't want to live").

She ran for parliament in the 2018 general election as a Moderate Party representative.

== Career ==
Heberlein defended her dissertation Kränkningar och förlåtelse (Abuses and forgiveness) at Lund University in 2005. The thesis was about guilt, shame, moral responsibility, abuses and forgiveness for the dissertation.

In January 2007, she began teaching practical philosophy at Stockholm University, while working on a project about the criminal justice system. Since 2009, Heberlein has worked at Lund University.

She wrote Den sexuella människan in 2004, and contributed to Systematisk teologi (Martinsson, Sigurdson & Svenungsson, 2007). In 2008, Heberlein published the book Det var inte mitt fel! Om konsten att ta ansvar.

Heberlein is also an author and columnist for the newspapers Sydsvenskan and Dagens Nyheter, and has also previously written columns for Expressen and Axess. She also has a column in the Christian paper Kyrkans tidning. She is also a regular at Sveriges Radio's P1 with her own radio show Tankar för dagen. In the summer of 2009, Heberlein was one of the celebrity speakers at the P1 radio show Sommarpratarna.

In 2008, Heberlein published Jag vill inte dö, jag vill bara inte leva, an autobiographical book about her life with suicidal thoughts and severe anxiety and bipolar disorder, which brought her nationwide attention. In 2012, her book became a play at the Royal Dramatic Theatre in Stockholm.

On 24 May 2016, Heberlein resigned from Sydsvenskan after claiming that culture editor Rakel Chukri had forbidden her from writing critically about immigration or Islam on her private Facebook page. Chukri denied having made such a request in an interview.

On 26 January 2018, Kickstarter banned Heberlein's crowdfunding for the book "Rape and Culture – A survey of group violence in Sweden 2012–2017" which became news in mainstream-media in Sweden. On 30 January 2018, Heberlein reports she has managed to attract a bit over 1 M SEK through crowdfunding from approximate 5000 backers through other channels.

== Bibliography ==
- Arendt: om kärlek och ondska: biografi. Mondial bokförlag (2020).
- Den banala godheten. Greycat Publishing (2017)
- Gud, om vi ska talas vid du och jag måste jag vara helt ärlig. Bonnier (2015)
- Etik : människa, moral, mening : en introduktion. Bonnier (2014)
- Ett gott liv. Albert Bonniers förlag (2011)
- En liten bok om ondska. Albert Bonniers förlag (2010)
- Jag vill inte dö, jag vill bara inte leva. Weyler förlag (2008)
- Det var inte mitt fel! Om konsten att ta ansvar. ICA bokförlag (2008)
- Kränkningar och förlåtelse. Thales förlag (2005)
- Den sexuella människan. Etiska perspektiv. Lund (2004)
