= The Supersizers... =

- Title card for "The Supersizers Eat", the additional word (e.g. The Eighties) is added for each individual episode.
- Also known as: The Supersizers Go... The Supersizers Eat...
- Starring: Giles Coren, Sue Perkins, Cooks: Sophie Grigson; Allegra McEvedy; Mark Hix; Rosemary Shrager; Mickael Weiss
- Narrated by: Roy Marsden
- Country of origin: United Kingdom
- No. of series: 2
- No. of episodes: 12

Production
- Producer: Silver River Productions
- Running time: 60 minutes

Original release
- Network: BBC Two
- Release: 20 May 2008 – 27 July 2009

The Supersizers Go... and The Supersizers Eat... are two BBC television series about the history of food, mainly in Britain. Both series are presented by journalist and restaurant critic Giles Coren and broadcaster and comedian Sue Perkins.

The series originated in a one-off edition in April 2007 as part of a season of programmes on the Edwardian period, "Edwardian Supersize Me", a reference to the film Super Size Me by Morgan Spurlock. This programme set the format for the subsequent television series in that Coren and Perkins adopted the persona of a couple living in the Edwardian period and for a week ate the food which people from that period would have eaten. In addition they would take part in the interests and activities of them too, even going so far as adopting the dress and mannerisms of the time, with plenty of sarcastic humour. Before and after the experience they were subject to medical tests to see how the diet affected them.

As of 2 August 2010 the series was being broadcast on the UKTV channel Good Food. The episodes shown on Good Food were cut to 47-minute versions of the original, to accommodate commercial breaks. The series also broadcasts on Yesterday and Watch.

In 2011 a one-off royal wedding-themed special was broadcast in the same week as Prince William's marriage to Catherine Middleton.

As of January 2012 the show was in the United States on The Cooking Channel, shown with commercial interruptions. It was also on the Food Network in Canada.

== Episodes ==
The one-off programme "Edwardian Supersize Me" was produced as part of the season "The Edwardians – the Birth of Now" on BBC Four.

Title	Description	Original air date
Edwardian Supersize Me	Diet of the Edwardian period (1901–1910), with five meals a day, heavy in meat and pudding, which, on one day, sum up to 5,000 calories. With chef Sophie Grigson.	16 April 2007

=== The Supersizers Go... ===
Sue Perkins and Giles Coren dressed in Victorian garb.

A series of six episodes was commissioned by the BBC under the title The Supersizers Go... which was broadcast from May 2008 and covered different periods.

Title	Description	Original air date
The Supersizers Go...Wartime	Exploring the diet during World War II when food was subject to rationing. With chef Allegra McEvedy.	20 May 2008
The Supersizers Go...Restoration	Exploring the diet of the Restoration period in the 17th century. Aided by chef Allegra McEvedy . Hosted at Ham House.	27 May 2008
The Supersizers Go...Victorian	Diet of the Victorian era in the late 19th century. Aided by chef Sophie Grigson.	3 June 2008
The Supersizers Go...Seventies	Diet of Britons living in the 1970s. Aided by chef Mark Hix.	10 June 2008
The Supersizers Go...Elizabethan	Diet of the Elizabethan era (1558–1603). Cooked by Paul Merrett, hosted at Sutton House.	17 June 2008
The Supersizers Go...Regency	Diet of the Britons in the Regency period of 1789–1821. With chef Rosemary Shrager.	24 June 2008

=== The Supersizers Eat... ===
Sue Perkins and Giles Coren dressed in stereotypical '80s fashion.

The Supersizers Eat sees Coren and Perkins sample the culinary delights of 1950s Britain, Medieval England, 1980s London and the Roaring Twenties. Marie-Antoinette's Versailles and Ancient Rome also feature, making this the first time that an entire episode was devoted to historical foreign cuisine.

Coren has said that he and Perkins are reluctant to make a third series ("Sue and I can't just keep sitting at tables, pulling faces and making smart remarks about the food") but that the duo are likely to do further work with each other on the BBC.

Title	Description	Original air date
The Supersizers Eat...The Eighties	In the first episode, Giles and Sue investigate the diet of the country in the 1980s. During the show they try Nouvelle cuisine, Microwave meals, Viennetta, Champagne and Pop-Tarts, along with other typical 80s meals. Guest diners include Jeffrey Archer and Ken Livingstone.	15 June 2009
The Supersizers Eat...Medieval	Coren and Perkins take the role of a Lord and Lady of the Manor in medieval England. Aided by chef Martin Blunos, hosted at Penshurst Place. Coren thought this period's feast offered the best food of this series, a cockentrice, an imaginary bird made from the front end of a turkey and the back of a piglet, and the worst, very dry peacock meat. They were joined by guest diner Michael Portillo.	22 June 2009
The Supersizers Eat...The French Revolution	The Supersizers experience the lives of Marie-Antoinette and King Louis XVI, devour a 5,000-calorie breakfast feast, try the exotic new vegetable craze, the potato, and also observe the advent of the restaurant. They were aided by French chef Mickael Weiss	6 July 2009
The Supersizers Eat...The Roaring Twenties	Giles enjoys a breakfast of boiled eggs, toast and potted shrimp, whilst Sue makes do with vitamin pills and laxatives as the fad of dieting begins. They then drink cocktails at The Ritz.	13 July 2009
The Supersizers Eat...The Fifties	Eating subject to rationing, celebrating the Coronation of Queen Elizabeth II, American youth culture and a roadside picnic. Guests include Marguerite Patten.	20 July 2009
The Supersizers Eat...Ancient Rome	Senator Giles Coren and vestal virgin Sue Perkins travel back to 44BC–80AD for a journey through the early days of Ancient Rome	27 July 2009

=== Special ===
Title	Description	Original air date
Giles and Sue's Royal Wedding	Giles and Sue assume the roles of a modern prince and his princess-to-be as they agonise over every step of the wedding planning process, culminating in a seven-course breakfast prepared by Mickael Weiss, head chef at Coq d'Argent.	27 April 2011

== Foreign versions ==
So far, the only foreign version of Supersizers is the widely popular Swedish TV show Historieätarna ("The History Eaters"), shown on SVT. Unlike the British show, the show had a third season, following Lotta Lundgren and Erik Haag as they live and eat in Swedish time periods from the 16th century to the 21st. The show also generated a 24-episode Christmas special (or Advent calendar) for children in 2015 called Tusen år till julafton (sv) ("A thousand years to Christmas Eve"). Due to legal conflict with Fremantle media and later Sony about who owns the legal rights to the series, the Christmas special will not be aired again.
