= Hotell Gyllene knorren =

2010 Swedish television series

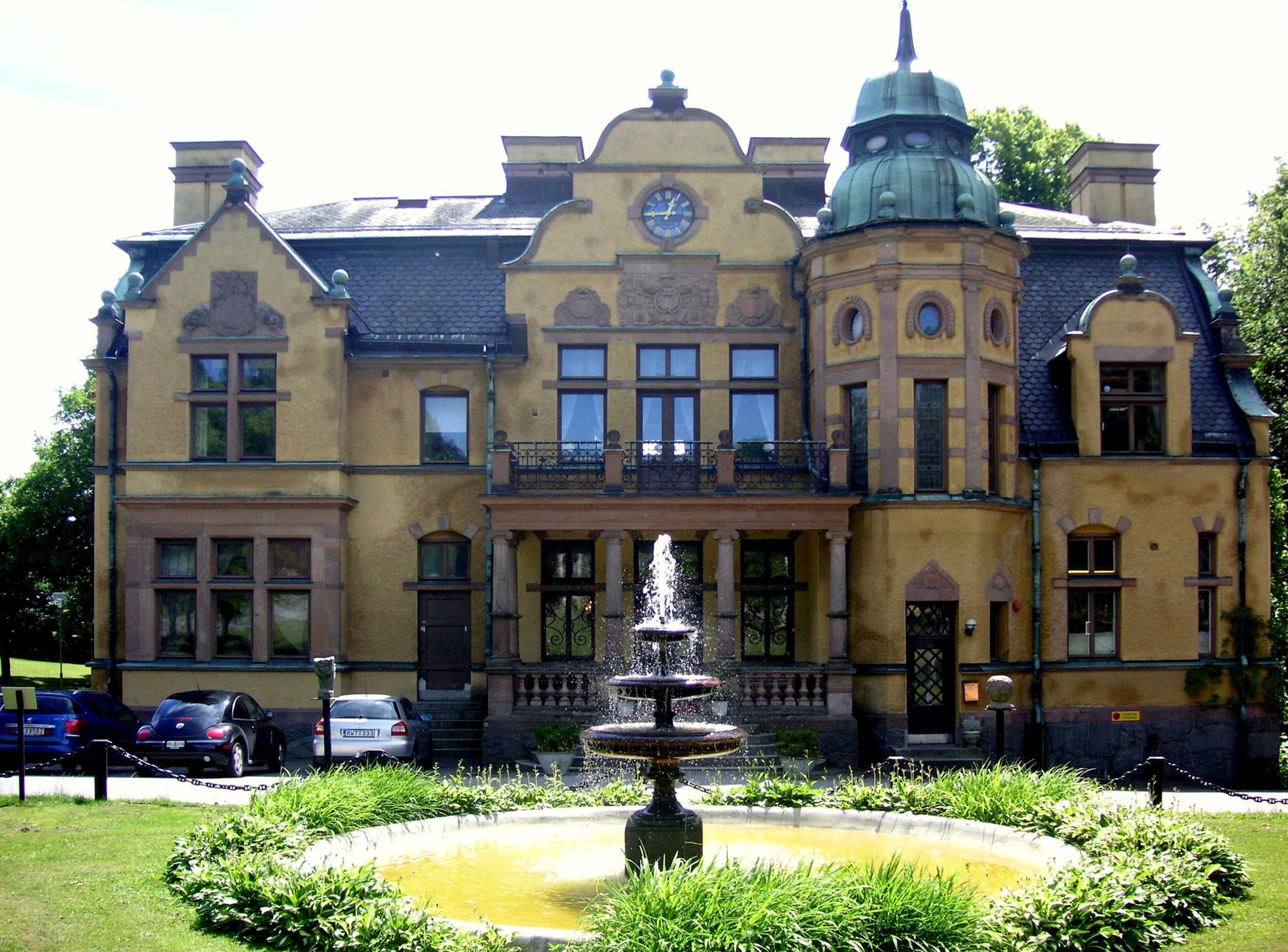
- The series was recorded at the Ljunglöf Castle in Bromma
- Genre: children
- Starring: Maria Sid; Peter Engman
- Narrated by: Fillie Lyckow
- Composer: sv:Niklas Fransson
- Countries of origin: Sweden; Finland
- Original language: Swedish
- No. of seasons: 1
- No. of episodes: 24

Production
- Executive producer: Börje Hansson
- Producer: Johanna Bergenstråhle
- Production company: Svensk Filmindustri

Original release
- Network: SVT 1 SVT B SVT HD
- Release: 1 December – 24 December 2010

Related
- Superhjältejul (2009); Tjuvarnas jul (2011)

Hotell Gyllene knorren ("Hotel Golden Pigtail") was the Sveriges Television's Christmas calendar in 2010.

== Plot ==
The Rantanen family leaves town for the countryside, where they purchase a hotel from the Grossman family, named "Hotell Gyllene Orren" (Hotel Golden Black Grouse). The family consists of; dad Roger Rantanen, who used to work as a vacuum cleaner salesman; mum Ritva Rantanen from Finland, who used to work on a ferry; sister Isadora Rantanen, 14 years old and in love with the hotel competitor family's son; and Ingo Rantanen, is a big friend of animals and finds out there is a pig on the hotel, named Pyret.

The Rantanens are struggling to keep the hotel running as a new more modern hotel, opened by the Grossman family, has started up nearby the highway. Many guests checked out after Ingo, one of the family members, accidentley told there was a pig on the hotel. A journalist arrived at the hotel and checked in, and was shortly after checked out after finding out there's barely no food, very old style and about the pig. She therefore stopped by the hotel sign on the alley leading to the hotel, adding "KN" before "orren", which turns out as "knorren" ("pigtail"). Many other planned guests therefore decided not to check in at the hotel. The Rantanens try their best to receive guests.

== Cast ==
- Maria Sid – Ritva Rantanen; mother of the Rantanen family
- Peter Engman – Roger Rantanen; father of the Rantanen family
- Linnea Firsching – Isadora Rantanen; daughter of the Rantanen family
- Buster Isitt – Ingo Rantanen; son of the Rantanen family
- Axel Karlsson – Tony Grossman; son of the Grossman family
- Simon Norrthon – Henning Grossman; father of the Grossman family
- Karin Bergquist – Amelia Grossman; mother of the Grossman family
- Vanna Rosenberg – reporter Wallraff; the journalist who scribbled on the hotel sign
- Annika Augustsson – editor in chief Charlotta
- Jane Friedmann – Laila
- Jesper Bromark – Ritva's chief
- Stefan Klockby – Rasmus van Damme
- Johan Rheborg – Lennart; vacuum cleaner competitor seller and friend of Roger Rantanen
- Johannes Wanselow – neighbour and farmer Jönsson; the owner of the pig Pyret
- Carla Abrahamsen – Angelika Grossman; cousin to Tony Grossman
- Shima Niavarani – Yvonne
- Kajsa Ernst – Inga-Kajsa
- Sunil Munshi – Kennert
- Kåre Möder – carbon man
- Filippa Höglund – Hanna
- Ameria Yakan – Carro
- Olof Wretling – Rolf
- Sven Björklund – Rudolf
- Per Svensson – Jesper Jeppson; father of the Jeppson family, guests at the hotel
- Ann-Charlotte Franzén – Jenny Jeppson; mother of the Jeppson family, guests at the hotel
- Linda Camarena – Janina Jeppson; daughter of the Jeppson family, guests at the hotel
- Violetta Stephan-Barsotti – Annika Bonusson
- Josef Törner – parking inspector
- Michael Bergqvist och Sandra Camenisch – lovers
- Lotta Tejle – councillor Marianne
- David Wiberg – assistant Razak

== Video ==
The series was released to VHS and DVD on 26 January 2011.
