= Tjuvarnas jul =

2011 Swedish television program

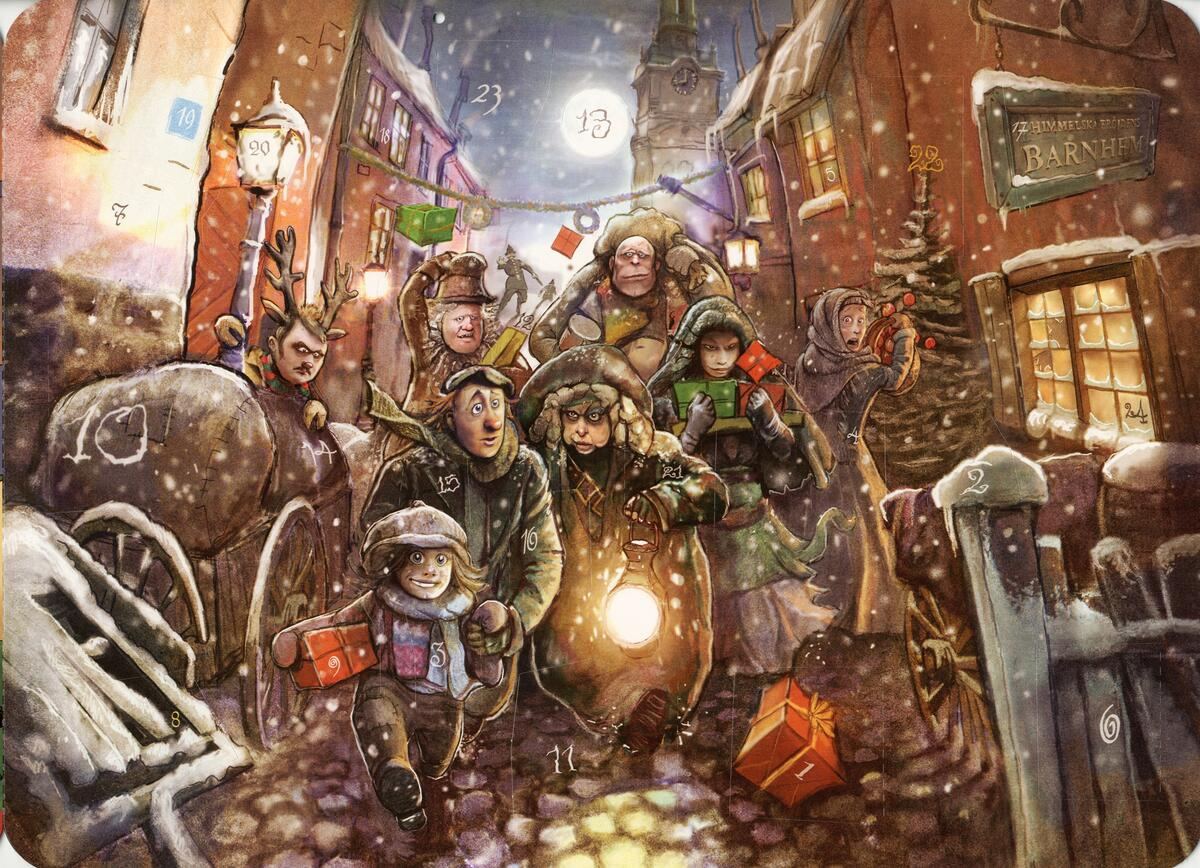
- Thieves' Christmas paper calendar from 2011 depicting the characters from the series
- Genre: children
- Created by: Stefan Roos; Per Simonsson
- Developed by: Stefan Roos, Per Simonsson
- Written by: Stefan Roos, Per Simonsson
- Directed by: Stefan Roos, Per Simonsson
- Starring: Tea Stjärne; Gustaf Hammarsten; Elisabet Carlsson; Claes Månsson
- Narrated by: Stefan Roos
- Composers: Håkan Eriksson; Jonatan Järpehag; Magnus Ringblom
- Country of origin: Sweden
- Original language: Swedish
- No. of seasons: 1
- No. of episodes: 24

Production
- Production company: SVT

Original release
- Network: SVT1; SVT B SVT HD
- Release: 1 December – 24 December 2011

Related
- Hotell Gyllene knorren (2010); Mysteriet på Greveholm: Grevens återkomst (2012)

Tjuvarnas jul (The Thieves' Christmas) was a 2011 TV series for children that was the SVT Christmas calendar broadcast from 1–24 December by Sveriges Television. The plot focuses on a thief named Kurre and his little daughter Charlie. It has a style reminiscent of Charles Dickens's stories.

== Plot ==
The series is set in Stockholm during the 19th century. Kurre makes a living entirely by stealing. He is involved in a gang of thieves led by the evil old woman Madame Bofvén. He lives alone in a loft until a little girl named Ing-Britt, later renamed Charlie by Madame Bofvén, appears outside his door. During the series, Kurre and Ing-Britt gradually come to know each other as father and daughter, while Madame Bofvén plans to rob the large department store and the police diligently pursue the thieves. As if that were not enough, the store owner seems to be hiding a secret of his own.

== Cast ==
- Stefan Roos – Narrator
- Tea Stjärne – Charlie
- Gustaf Hammarsten – Kurre
- Elisabet Carlsson – Gerda
- Jonas Hellman-Driessen – Lönnroth
- Maria Kim – Skuggan
- Thomas Hedengran – Jönsson
- Göran Forsmark – Jansson
- Carl Carlswärd – Trollet
- Siw Carlsson – Madame Bofvén
- Bert Gradin – Bongo
- Anne Kulle – Direktörskan
- Emilie Nyman – Agnes
- Peter Eriksson – Rupert
- Claes Månsson – Föreståndaren
- Birgitta Sundberg – Barnavårdstant
- Urban Frånberg – Personalchef
- Bertil Norström – Polismästaren
- Madeleine Silfving – Flickan
- Bengt Krantz – Borgmästaren

== Sequel ==
A freestanding feature-length film is in production to premiere in late 2014.
