= Selmas saga =

- Genre: children, steampunk
- Written by: Per Simonsson; Stefan Roos
- Directed by: Per Simonsson; Stefan Roos
- Starring: Johan Ulveson, Ester Vuori, Leo Hellenius
- Composer: Jonatan Järpehag
- Country of origin: Sweden
- Original language: Swedish
- No. of seasons: 1
- No. of episodes: 24

Production
- Producer: Helena Larsson
- Production company: Nordisk Film TV

Original release
- Network: SVT1; Barnkanalen
- Release: 1 December – 24 December 2016

Related
- Tusen år till julafton (2015); Jakten på tidskristallen (2017)

Selmas saga was the Sveriges Television's Christmas calendar for 2016.

The knitted tuque worn by Selma Traskvist, the main character, in the series led to a temporary knitting boom.

The series was later sold to France, the Netherlands, Russia, the Czech Republic and Slovakia.

== Plot ==
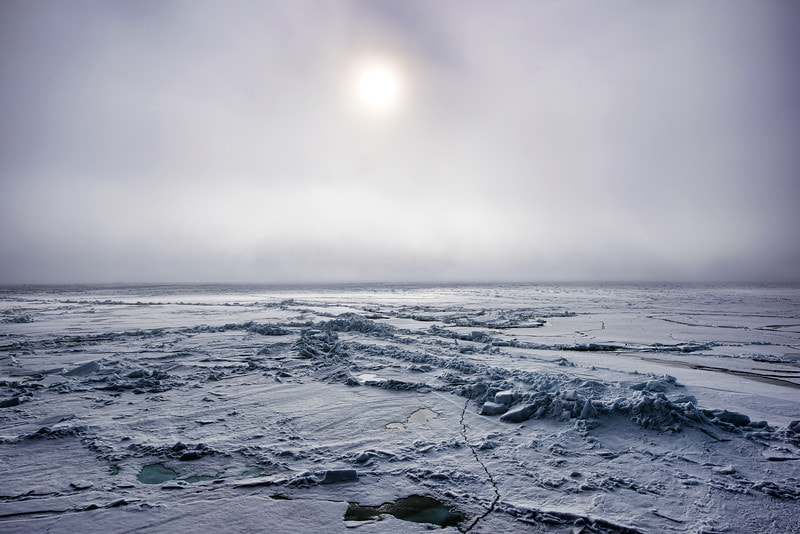
The Arctic, where Santa Claus is supposed to live in the story.

The series is inspirerd by steampunk and set a fictional era, inspired by the early 20th century

It follows Selma Traskvist, an 8 years old young girl who goes out on an adventure in the airship "Valborg" from Sweden to the Arctic along with quirky professor Efraim von Trippelhatt trying to find Santa Claus.

== Roles ==
- Ester Vuori - Selma
- Johan Ulveson - Efraim von Trippelhatt
- Sofia Bach - Nordenstierne
- Pierre Tafvelin - Fabrikören Theodor Julius Hermelin
- Mikael Riesebeck - Pappa Traskvist
- Lotta Östlin - Mamma Traskvist
- Björn Gustafson - Morfar Otto
- Vilda Carleblank - Selmas lillasyster Signe
- Leo Hellenius - Rupert
- Viktor Friberg - Antikhandlare
- Stefan Roos - Kettil Felterus
- Shima Niavarani - Tomtevettingen
- Marienette Dahlin - Husvärdinnan
- Lisette Pagler - Journalisten
- Ing-Marie Carlsson - Valborg (Countess of Gruus)
- Nicke Wagemyr - Greven
- Meg Westergren - Alamandha
- Nils Eklund - Grimundius
- Carl Carlswärd - Herr Stubbgrå
