= Rolf Degerlund =

Swedish actor

Rolf Harry Degerlund (born 8 December 1952 in Gunnarsbyn) is a Swedish actor. Rolf is married to Kerstin Degerlund, Graphic designer. Rolf is the Theatre Director for the Sami National Theatre in Norway since 2016. He has been married to Lotta Gröning.

After studying at Kalix folkhögskola, Degerlund studied at Marcel Marceau's theatre school in Ireland and at Josef Szajna's studio theatre in Warsaw. In 1975 Degerlund worked for the TV theatre in Gothenburg and 1978 for TV in Sundsvall. In 1978 he was engaged as actor at Norrbottensteatern where he was theatre chief 1988–2001.

In 2002 Degerlund founded the Ice Globe Theatre in Jukkasjärvi, a theatre which is a copy of Shakespeare's Globe, except that it's built of ice and snow, and in 2004 he received the Innovation Award in London for his "innovative" theatre.

== Selected filmography ==
- 2009 - Luftslottet som sprängdes
- 2008 - Varg
- 2003 - Emma och Daniel: Mötet
- 2002 - Grabben i graven bredvid
- 1997 - Vildängel
- 1997 - Kalle Blomkvist och Rasmus
- 1996 - Jägarna
- 1991 - Barnens Detektivbyrå (TV)
- 1989 - Tre kärlekar (TV)
