= Supersnällasilversara och Stålhenrik =

- Genre: superhero television
- Country of origin: Sweden
- Original language: Swedish

Original release
- Network: SVT1
- Release: 21 January 2005 – 2005

Supersnällasilversara och Stålhenrik (Super-nice Silver-Sara and Steel-Henrik) is a Swedish children's television series. Two of the screenwriters are Sara Edwardsson and Pasqual Wahlin. Among the actors who have participated in this TV-series are Rolf Skoglund, Basia Frydman, Anita Blom, Åsa Karlin, Peter Engman and Lena Strömdahl. Children have also participated, including some from Örskolan.

== Plot ==
Two superheroes, called Supersnällasilversara (Sara Edwardsson) and Stålhenrik (Henrik Ståhl) live on the Moon. Supersnällasilversara lives with many collected things and Stålhenrik with his dumbbells etc., which he uses to become stronger. When the mission alarm sounds, children on the Earth are in trouble and need their help. But if someone calls Supersnällasilversara "stupid", she'll be angry and transformed to Supersurasunksara (Super-angry Sloppy-Sara). When the mission is finished and they get back home to the Moon, Stålhenrik will try to force Supersurasunksara into a booth, where she is transformed back to Supersnällasilversara (except in one episode, where Supersurasunksara is transformed to Superstyggapunksara—Super-nasty Punky-Sara—because the booth malfunctions; however, one more transformation takes her back to Supersnällasilversara).

== The Christmas Calendar (Julkalendern) ==
Superhjältejul, which follows Supersnällasilversara and Stålhenrik, was recorded during the spring of 2009, then broadcast December 1–24.
