= Superhjältejul =

- Genre: children, superhero
- Starring: Sara Edwardsson; Henrik Ståhl; Eva Rydberg
- Composers: Robert Gehring; Peter Ågren
- Country of origin: Sweden
- Original language: Swedish
- No. of seasons: 1
- No. of episodes: 24

Production
- Production company: SVT

Original release
- Network: SVT 1 SVT B SVT HD
- Release: 1 December – 24 December 2009

Related
- Skägget i brevlådan (2008); Hotell Gyllene knorren (2010)

Superhjältejul (Superhero Christmas) is the 2009 Sveriges Television's Christmas calendar in Sveriges Television (broadcast in the channel SVT1), directed by Carl Englén, and the manuscript is written by Jan Vierth, Anders Sparring and Pasqual Vallin Johansson. This television series is the follow-up of Supersnällasilversara och Stålhenrik and was recorded during spring 2009. Since 2010 it is able to buy it on DVD.

== Characters ==
=== Supersnällasilversara/Supersurasunksara ===
Supersnällasilversara (Super-nice Silver-Sara) is a very kind superhero and loves collecting things, helping children and missions. She thinks the pensioner life on Julstjärnan is boring. She loves making food and baking. If someone calls her "dum" (in English: "stupid/bad"), she'll be angry and transformed to the angry and sloppy superhero Supersurasunksara (Super-angry Sloppy-Sara). Supersnällasilversara and Supersurasunksara are played by Sara Edwardsson.

=== Stålhenrik ===
Stålhenrik (Steel-Henrik) is a superhero who is strong and unable to beat, because he is hard as steel, but he's a little bit afraid. He loves Supersnällasilversara. He likes the pensioner life on Julstjärnan. He likes telling about the adventures from his and Supersnällasilversara's years as young in Hjältedådsboken (the Book of Heroism) for their granddaughters Vega and Nova. Stålhenrik is played by Henrik Ståhl.

=== Stuntstina ===
Stuntstina is a superhero who must help the Universe and in the 1st program she leaves her daughters Vega and Nova at her parents' (Supersnällasilversara and Stålhenrik) home on Julstjärnan and in the 24th and last program she picks them up again. Stuntstina is played by Sara Edwardsson.

=== Vega and Nova ===
Vega (Kajsa Halldén) and Nova (Mathilda Thofte) are granddaughters to Supersnällasilversara and Stålhenrik and daughters to Stuntstina. They like playing and adventures and are very bravery. Vega's super-power is trying to fly and Nova's super-power is trying to move things with "thinking-power" with the brain.

=== Gjerta ===
Gjerta is a super-villain who occupies the child-organization Barnverket and wants to stop the children's laughing and fixes a gang with villains who can help her. Gjerta is played by Eva Rydberg.

=== Flemming Flink ===
Flemming Flink is Gjerta's sister son and is always kind. Gjerta wants to make him bad but fails with that. Flemming is played by Esben Pretzmann.

=== Ture Tvestjärt ===
Ture Tvestjärt is a villain in Gjerta's gang who is afraid of dirt, bacillus etc. and always uses a spray. He hates pets. He is played by Shebly Niavarani.

=== Anna Flabet ===
Anna Flabet is a villain in Gjerta's gang and wants to destroy books and reading because she herself can't read. She is played by Malin Cederbladh.

=== Klante Volante ===
Klante Volante is a villain in Gjerta's gang. Earlier he was a tightrope walker but he was always falls down because he is so clumsy (Swedish: klantig) and then people laugh to him. He hates laughing and wants to destroy it. Klante is played by Per Burell.

=== Tinnitus Triplets ===
The Tinnitus Triplets (Swedish: Trillingarna Tinnitus), Tina (Inga Onn), Nina (Frida Röhl) and Tuss (Anna Blomberg), are 3 villains in Gjerta's gang. They hate music etc. and want to stop it.

=== Frigolit Fragile ===
Frigolit Fragile is a villain in Gjerta's gang. He has a house of cards-museum where children who like running destroy the houses of cards. Frigolit doesn't want them to run and wants to wake them up in midnight. He's played by Bernard Cauchard.

=== Uni Sax ===
Uni Sax is a villain in Gjerta's gang. She wants all people to do and appeare the same. She always wears her finger doll Uno on her finger. She's played by Katrin Sundberg.

=== Järn-Jerry ===
Järn-Jerry (Iron-Jerry) is Supersnällasilversara & Stålhenrik's neighbour on Julstjärnan. He is brawling very much with Stålhenrik because he think he's the best. Järn-Jerry's played by Björn Gedda.

=== Olga Hott ===
Olga Hott (real name Helga Het) is a strange woman on Julstjärnan. She works at Hemliga högtidsenheten (The Secret Unit). She's played by Iwa Boman.

=== Hustomten ===
Hustomten (the House Santa) is the Father Christmas of Julstjärnan, but in the end, Hustomten is betrayed as Gjerta who has been on Julstjärnan, dressed up as Hustomten. Hustomten is played by Pierre Lindstedt.

== Citations ==
(Stålhenrik) "Såja, Supersnällasilversara! Snäll och fin, snäll och fin!" ("All right, Super-nice-silver-Sara! Be kind and nice, be kind and nice!") (Supersnällasilversara) "Jag orkar inte vara snäll och fin hela ti'n!" ("I can't be kind and nice every time!")

== Plot ==
=== Part 1 ===
The superheroes Supersnällasilversara and Stålhenrik are now pensioners and live on the planet Julstjärnan (the Christmas Star), where it is Christmas every day. One day their daughter Stuntstina comes to Julstjärnan and asks them to take care of her daughters Vega and Nova because she herself must help the Universe. Stålhenrik and Supersnällasilversara start to read about their adventures as young in Hjältedådsboken (the Book of Heroism):

Stålhenrik's parents left him alone on the Moon when he was big as an adult and his mission is to fly to the Earth and help children in case of emergency but he can't fly! Then he sits and reads his book and doesn't care his emergency alarm. Suddenly Supersurasunksara, who is flying, lands on him and wants to smash on something, and Stålhenrik allows her to smash on his steel body, and after that Supersurasunksara becomes transformed to Supersnällasilversara and since this day they love each other.

And Stålhenrik also tells about how the adventure started:

An organization, called Barnverket, who worked for making everything good for children, changed chief and the new chief was Superskurken Gjerta (Gjerta, the super-villain) who had dressed up herself as a woman called Gudrun.

=== Part 2 ===
Gjerta, who has occupied Barnverket, forces away the workers and gets a new worker gang who are villains, and her sister son Flemming Flink. Gjerta gives the 1st mission to the villain Ture Tvestjärt, who wants to steel the children's pets because he think the pets are ugly and hates them.

=== Part 3 ===
Ture Tvestjärt starts to steel the children's pets. When the children discover it, they shout for help and Stålhenrik's emergency alarm on the Moon sounds, but Stålhenrik thinks that the alarm is not existing because the children are there on the Earth and Stålhenrik and Supersnällasilversara are here on the Moon, but Supersnällasilversara says that they can help the children, because she can fly and Stålhenrik can hang on her back. When they come to the children on the Earth, they find seeds along a way and think the seeds are a hint and follow that way.

=== Part 4 ===
When Supersnällasilversara and Stålhenrik follow the seeds, they come to a tunnel where the pets are hidden, but they don't know that Ture Tvestjärt is the thief and when they go into the tunnel and the pets, Ture traps them in a big net.

=== Part 5 ===
Ture Tvestjärt calls Supersnällasilversara "stupid" so she becomes transformed to Supersurasunksara, who throws away the net and forces Ture to bring the pets back to the children. He learns how to love animals and gets a punishment; he must take care of the pets when the children are in school and their parents are busy with working.

=== Part 6 ===
The villain Anna Flabet hates reading, words and letters because she herself can't read and Gjerta gives her a machine which is able to use to reverse the letters of a word. The children shout for help and the superheroes come.

=== Part 7 ===
Supersnällasilversara and Stålhenrik find Anna Flabet at the library where she is on the roof and is going to reverse the letters of every word in the whole world with a dish. When Stålhenrik finds her, she says that the machine belongs to her and after that she reverses Stålhenrik so he talks with reversed letters.

=== Part 8 ===
Supersnällasilversara doesn't understand what Stålhenrik says. When she finds Anna Flabet, Stålhenrik tries to tell her that she is the thief but Supersnällasilversara doesn't care him and helps Anna Flabet to reverse all words of the world with the machine. After that Anna calls Supersnällasilversara "stupid" so Supersurasunksara comes, and she forces Anna to repeat the words but Anna doesn't know how to do. Stålhenrik knows and tries to say it but can't speak properly. Then Supersurasunksara becomes angry and shakes him, so he becomes well again and can speak properly. Then he himself presses the repeat button on the machine. Anna Flabet learns to read and must read for children in the library. Gjerta becomes angry when she has lost one more villain and forces the other villains to super-train.

=== Part 9 ===
The clumsy villain Klante Volante, who comes from a tightrope walker family, hates laughing people and remembers that people always laughed to him when he was a tightrope walker and always fell and he wants to destroy laughing. Gjerta gives him a spray-machine which can make laughing people quiet.

=== Part 10 ===
Klante Volante goes to school with his spray-machine and makes the children quiet from laughing with the spray. They shout for help and Supersnällasilversara and Stålhenrik come. They go to a circus and then Supersnällasilversara laughs to Klante who can't walk upstairs without falling, and when he shows the spray-machine, they understand that he is the laughing-vandal.

=== Part 11 ===
Klante calls Supersnällasilversara "stupid" so she becomes transformed to Supersurasunksara, who runs after him into the circus tent, where he walks on the tightrope, trying to escape. He can walk on a tightrope very well, but Supersurasunksara, who can't, falls down and then Klante laughs to her because she's so funny. He thinks laughing is funny but can't make children to laugh again, but Stålhenrik believes that the machine may have a reverse-button which can make people laughing again. He sprays himself so much that he laughs very much, so much that he "infects" the children with his laughing. Now Gjerta knows how Supersnällasilversara may be transformed to Supersurasunksara.

=== Part 12 ===
The Tinnitus Triplets hates music and steel the children's music instrument, but when the superheroes come, they help them to sing and their music is back. Then Gjerta becomes angry and gives the Tinnitus Triplets a machine which is able to make the whole world quiet from music and sounds.

On Julstjärnan, Vega and Nova see "ghosts".

=== Part 13 ===
The "ghosts" aren't ghosts, they are Supersnällasilversara, Stålhenrik and the other pensioners on Julstjärnan, who are singing for them in a Saint Lucy procession. After that Stålhenrik continues with telling Vega and Nova about the Tinnitus Triplets in Hjältedådsboken:

The Tinnitus Triplets bring their sound-destroy-machine up on a mountain. Supersnällasilversara and Stålhenrik sing with the children but when the Tinnitus Triplets activate their machine it is quiet and crunching. The superheroes discover the triplets and the machine.

On Julstjärnan, Vega and Nova think that something strange is happening.

=== Part 14 ===
The Tinnitus Triplets call Supersnällasilversara "stupid" so she becomes transformed to Supersurasunksara, who forces them to stop destroying sounds, but it is impossible for her to hunt 3 villains. Stålhenrik asks them to let him sing a last song and when they sing with him, they think music is funny. Gjerta becomes angry and forces them out from Barnverket. The villain Frigolit Fragile thinks children, who run and destroy in his house of cards-museum, are stupid and wants to wake them up during the night.

=== Part 15 ===
Frigolit Fragile wakes the children up during the night and a villain gang help him but they give up and Frigolit must wake them up alone, but must hide himself when they shout for help and the superheroes come.

Julstjärnan is vibrating as an earthquake.

=== Part 16 ===
When Supersnällasilversara and Stålhenrik have discovered Frigolit Fragile, he escapes with his truck, but the superheroes follow it in the air and land on it. Then Supersnällasilversara sings a lullaby so Frigolit sleeps.

=== Part 17 ===
When Frigolit Fragile wakes up, he says "stupid" to Supersnällasilversara so she becomes transformed to Supersurasunksara. Frigolit explains that the children are running and destroying in his house of cards-museum and he wants to "punish" them. They come with him to his museum and then Supersurasunksara destroys a house and shows how to build it up and Stålhenrik fixes the problem. Now Gjerta only has Uni Sax left in the gang of villains.

=== Part 18 ===
In a TV-program, Uni Sax says that she wants everyone to be the same as herself and goes to the children's homes and forces them to give her their clothes and toys and use new clothes and her finger dolls, which are exactly the same as Uni's clothes and her finger doll, called Uno. Then the children shout for help and the superheroes come.

=== Part 19 ===
When Uni Sax continues with her TV-program, she says "stupid" and Supersnällasilversara, who hears it when she watches the program with the children and Stålhenrik, becomes angry and transformed to Supersurasunksara and forces Stålhenrik to come with her to Barnverket, where they find Uni and her little box with finger dolls, which are the same as Uno, is a proof. Supersurasunksara takes away Uno from Uni's finger and puts him in the box so it is impossible to find him, but when Uni knows that Uno has a spot of jam on his face, she knows that people aren't the same, they are unique. She and the superheroes broadcast a funny TV-program and Uni brings the clothes and toys back to the children, but Gjerta, who now is alone, makes a machine which she can use to speak with Supersurasunksara's own voice. When she says that Stålhenrik is a coward, who is not strong and can't fly, he becomes angry and sad and goes away from Supersurasunksara. She follows him, but Gjerta fools her so she can trap her in a jail. When Stålhenrik finds Gjerta, he thinks Gjerta is nice and she fools him with saying that parties are bad for children.

=== Part 20 ===
On Julstjärnan an alarm sounds. Suddenly it becomes dark but Hustomten brings back the light. Stålhenrik continues telling about when he destroyed the children's parties for Vega and Nova in Hjältedådsboken.

=== Part 21 ===
Vega and Nova thinks that Olga Hott on Julstjärnan is strange and they are spying at her house. But they must escape when Olga Hott's coming, but Hustomten allows them to sit on his sledge and drink hot chocolate milk.

=== Part 22 ===
When Stålhenrik destroys a party, the children run after him and he runs back to Barnverket, where Flemming Flink has unlocked the jail so Supersurasunksara can come out, and she and the children learn him to behave properly. Together they laugh to Gjerta when she falls so she escapes with a space rocket. Now Supersnällasilversara and Stålhenrik have read the end of the story in Hjältedådsboken, but when Vega and Nova play, they find a model of Gjerta's space rocket, and on the model it is written "X98" and then they become afraid! They have seen "X98" on Hustomten's sledge and understand that Gjerta is on Julstjärnan. When they ask Hustomten about Gjerta, he takes off his head, which is a mask, and after that they see a new face, Gjerta's face!

=== Part 23 ===
Gjerta, who knows that Vega and Nova have betrayed her, forces them to come with her down to a big cellar, which is the machine room of Julstjärnan. She tells them that she first came to a locked door and blew it up so Julstjärnan vibrated as an earthquake and the 2nd door did she open with Järn-Jerry's key which she stole, but first she was forced to brake the alarm code and deactivate the alarm. First she thought the code was "Påskhare" ("Easter Bunny"), but later she knew that it was "Jultomte" ("Christmas Father"). After that she shows Vega and Nova the Julstjärnan-ball, which prevents Julstjärnan from leaving the Julstjärnan-orbit and disappear in the space forever. When they know that Gjerta'll steal it, they run for help, but Gjerta traps them in a cage with a remote control, but they shout for help, as the children on the Earth, so their grandparents hear the alarm and come. Stålhenrik opens the cage and they tell them that Gjerta is here and she was dressed up as Hustomten. With the remote control Gjerta traps Stålhenrik with a magnet and fools Supersnällasilversara with showing her a cat who is trapped and when she tries to rescue it, she's trapped in adhesive. Vega, Nova and Stålhenrik sing a stupid song, trying to transform Supersnällasilversara to Supersurasunksara, but she can't be transformed because she's too old, but when Gjerta irritates her and repeats the song, she becomes transformed, but Gjerta stops her with an irritating game and can escape and takes away the ladder when she leaves the cellar. Vega tries to fly up but can't.

=== Part 24 ===
Vega tries to fly, and now she can! Nova hangs on her back and they fly up from the cellar and shout to the other pensioners on Julstjärnan to trap Gjerta. She tries to escape with her rocket, but the pensioners come and press it down and Gjerta's trapped, but she throws away the Julstjärnan-ball, but Nova can catch it with her mind now when her "thinking-power" is activated. They fly back to the cellar and put the ball on the own place and Julstjärnan is rescued. Olga Hott (real name Helga Het) from Hemliga högtidsenheten (the Secret Unit) takes care of Gjerta and promises that Gjerta'll be forced to go in "be-nice-school" and maybe she'll be nice and kind. The next day Nova and Vega become dubbed to the superheroes Super-Nova and Mega-Vega, and at the evening Stuntstina, who has finished her missions, comes for pick them up.
