= Grabben i graven bredvid =

- Directed by: Kjell Sundvall
- Screenplay by: Sara Heldt
- Based on: Grabben i graven bredvid by Katarina Mazetti
- Produced by: Börje Hansson; Charlotta Denward
- Starring: Elisabet Carlsson; Michael Nyqvist
- Cinematography: Philip Øgaard
- Release date: 2 August 2002 (Sweden)
- Running time: 94 minutes
- Country: Sweden
- Language: Swedish

Grabben i graven bredvid is a 2002 Swedish film directed by Kjell Sundvall.

== Cast ==
- Elisabet Carlsson as Desirée Wallin
- Michael Nyqvist as Benny Söderström
- Annika Olsson as Märta
- Anna Azcarate as Lilian
- Rolf Degerlund as Bengt-Göran
- Anita Heikkilä as Violet
