= Bengt Krantz =

Swedish opera singer (born 1952)

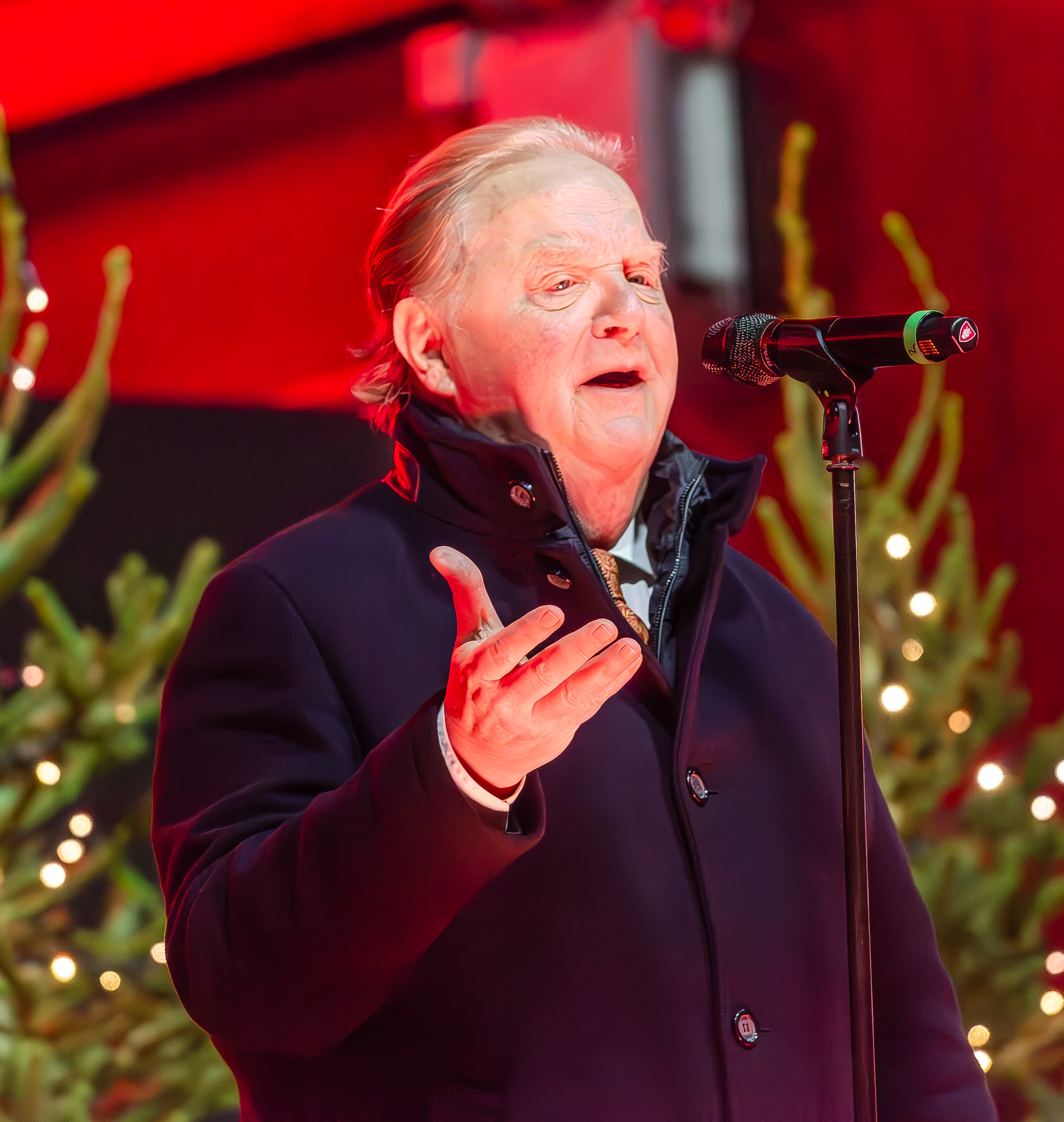
- Bengt Krantz during a concert by the Jussi Björlingsällskapet in Kungsträdgården, Stockholm (2025)

Background information
- Born: 29 June 1952 (age 74)
- Genre: Opera
- Partner: Maria Hegborn

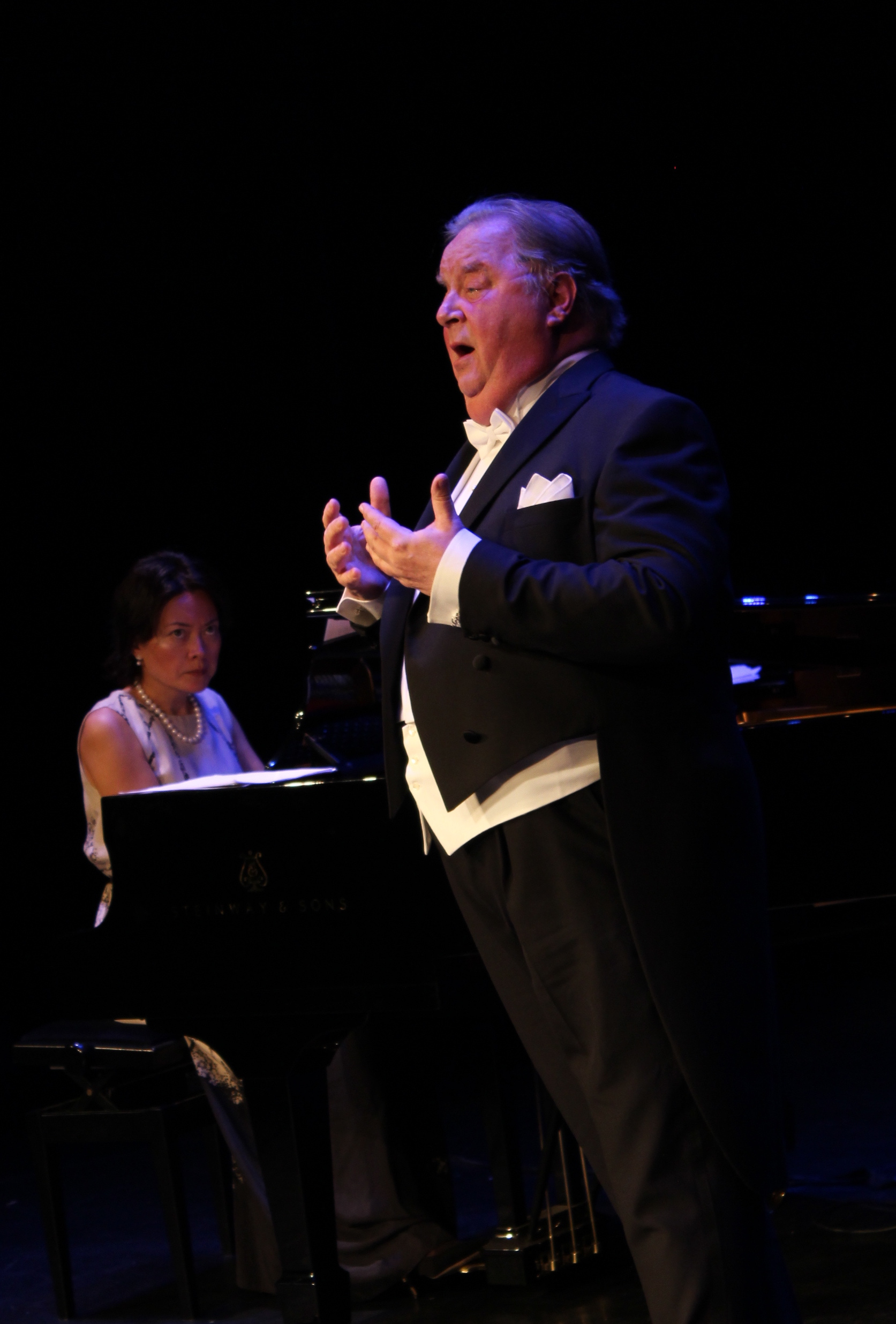
Bengt Krantz during a concert at Ystad Teater in 2018

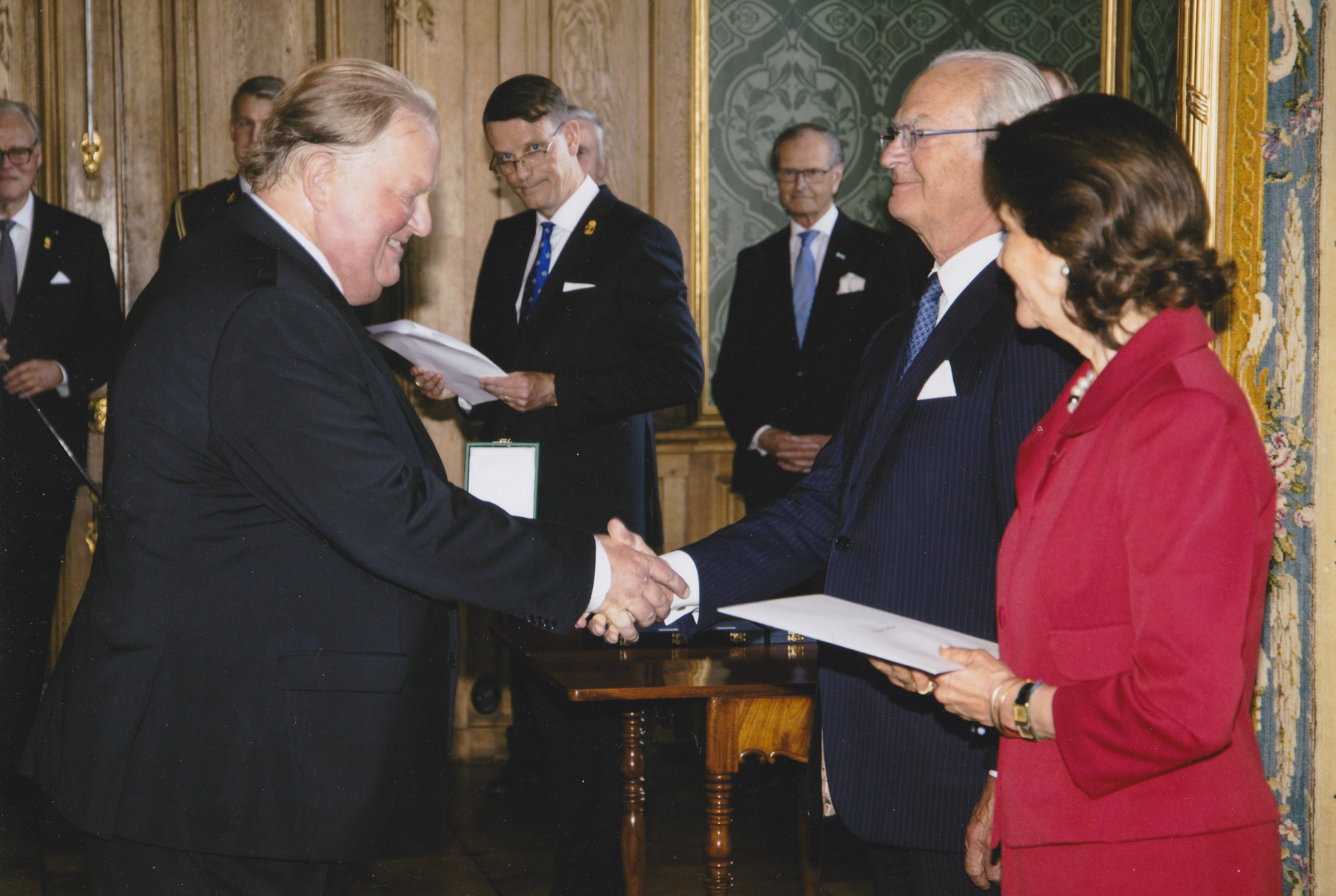
Bengt Krantz receives the medal Litteris et artibus at the Stockholm Castle on June 6, 2019.

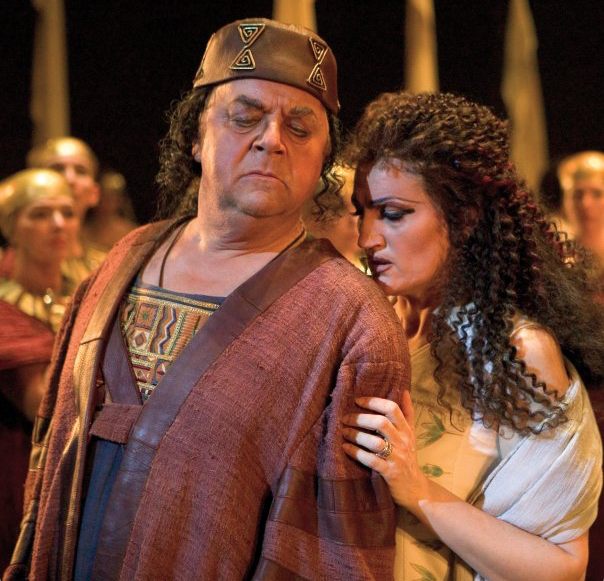
Bengt Krantz as Amonasro in Aida by Giuseppe Verdi, in a production at Malmö Opera. Here with the Italian soprano Simona Zambruno, who sang the title role.

Bengt Ingvar Krantz (born 29 June 1952) is a Swedish bass-baritone opera singer, actor and talking book reader.

Krantz was educated at Operastudio 67 1971–1974 and The University College of Opera in Stockholm. Krantz has performed more than 100 roles and worked at theatres as Folkoperan, Kungliga Operan, Värmlandsoperan and Malmö Opera och Musikteater. Among the roles can me mentioned Amonasro in Aida, Sharpless in Madama Butterfly, Ping in Turandot, Scarpia in Tosca, The Speaker and Papageno in The Magic Flute, the four bass roles in Les Contes de Hoffmann, Figaro in Il Barbiere di Sevilla, the title role in Macbeth, Jago in Otello and Swedenborg in the opera, especially written for him, Hemligheter (Secrets), where he portrays Emanuel Swedenborg. Krantz is since 2005 chairman for the Jussi Björlingsällskapet. (The Jussi Björling Society).

== Awards ==
- (Sweden) The medal Litteris et Artibus (2019) for outstanding contributions as opera singer.
- Svenska Dagbladets opera award (1987).
- The Journal Opera's opera award for the season of 1989–90.

== Filmography ==
- 1990 – The Orange Man, voyeuren (SVT Drama)
- 1991 – Facklorna, the singer (SVT Drama)
- 1997 – Snoken, Skenet bedrar, the cellist (SVT Drama)
- 1997 – Beck – Mannen med ikonerna, minister of Justice
- 1998 – Pip-Larssons, Episode 1:5, the brother
- 2007 – Underbar och älskad av alla, the actor
- 2011 – Tjuvarnas jul, the mayor

== Opera roles (selection) ==
=== Folkoperan ===
- Jacopo Foroni, Advokaten Pathelin, 1977
- Gian Carlo Menotti, The Old Maid and the Thief, 1982
- Georges Bizet, Carmen, 1982
- Giuseppe Verdi, Aida, Amonasro, 1985
- Kerstin Nerbe, Mumien vaknar, (for children), 1985
- Giacomo Puccini, Madama Butterfly, Sharpless, 1986
- Wolfgang Amadeus Mozart, Trollflöjten, the speaker, 1986
- Gioacchino Rossini, Barberaren i Sevilla, Figaro, 1989
- Jaques Offenbach, Hoffmanns äventyr, Lindorf, Copelius, Dr. Miracle, Dappertutto, 1990
- Camille Saint-Saëns, Simson och Delila, The High Priest, 1991
- Johann Strauss d.y., Les Comptes des Hoffmann, 1992
- Georg Riedel, Hemsöborna, 1994

=== Malmö Opera ===
- Benjamin Britten, A Midsummer NIghts Dream, Nick Bottom, 1993
- Giuseppe Verdi, Falstaff, title role, 1998
- Jag svänger de klockor du hör i din själ. Literally program at the 100-year memory of Hjalmar Gullberg, 1998
- Giacomo Puccini, Turandot, Ping, 1999. Reprise premiere 2000
- Ruggiero Leoncavallo, Pajazzo, Tonio, 1999
- Pildammskonsert, soloist, 1999
- Gaetano Donizetti, Regementets dotter, Sergeant Sulpice, 1999
- Pildammskonsert, soloist, 2000
- Giuseppe Verdi, Aida, Amonasro, 2000, Reprise premiere 2001, 2008
- Catharina Backman, The Portrait, George, 2000
- Claude-Michel Schönberg och Alain Boublil, Les Misérables, Monsieur Thenardiér.
- Giacomo Puccini, Tosca, Scarpia, 2001
- Kaspar Hauser, the mayor Tuscher, 2001
- Giuseppe Verdi, Requiem, soloist, 2001
- Charles Gounod, Faust, Méphistophélès, 2005 och 2007
- Giuseppe Verdi, Un Ballo in Maschera, Renato, 2006
- Giuseppe Verdi, Macbeth, Macbeth 2007
- Giacomo Puccini, La Fanciulla del West, Jack Rance 2007
- A variation of composers, Tour: Jag känner mig hågad att sjunga ett slag, Head Soloist, 2007
- Richard Strauss, Salome, 1st soldier, 2008
- Lars-Erik Larsson, The Princess of Cypress, Medon, 2008
- Andrew Lloyd Webber, Jesus Christ Superstar, Kajafas, 2008
- Giuseppe Verdi, La traviata, Giorgio Germont, 2008
- Jake Heggie, Dead Man Walking, George Benton, 2009
- Samuel Barber, Vanessa, The old doctor, 2009
- Jacques Offenbach, Pariserliv, barone de Gondremarck, 2009
- Gioacchino Rossini, Askungen, Don Magnifico, 2009
- Igor Stravinskij, Rucklarens väg, Nick Shadow, 2009
- Jonas Forssell, Hemligheter, Emanuel Swedenborg, 2011
- Jaques Offenbach, Les Comptes des Hoffmann, Luther, Crespel och Schlemil, 2011
- Georges Bizet, Carmen, Zuniga, 2012;
- Richard Wagner, Parsifal, Andere Gralsritter, 2012;
- Benjamin Britten, Let´s Make an Opera; Richard, Bob & Alfred
- Wolfgang Amadeus Mozart, Die Zauberflöte; the speaker, Förste prästen, The Man in Armor.
- Aribert Reimann, Lear; The King of France
- Giuseppe Verdi, La Traviata, Giorgio Germont
- Giacomo Puccini,La Boheme, Alcindoro
- Richard Strauss, Der Rosenkavallier, A Police Officer
- Charles Gounod, Romeo and Juliet, Brother Lorenzo, The Duke of Mantua
- Pyotr Ilyich Tchaikovsky, Eugen Onegin, The Captain & Zaretskij
- Lerner & Loewe, My Fair Lady, Alfred P. Dolittle
- W. A. Mozart, Le nozze di Figaro, Antonio
- Benjamin Staern, The Snow Queen, The Deer Bä
- Karl-Birger Blomdahl, Aniara, The third chief technician
- Joseph Bock, Fiddler on the Roof, Mordcha & The Commissionary
- Hans Gefors, Parken, Erstling

=== The Wermland Opera ===
- Richard Wagner, Den flygande holländaren, Daland, 1995
- Claude-Michel Schönberg och Alain Boublil, Les Misérables, Monsieur Thenardiér, 1996
- Umberto Giordano, Andrea Chénier, Gérard, 1997
- Giacomo Puccini, Tosca, Scarpia, 2000
- Gioacchino Rossini, Askungen, Don Magnifico, 2002
- Wolfgang Amadeus Mozart, Così fan tutte, Don Alfonso, 2006

=== Operafabriken ===
- 2015 – Barnaba in La Gioconda by Amilcare Ponchielli.
- 2016 – Jago in Otello by Giuseppe Verdi

== Theatre ==
=== Roles ===
Year	Role	Production	Direction	Theatre
1980	Pawlowitsch	Greven of Luxembourg; Franz Lehár, Alfred Maria Willner and Robert Bodansky	Ivo Cramér	Oscarsteatern
1995		Cyrano; Sebastian, Pierre Westerdahl and Fleming Enevold	Åsa Melldahl	Oscarsteatern
2005	Captain George Brackett	South Pacific; Richard Rodgers and Oscar Hammerstein	Åsa Melldahl	Malmö Opera
2017	Mordcha, manager of the inn	Fiddler on the Roof; Jerry Bock, Sheldon Harnick and Joseph Stein	Orpha Phelan	Malmö Opera
