= Katarina Mazetti =

Swedish author and journalist (1944–2025)

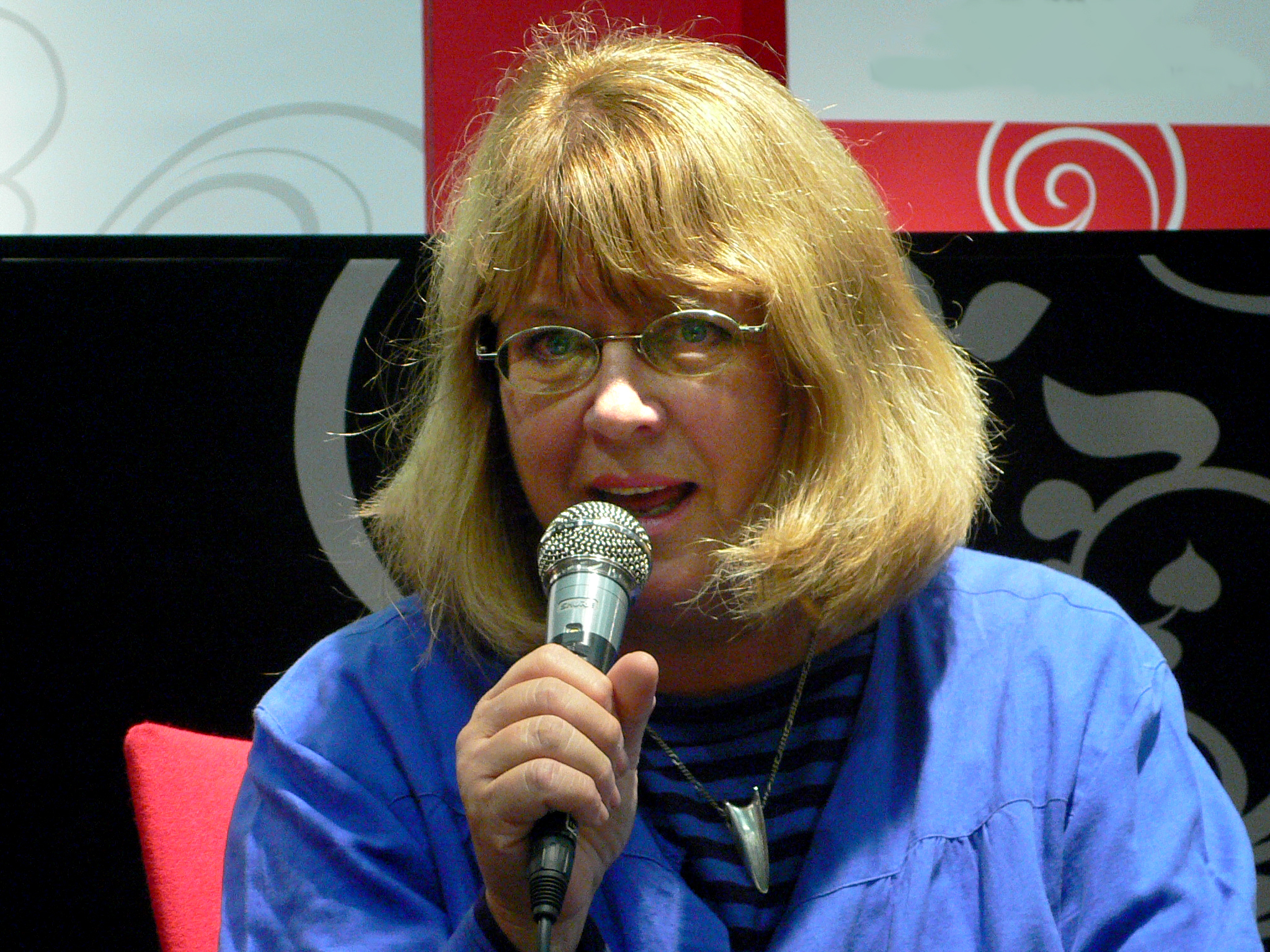
- Mazetti in 2007
- Born: Vera Katarina Mazetti; 29 April 1944; Stockholm, Sweden
- Died: 30 May 2025 (aged 81); Lund, Sweden
- Occupations: Author, journalist

Vera Katarina Mazetti (29 April 1944 – 30 May 2025) was a Swedish author and journalist. She made her debut as a writer in 1988 with the picture book "Här kommer tjocka släkten!". Mazetti worked as a producer and presenter at Sveriges Radio between 1989 and 2004. She died on 30 May 2025, at the age of 81.

== Bibliography ==
- Här kommer tjocka släkten (1988)
- Grod Jul på Näsbrännan eller Skuggan av en gris (1993)
- Handbok för martyrer (1993)
- Köttvars trollformler (1991)
- Det är slut mellan Gud och mej (1995)
- Det är slut mellan Rödluvan och vargen (1998)
- Den hungriga handväskan (1998)
- Grabben i graven bredvid (1999)
- Krigshjältar och konduktörer (1999)
- Mazettis blandning (2001)
- Fjärrkontrolleriet: äventyrs- och kärlekshistoria för barn (2001)
- Slutet är bara början (2002)
- Tyst! Du är död! (2001)
- Tarzans tårar (2003)
- Mazettis nya blandning (2004)
- Familjegraven: en fortsättning på romanen Grabben i graven bredvid (2005)
- Ottos äventyr (2005)
- Mitt himmelska kramdjur (2007)
- Slump (2008)
- Blandat blod (2008)
- Mitt liv som pingvin (2008)
