= Historieätarna =

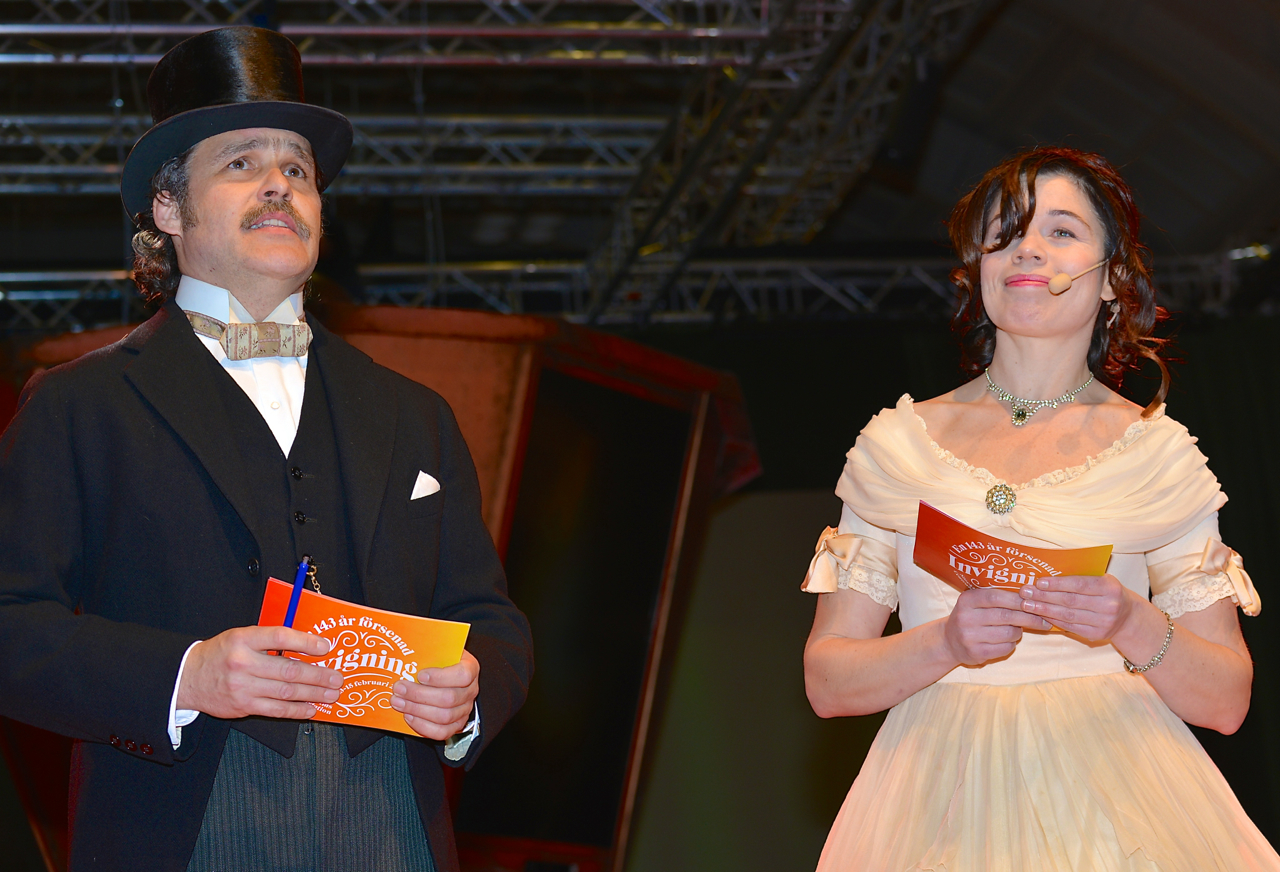
- Erik Haag and Lotta Lundgren at Stockholm Central Station in February 2014
- Genre: infotainment
- Presented by: Erik Haag, Lotta Lundgren
- Country of origin: Sweden
- Original language: Swedish
- No. of seasons: 3
- No. of episodes: 20

Production
- Executive producer: Karin af Klintberg
- Production location: Sweden
- Running time: about 60 minutes

Original release
- Network: SVT
- Release: 15 November 2012 – 19 December 2016

Related
- Tusen år till julafton; The Supersizers...

Historieätarna (The History Eaters) is an infotainment series that first appeared on Sveriges Television during autumn and winter 2012, produced by Karin af Klintberg, starring Erik Haag and Lotta Lundgren as the reporters and Fredrik Lindström and Björn Gustafsson as sidekicks. The British predecessor called The Supersizers... was first broadcast in 2007 on BBC2.

The program follows the two presenters as they "live" in a certain time period. They dress up in period accurate clothes, and live life as you would in that certain time period with a large emphasis on the food. Each program features a guest chef who prepares period accurate food.

On Boxing Day 2013, a Christmas special, Historieätarna firar jul (Historieätarna Celebrates Christmas) was aired. It featured various types of Christmas food and Christmas celebrations starting 1000 years ago and ending in modern times. A second season aired in autumn 2014, mostly following the same format, but without Lindström and Gustafsson.

A third season aired in autumn 2016, this season featured six different time periods including the 1950s, 1990s, medieval Sweden and Sweden under king Gustav III during the 18th century. It was originally reported that this third season would be the last, but SVT later announced that it was not decided for sure and that there may be more seasons in the future.

== Series overview ==
| Series | Episodes | Originally released | |
| Series | Episodes | First released | Last released |
|---|---|---|---|
| 1 | 6 | 15 November 2012 | 15 December 2012 |
| Special | | 26 December 2012 | |
| 2 | 7 | 17 November 2014 | 29 December 2014 |
| 3 | 6 | 14 November 2016 | 19 December 2016 |

== Episodes ==
=== Season 1 (2012) ===
| No. overall | No. in season | Title | Time period | Chef | Original release date |
|---|---|---|---|---|---|
| 1 | 1 | "Stormaktstiden" | Stormaktstiden (The Great Power Era) | Magnus Nilsson | 15 November 2012 |
| 2 | 2 | "1970-talet" | 1970s | Elisabet Johansson | 22 November 2012 |
| 3 | 3 | "Oskarianska eran" | Oskarianska eran, the Swedish Victorian Era during Oscar II's reign | Jens Linder | 29 November 2012 |
| 4 | 4 | "Det glada 1920-talet" | 1920s (the Roaring 1920s) | Paul Svensson | 6 December 2012 |
| 5 | 5 | "Frihetstiden" | Age of Liberty | Niklas Ekstedt | 13 December 2012 |
| 6 | 6 | "Beredskapstiden" | Sweden during World War II | Carina Brydling | 15 December 2012 |
Christmas Special
| 7 | 7 | "Julmatspecial" | Christmas Food Special | TBA | 26 December 2013 |

=== Season 2 (2014) ===
| No. overall | No. in season | Title | Time period | Chef | Original release date |
|---|---|---|---|---|---|
| 8 | 1 | "Romantiken" | Romanticism (1809–1844) | Tareq Taylor | 17 November 2014 |
| 9 | 2 | "1960-talet" | 1960s | Ingela Persson | 24 November 2014 |
| 10 | 3 | "Nationalromantiken" | Romantic nationalism (circa 1900-1914) | Malin Söderström | 1 December 2014 |
| 11 | 4 | "1980-talet" | 1980s | Stefano Cattenacci | 8 December 2014 |
| 12 | 5 | "Vasatiden" | 16th century | Elisabet Johansson | 15 December 2014 |
| 13 | 6 | "1930-talet" | 1930s | Jens Linder | 22 December 2014 |
Compilation episode
| 14 | 7 | "Best of Historieätarna" | Compilation episode | Compilation episode | 29 December 2014 |

=== Season 3 (2016) ===
| No. overall | No. in season | Title | Time period | Chef | Original release date |
|---|---|---|---|---|---|
| 15 | 1 | "Industrialismen" | 1840–1890 | Frida Ronge | 14 November 2016 |
| 16 | 2 | "Efterkrigstiden" | Post-World War II-period (1945–1959) | Linn Söderström | 21 November 2016 |
| 17 | 3 | "Hedvig Eleonoras tid" | Days of Hedvig Eleonora | Filip Fastén | 28 November 2016 |
| 18 | 4 | "Nittiotalet" | 1990–2000 | Lisa Lemke | 5 December 2016 |
| 19 | 5 | "Gustavianska tiden" | 1772–1792 | Zvonko Sokcic | 12 December 2016 |
| 20 | 6 | "Nollnolltalet" | 2000–2010 | Susanne Jonsson | 19 December 2016 |
