= Behind Blue Skies =

2010 film

- Directed by: Hannes Holm
- Starring: Bill Skarsgård; Peter Dalle
- Release date: 10 September 2010 (TIFF)
- Running time: 1h 50min
- Country: Sweden
- Language: Swedish

Behind Blue Skies (Swedish: Himlen är oskyldigt blå) is a 2010 Swedish drama film directed by Hannes Holm.

== Cast ==
- Bill Skarsgård - Martin
- Peter Dalle - Gösta
- Josefin Ljungman - Jenny
- Amanda Ooms - Siv
- Björn Kjellman - Nils
- Adam Pålsson - Micke
- Rasmus Troedsson - Ulf
- Annika Olsson - Ann-Britt
- Peter Engman - Kenta
- Gustave Lund - Nalle
- Erik Johansson - Jonte
- Stig Engström - Fritz
- Elin Klinga - Marketta
- Leif Andrée - Stig

== Production ==
In the infamous fellatio scene between Josefin Ljungman and Bill Skarsgård, a prosthesis was used.
