= Hem till Midgård =

Swedish television series

Hem till Midgård ("Home to Midgard") is a Swedish sit-com which ran on TV4 in Sweden during 2003. The name is a pun of the classic Swedish TV-series Hem till byn as well as Emmerdale which is known as Hem till gården (Home to the farm) in Sweden.

The series was created and written by Per Simonsson, Fredde Granberg, Johan Petersson and Stefan Roos. The later three also (among others) starred in the show. In total 2 seasons of 12 episodes each were produced before the show was canceled.

== Plot ==
The setting is 992 in Sweden, in a suburb of Birka called Midgård, which is the last village in Sweden where people still believe in the old Norse gods. Meanwhile, the real chieftain Snorre den Store (Snorre the Great, but with the alternative meaning "big willie") is away plundering in the Mediterranean. His youngest son Lill-Snorre (Little-Snorre or "little willie") is in charge of the village, and forced to guard his father's Byzantine thrall Cassandra, who Lill-Snorre also falls in love with.

The episodes usually feature Lill-Snorre and his not so great men attempting a new scheme to get money (which they are notoriously short on), sometimes by Plundering and sometimes by more honest means, or Lill-Snorre trying to impress Cassandra and outshine Rövhalt.

== Style ==
The series are often considered childish as the episodes contain a lot of Toilet humor and vulgar language as well as plenty of face punches, groin kicks and eye pokes, often with an added sound effect. The swear words used are often with references to the Old Norse gods, for example "Baldur's balls", "Freya's boob" and "Ymir's giant ass".

== Main characters ==
=== Lill-Snorre ===
Portrayed by Fredde Granberg. His name means "Little-Willie". The opposite of the stereotypical Viking; cannot stand the sea or see blood without vomiting violently. He is laughed at by his friends for the small genitals implied by his name. Although he is more intelligent than others, he is shy and cowardly, and cannot face an argument with Cassandra without stuttering, sweating and sometimes even crying. He is afraid to say openly that he and Cassandra are a couple, since his father would probably kill him if he found out. He has an ability to think up quick comebacks whenever Halvdan insults or questions him, often followed by a groin-kick.

=== Cassandra ===
Portrayed by Sara Sommerfeld. A beautiful slave from Byzantium (although her former boyfriend appeared to be Spanish). She is Lill-Snorre's girlfriend, and although she often assaults Lill-Snorre when he does something stupid or appears (mostly by mistake) with another woman and bullies him about his penis size, they are in love. When Lill-Snorre tries to argue with her, he shutters and barely succeeds in saying what he wants. She is very spoiled and must always have what she wants.

=== Tyke Mörbult ===
Portrayed by Marko Lehtosalo. His name means "Tyke Tender-Pounder" or "Tyke Mauler" (mörbulta = "to maul", from mör = "tender" and bulta = "to pound"). Raised in Midgård, although from his accent, he appears to be Finnish. The resident berserker, he seems to have a learning disability as he is often drooling and does not use words such as "you" or "I" (basically speaking in Third person). Calling him dumb or insulting Lill-Snorre (or annoying Tyke in general) is not a good idea as he may hit his adversary with his club. Lill-Snorre does not look down upon him as he does with Runar or Halvdan, as he knows that hitting Tyke will result in fighting back, unlike Halvdan and Runar who only take their punishment. Instead Lill-Snorre favours him as his best ally, and because of this, Tyke is very loyal to Lill-Snorre.

=== Runar Tvålfager ===
Portrayed by Johan Petersson. His name means "Runar Pretty-Boy". Blond, tall and strong, he is known as the "sex-machine from Mälaren", and prone to jumping into the sack with anything female (including the Queen of Sweden and Lill-Snorre's mother) but he is utterly unintelligent. Lill-Snorre often beats him when he asks stupid questions. Runar is the member of the group who ruins Lill-Snorre's situations the most.

=== Halvdan Glappkäft ===
Portrayed by Stefan Roos. His name means "Half-done Blabbermouth". He is considered the most annoying member of the group, and his laugh sounds like a goat. He is the smartest member, but also the least respected, Lill-Snorre neglects to refer him as a member of the crew, and calls him Gunilla. Halvdan competes with Runar for his rank as sex-machine, and Lill-Snorre's rank as a chief because he is weak as a chief. However, Halvdan is the only member of the group that Lill-Snorre can feel superior to, and is most often on the receiving end of his eye-pokes and groin-kicks. Tyke also beats him up on a regular basis.

=== Gammelman ===
Portrayed by Rolf Skoglund. Gammelman (name meaning "old man") is the (somewhat senile) elder of the Midgard village, he is an Aesir Gothi aged around 100. He is sexually kinky and often refers to the gods' sexual parts when he is talking about them. He uses unrecommended methods to heal people, such as pouring hot water in the anus of the king when he has toothache. He often intends to sacrifice the monk Peter Nicolaus.

=== Rövhalt ===
Played by Per Morberg. A rich trader from Birka and an old "comrade" of Lill-Snorre's father, he often tries to charm Cassandra. He received his name (which means "arse-limp") because Snorre den Store cut his left buttock off when fighting over Cassandra in Byzantium. He often makes fun of Lill-Snorre, but Lill-Snorre does not dare retaliate because of Rövhalt's position. On the other hand, Gammelman, who is not afraid of anything, has called him "the man who takes half price for ham'" (due to the Swedish word "skinka" meaning both "ham" and "buttock" in English).

=== Peter Nicolaus the monk ===
Played by Mikael Riesebeck. Nicolaus was sent to Midgard by the Pope as a punishment for an incident with the Pope's sisters. He is picked on and threatened by Gammelman that he will be made a sacrificial victim. Cassandra is apparently his only defense, because she wants a Latin teacher. He is called "Petter-Niklas" (which is a nickname for "Penis") by Lill-Snorre and the other Vikings. The Vikings force him to make mead for them regularly.

== Recurring characters ==
=== Snorre den Store ===
Played by Anders Ahlbom. Lill-Snorre's father, and portrayed as being extremely masculine, and the exact opposite of Lill-Snorre. He is famous for have set fire to Paris single-handedly, and raped half of Rome. He has set to sea with his seven strongest sons, leaving Lill-Snorre to guard Cassandra in Midgård.
