= Carl Carlswärd =

Swedish actor

Carl Carlswärd (born Carl-Lennart Karlsvärd 27 October 1949, in Stockholm) is a Swedish actor.

== Selected filmography ==
- 1986 – Ormens väg på hälleberget
- 1988 – Kråsnålen (TV)
- 1989 – Tre kärlekar (TV)
- 1991 – Sunes jul (TV)
- 1992 – En komikers uppväxt (TV)
- 1993 – Rederiet (TV)
- 1994 – Den vite riddaren (TV)
- 1997 – Beck – Lockpojken
- 1999 – Jakten på en mördare
- 2003 – Tusenbröder (TV)
- 2011 – Tjuvarnas jul (TV, Julkalendern)
- 2016 – Selmas saga (TV, Julkalendern)
