= Tusen år till julafton =

- Genre: children
- Starring: Erik Haag; Lotta Lundgren; Kakan Hermansson; Olof Wretling; Shima Niavarani
- Country of origin: Sweden
- Original language: Swedish
- No. of seasons: 1
- No. of episodes: 24

Production
- Producer: Karin af Klintberg
- Production company: Thelma/Louise

Original release
- Network: SVT1; Barnkanalen
- Release: 1 December – 24 December 2015

Related
- Piratskattens hemlighet (2014); Selmas saga (2016)

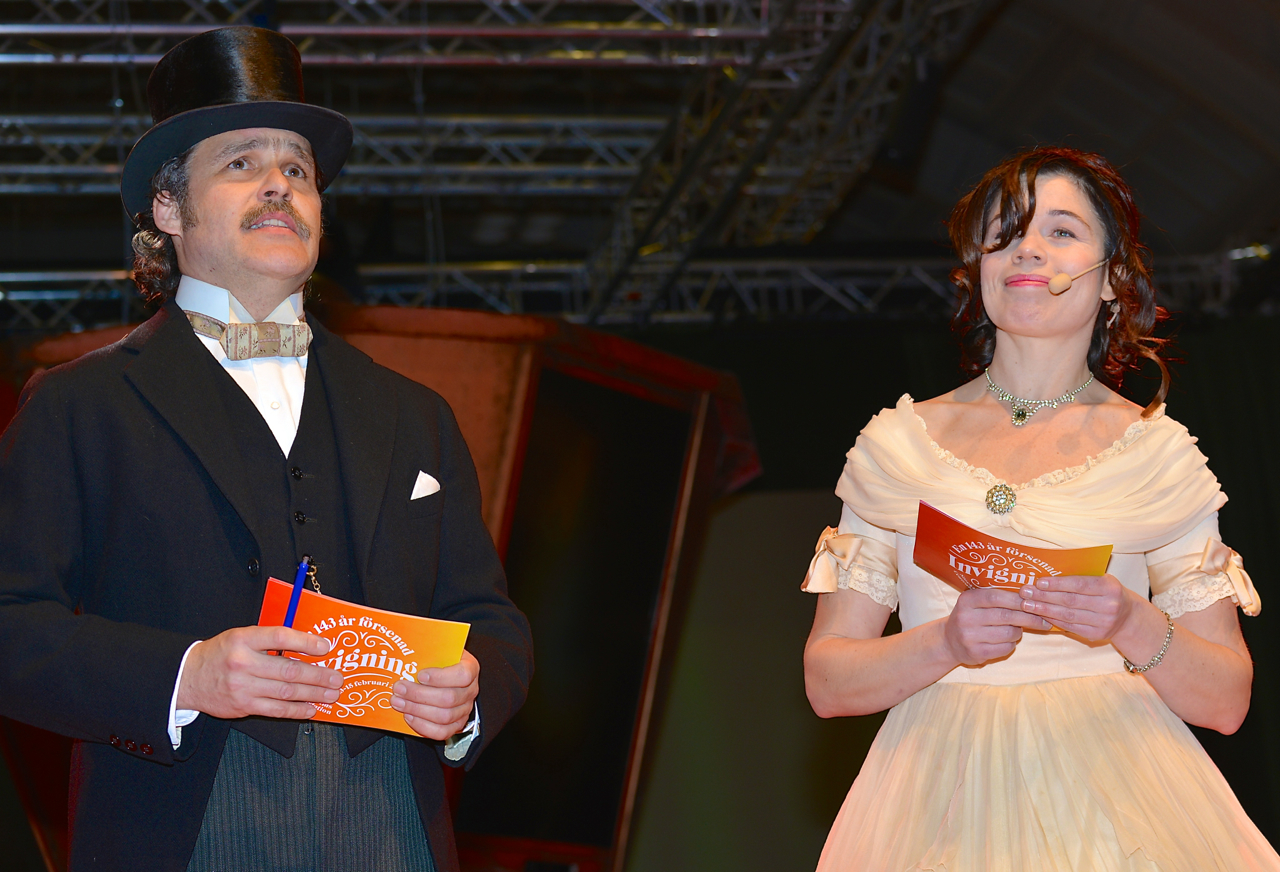
Erik Haag and Lotta Lundgren

Tusen år till julafton is the Sveriges Television's Christmas calendar for 2015. It features Erik Haag and Lotta Lundgren as they travel through the years to discover what children have eaten throughout a time-span of a thousand years. It is a spin-off from Historieätarna.
