= Josefin Ljungman =

Swedish actress (born 1981)

Josefin Sofia Isabelle Ljungman
- Born: 26 December 1981 (age 44); Gothenburg, Sweden
- Occupation: Actress
- Years active: 2005-

Josefin Sofia Isabelle Ljungman (born 26 December 1981) is a Swedish actress.

== Biography ==
Josefin Ljungman was born on 26 December 1981 in Gothenburg, Sweden. Since 2005, she has appeared at several theatres including Backa Theater in Gothenburg, Riks Theatre and Dramaten. In 2008, she acted in The Wild Duck directed by Thommy Berggren at the Stockholm City Theater, in which her role was widely appreciated. She also starred in the 2007 film Hata Gothenburg. In autumn 2009 she took a break from acting and went to Paris for higher studies. In 2010, she starred in the critically acclaimed drama film Himlen är oskyldigt blå and the horror film Psalm 21. In 2012, Ljungman appeared in the Radio Theater Red and Black, directed by Jonas Cornell. In the film I love no one (2012), she plays herself.

== Filmography ==
- 2005 – Kärlek 2000 (shortfilm)
- 2005 – Tjejen med videokameran (shortfilm)
- 2006 – Bota mig! (TV-series)
- 2007 – Arn – Tempelriddaren
- 2007 – August (TV-series)
- 2007 – Hata Göteborg
- 2007 – Pyramiden
- 2008 – Fatso
- 2009 – Kärlekens krigare
- 2010 – Himlen är oskyldigt blå
- 2010 – Psalm 21
- 2011 – Förväntningar (shortfilm)
- 2012 – Mig älskar ingen
- 2015 – Boys (TV-series)
