= Sara Edwardsson =

Swedish actress, TV-host and singer (born 1971)

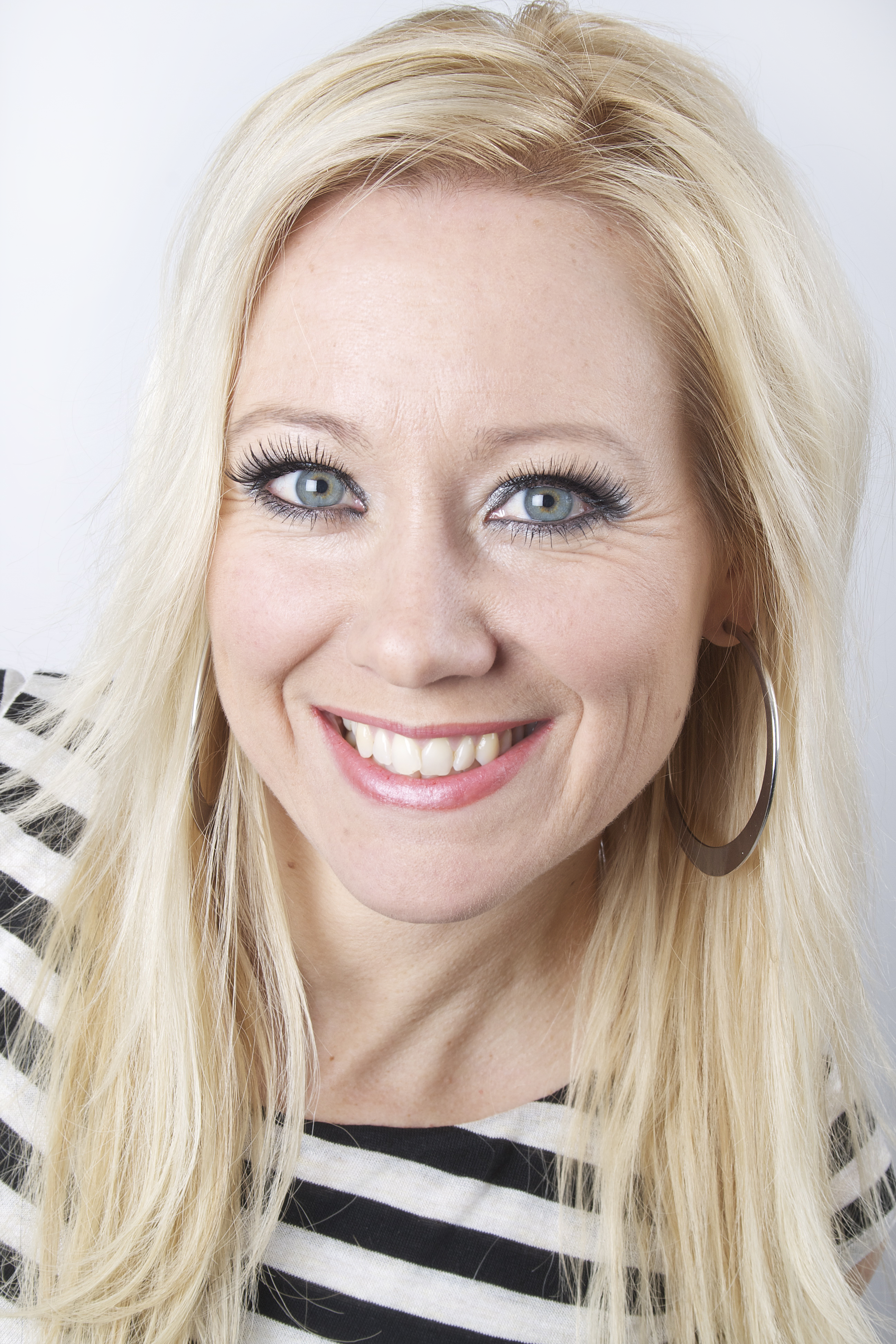
- Sara Edwardsson in 2011
- Born: Sara Kristina Edwardsson; 24 June 1971 (age 54); Uppsala, Sweden
- Occupations: Actress; TV-host; Singer

Sara Kristina Edwardsson (born 24 June 1971) is a Swedish actress, TV-host and singer.

Edwardsson hosts, among other programmes, Bolibompa and Världens största kör, and played Supersnällasilversara, Supersurasunksara and Stuntstina in Supersnällasilversara och Stålhenrik and Superhjältejul. She was host of the music show Musikbyrån from 1996 to 1998.

On scene, she has, among other things, played Hedvig in Från A till Ö. From the fall of 2008, she was seen again as a host of kids' TV program Bolibompa. Edwardsson has been singer in the group Le Fox releasing the album P-e-o-p-l-e-g-e-t-h-a-p-p-y.

== Discography ==
=== Albums ===
as part of Le Fox

- P-e-o-p-l-e-g-e-t-h-a-p-p-y

solo

Year	Album	Peak Position	Certifications	Notes
Year	Album	SWE	Certifications	Notes
2012	Dansbarn	15		
