= Boy Machine =

Swedish 2015 comedy television series

- Country of origin: Sweden
- Original language: Swedish

Original release
- Network: TV4
- Release: 16 October 2015

Boy Machine is a Swedish comedy series that started airing on October 16, 2015 on TV4. The series follows the story of a fictitious boyband called Boy Machine. An extremely popular boyband in the 1990s, the now much older men try to make a comeback. Besides friction within the group they also encounter competition from a young boyband duo called Stargaze.

== Cast Members ==
- Peter Magnusson
- Jonas Karlsson
- Henrik Dorsin
- David Wiberg
- Karan Exclusive
- Emma Peters
- Jonna Delvert
- Shima Niavarani
