= Shima Niavarani =

Swedish actress and singer (born 1985)

Shima
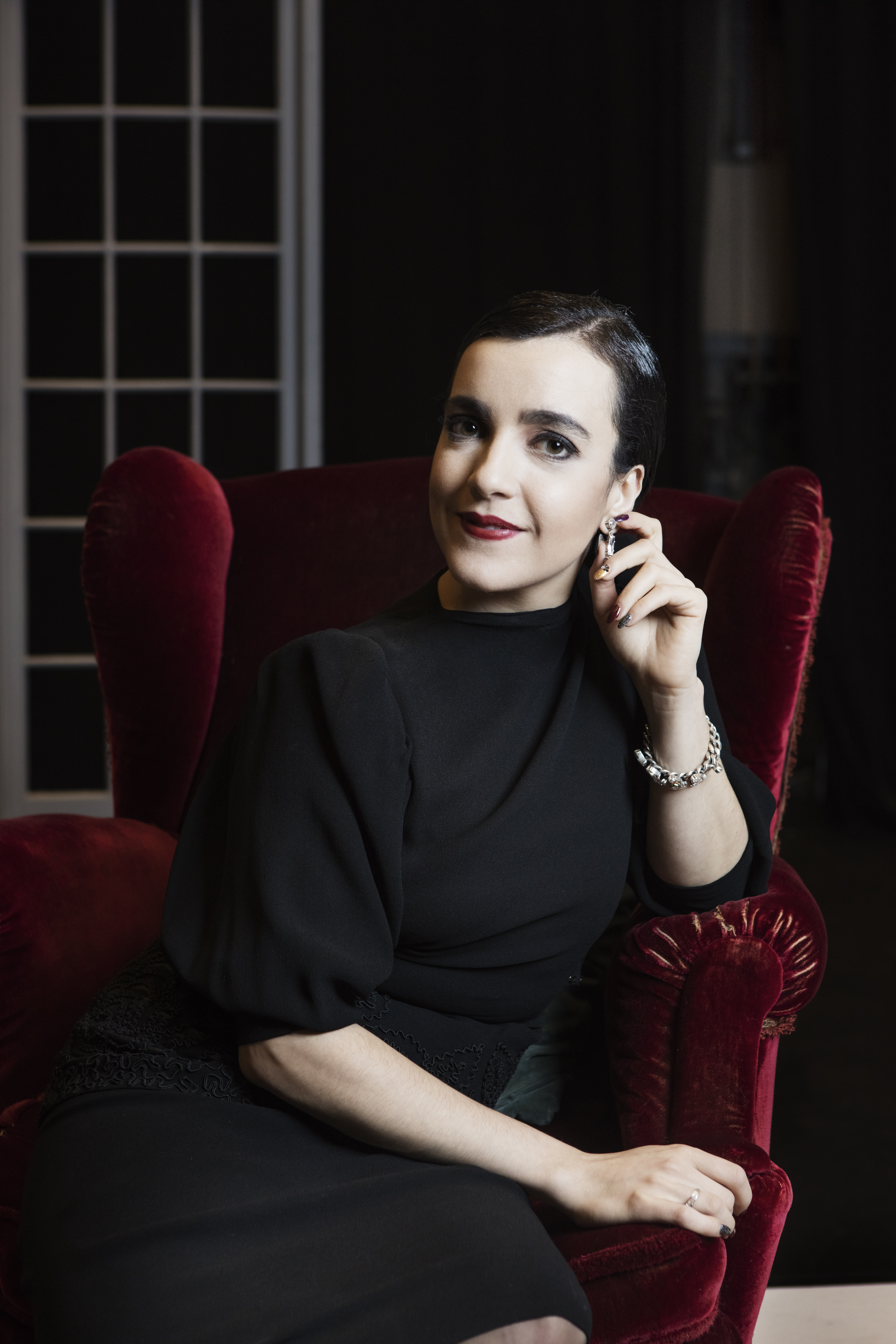
- Shima Niavarani
- Born: 7 July 1985 (age 41); Teheran, Iran
- Occupations: Actress, singer

Shima Niavarani (Persian: شیما نیاورانی; born 7 July 1985 in Teheran) is an Iranian-Swedish actress and singer. She has performed in theater, film, television and radio in over 40 productions. Niavarani got her breakthrough at the age of nineteen in the play Autodidakt i enmansakt which she directed and played in. She toured with the play for over a year and her work received several awards. She is perhaps most known for her solo-musical Shima Niavarani är en Übermensch which was broadcast on SVT in 2010, and for her role as "Maiken" in the TV4 series Allt faller which was directed by Henrik Schyffert.

== Career ==
Shima has acted at the Royal Dramatic Theatre, Stockholm City Theatre, Södra Teatern, Radioteatern, National Swedish Touring Theatre, and other stages. During 2007, she got the main lead role as the widow Queck in Bertolt Brecht:s Bageriet. In 2008, she played the lead role as "Hedvig" in Göran Tunströms "Tjuven" at Uppsala stadsteater. Other roles at that theater is the play Drottning Kristina, Rigoletto and the play Knutby about the Knutby murder.

In the newspaper Dagens Nyheter summary of the year in theater for 2009 Niavarani was mentioned for her memorable role in Drottning Kristina. Shima Niavarani has also acted in film and television. She had the lead role in Simon Stahos film "Kärlekens Krigare". At Dagens Nyheter she got the award of "En av morgondagens filmstjärnor". She has also acted in SVTs Julkalender "Gyllene Knorren", the series Livet i Fagervik and she has also been a panel member at SVTs Gomorron Sverige and a frequent at TV4s Nyhetsmorgon. Niavarani is known for her comedy character which can be heard in Sveriges Radios P3 humor shows "Lilla Al Fadji", "Bröllopsreportern" and "Humorhimlen". But also drama productions such as "Rödluvan och vargarna" in which she played Little Red Riding Hood.

On 22 July 2014, Niavarani participated in Allsång på Skansen and sang two songs, one of which was her own song "Shimmy Shimmy Shimmy Shine".

In 2015, she acted in the comedy series Boy Machine which was broadcast on TV4. And that same year she presented the move show Filmkväll med Shima at SVT.

She had the leading role in the film She's Wild Again Tonight which premiered on 12 November. She also acted in SVTs Christmas calendar called Tusen år till julafton along with Lotta Lundgren and Erik Haag. In 2016 she will act in season two of the SVT series 30 grader i februari.

On 15 April 2023, Niavarani was a guest judge in the episode Diva Assoluta of the Swedish language reality television series Drag Race Sverige broadcast on SVT1 and SVT Play.

== Selected filmography ==
- 2009 – Kärlekens krigare
- 2009 – Livet i Fagervik
- 2013 – Allt faller
- 2014 – Something Must Break
- 2014 – Krakel Spektakel
- 2019 – A Piece of My Heart
- 2025 -Handbok för superhjältar
