= Elisabet Carlsson =

Swedish actress

- Born: 9 January 1968 (age 57); Östra Göinge, Sweden

Elisabet Carlsson (born 9 January 1968) is a Swedish actress. She studied at the Swedish National Academy of Mime and Acting in Stockholm 1988–1992. She is married to the actor Stefan Roos and together they have a daughter.

== Filmography ==
- Angel (2008)
- Predikanten (2007)
- Isprinsessan (2007)
- Järnets änglar (2007)
- Beck – I Guds namn (2007)
- Beck – Flickan i jordkällaren (2006)
- Beck – Skarpt läge (2006)
- 2005 – En decemberdröm
- Four Shades of Brown (2004)
- 2004 – Allt och lite till
- 2002 – Dieselråttor och sjömansmöss
- Grabben i graven bredvid (2002)
- Woman with Birthmark (2001)
