= Gunnarsbyn =

- Location within Norrbotten Location within Sweden
- Coordinates: 66°2′N 21°55′E
- Country: Sweden
- Province: Norrbotten
- County: Norrbotten County
- Municipality: Boden Municipality

Area
  - Total: 091 km^{2} (35 sq mi)

Population (31 December 2005)
  - Total: 169
  - Density: 185/km^{2} (480/sq mi)
- Time zone: UTC+1 (CET)
  - Summer (DST): UTC+2 (CEST)

Gunnarsbyn is a village located in Boden Municipality, Sweden, at Råne River, 70 km north of Luleå and almost 45 km north of Boden.

== References and sources ==
- www.boden.se/
