= Henrik Ståhl =

TV and theatre actor

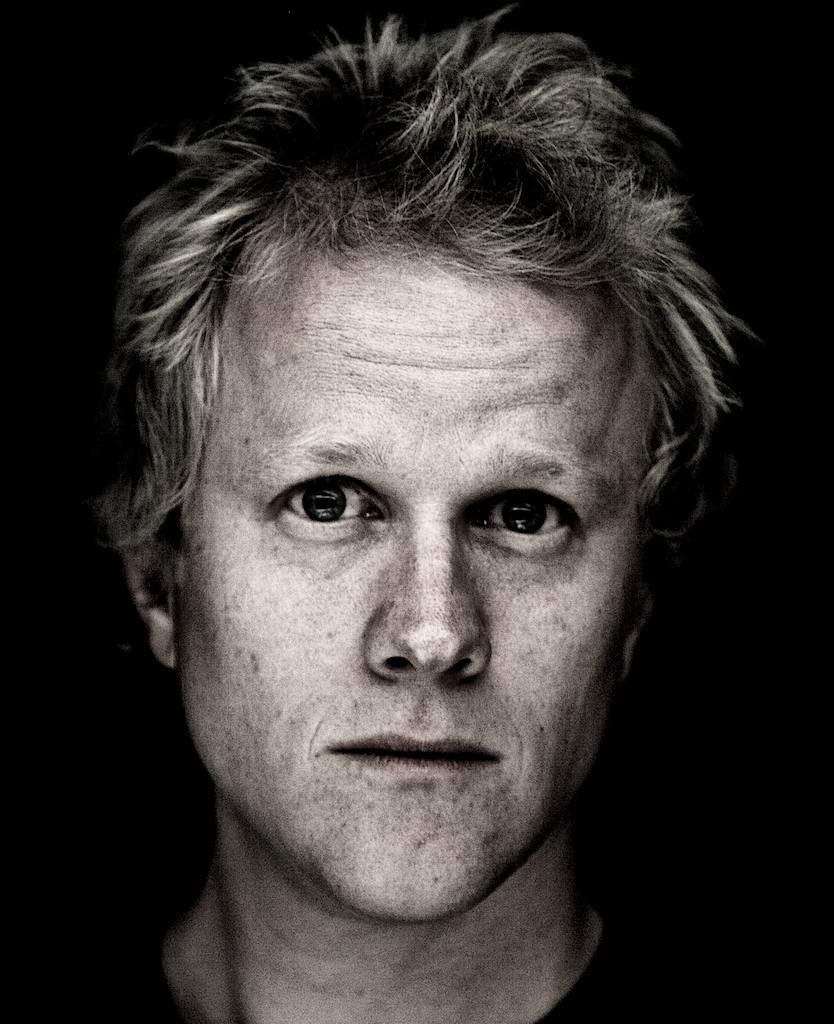
Henrik Ståhl in 2010

Jon Henrik Ståhl (born 31 July 1975) is a Swedish actor, playwright, author (among the 2003 book Livskartan) and television host. He studied at Gothenburg Theatre Academy 1995–99. He hosted the children's TV program Bolibompa 1999–2004. He has participated in many Sveriges Television programmes, among them Supersnällasilversara och Stålhenrik and Pomos piano. He has travelled around in Sweden and performed his own play Henrik – en tönt which is about mobbing.
