= Lotta Lundgren =

Swedish television host and food writer (born 1971)

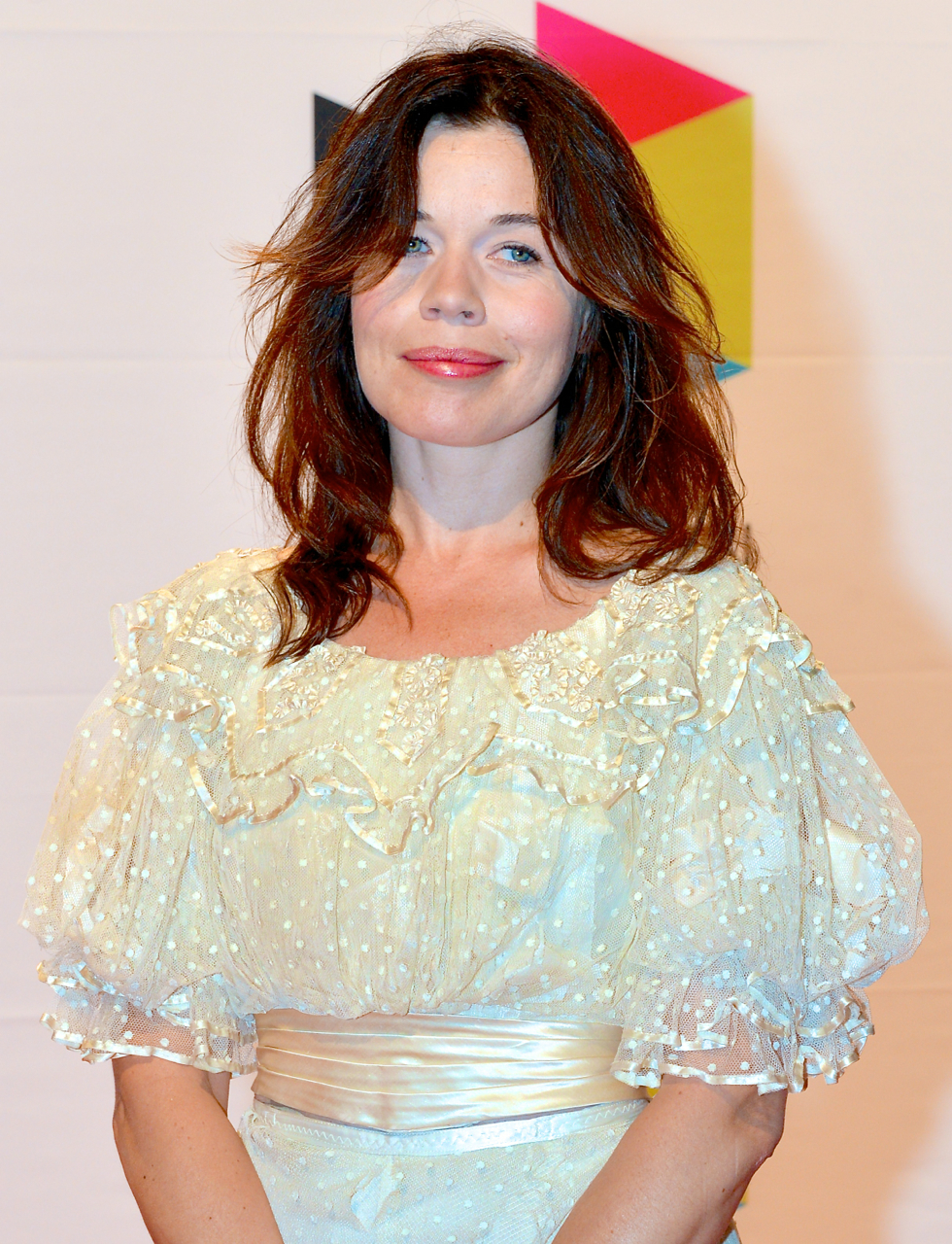
- Lundgren in 2013
- Born: Lotta Mari Bergqvist; 26 January 1971 (age 55); Sweden
- Occupations: Television presenter, food author
- Spouse: Martin Johansen (m. 2009; div. 2014)
- Partner: Erik Haag
- Children: 2 (with Johansen)

Lotta Mari Johansen Lundgren (née Bergqvist; born 26 January 1971) is a Swedish television presenter and food writer.

Lundgren was born and raised in Tuve, a Gothenburg suburb. Lundgren has written a cook book. She has hosted the shows Landet Brunsås and currently Historieätarna along with Erik Haag both on SVT. In 2015, the duo presented Tusen år till julafton, a Christmas calendar broadcast on SVT. The same production team is also behind Bye bye Sverige about the Swedish-American emigration 1850–1910 which premiered on Swedish Television on 7 December 2017. In 2020, Lotta and Erik Haag participated in Filip and Fredrik's Alla mot alla, where they won the final against Gry Forssell and Mikael Tornving. The team also won the season the following year by Alla mot alla.

== Personal life ==
Lundgren divorced her husband in December 2013. As of 2016, she has a relationship with TV colleague Erik Haag.
