= Peter Engman =

Swedish actor

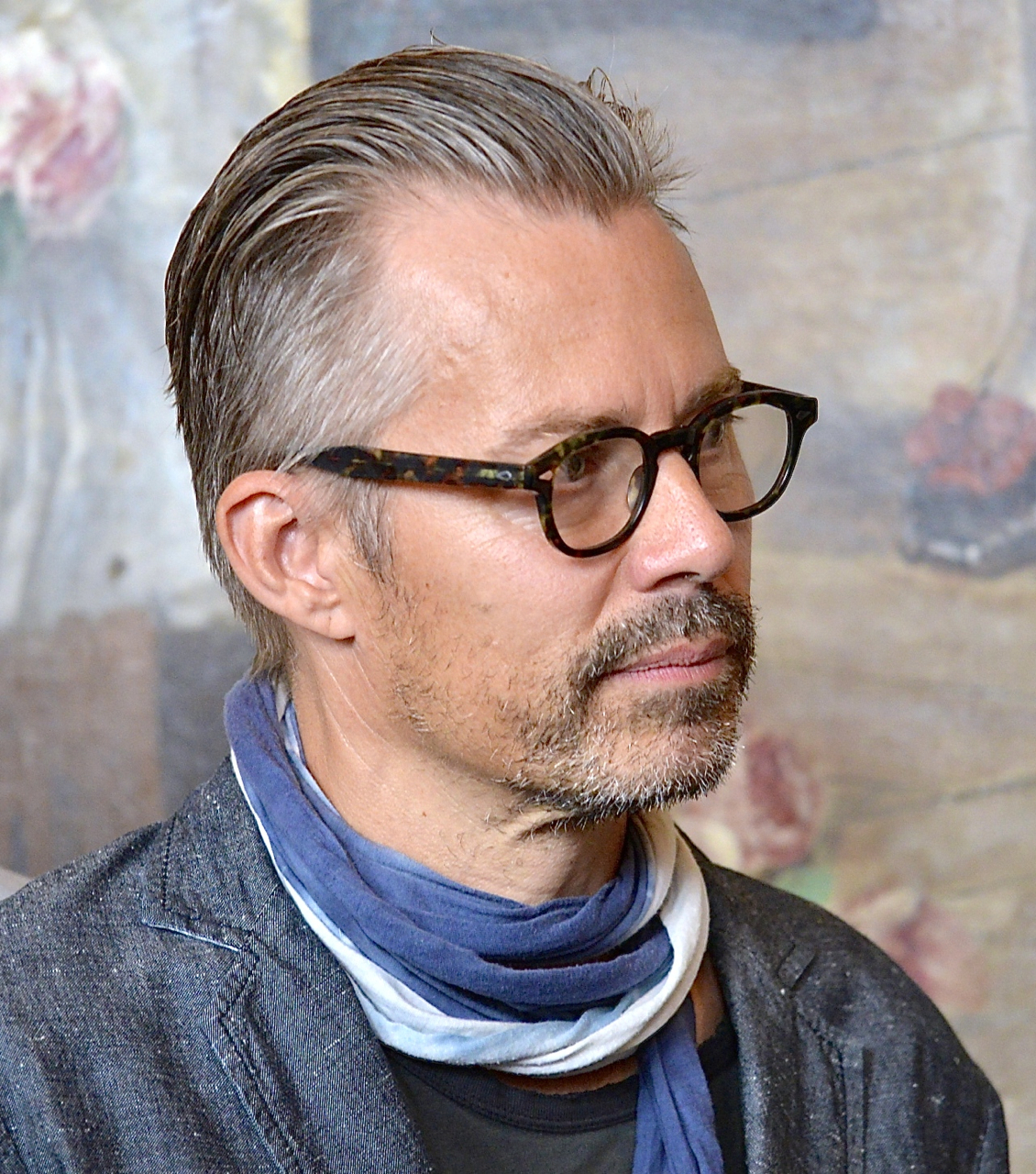
Peter Engman in 2014

Tony Peter Villiam Engman (born 24 September 1963 in Hallstavik, Norrtälje, Sweden) is a Swedish actor. He studied at Gothenburg Theatre Academy 1993–97.

== Selected filmography ==
- 2000 - The Mind's Eye (TV series)
- 2001 - Sprängaren
- 2001 - A Song For Martin
- 2002 - Suxxess
- 2002 - Stora teatern (TV)
- 2004 - Min f.d. familj (TV)
- 2005 - Van Veeteren – Moreno och tystnaden
- 2005 - Storm
- 2006 - Wallander – Luftslottet
- 2006 - When Darkness Falls
- 2010 - Hotell Gyllene Knorren (TV (Julkalendern))
- 2010 - Himlen är oskyldigt blå
