= Erik Haag =

Swedish television presenter (born 1967)

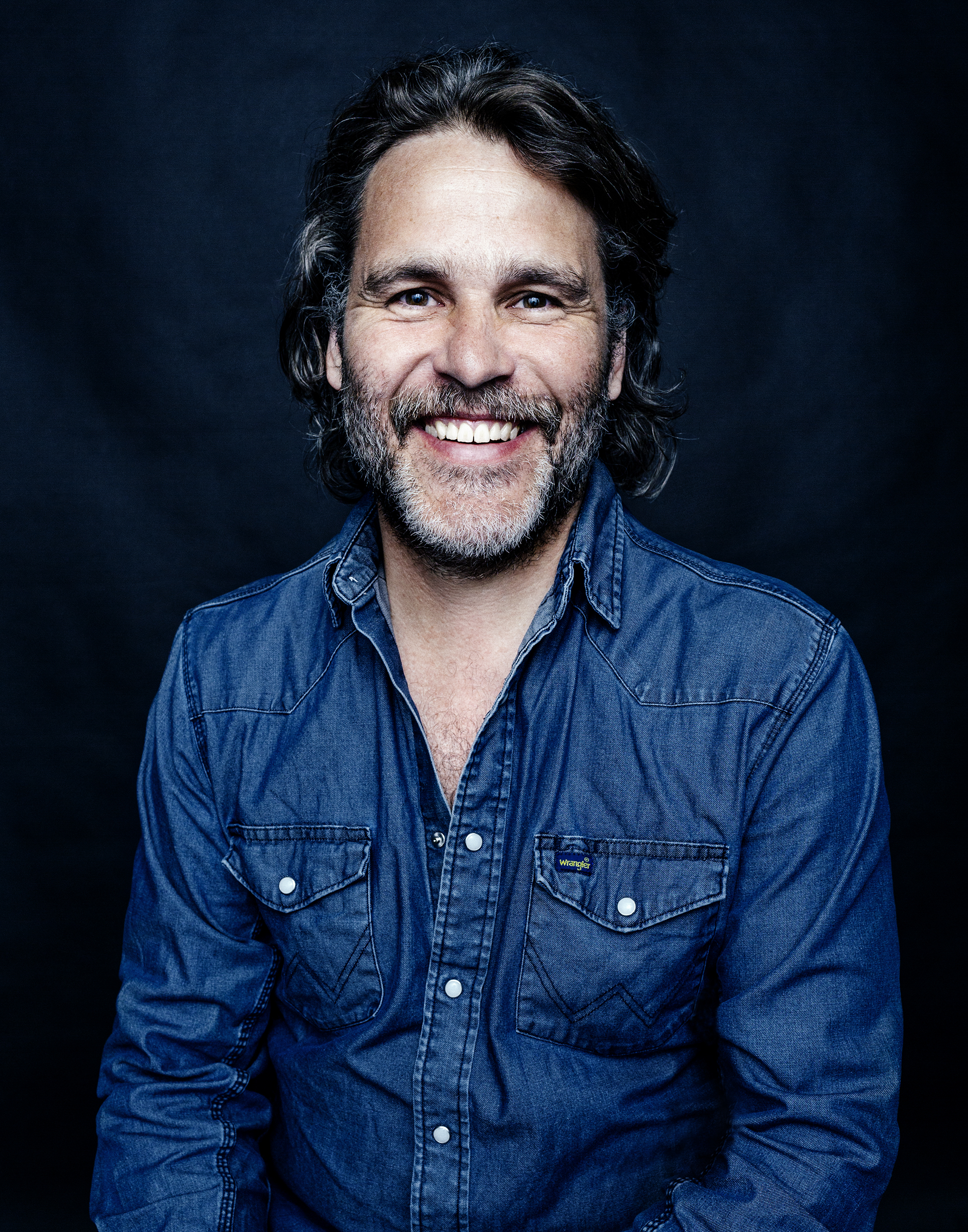
- Erik Haag in 2015
- Born: Erik Haag; 28 August 1967 (age 57); Stockholm, Sweden
- Occupation: Television presenter
- Partner: Lotta Lundgren

Erik Haag (born 28 August 1967) is a Swedish television presenter who hosted one of the semi-finals of Melodifestivalen 2005 and Historieätarna both on SVT. He presents Historieätarna along with Lotta Lundgren. He has been married to actress and author Martina Haag.

== Biography ==
Haag grew up on Kungsholmen in Stockholm and from 1980 in Riddarhyttan in Västmanland, before the family moved to Sorunda outside Nynäshamn in 1984.

Haag has primarily been active in radio and television. He was awarded the Alfons-Bokalen in 1995 for his contribution to this year's summer holiday program on SVT, where he was the host together with his sister Sara. He was part of the Hassan gang on Sveriges Radio in the 1990s and was the host of Knesset and Let's Go. Together with Henrik Schyffert, he was also the host of one of the semi-finals of the Melodifestivalen 2005. In the autumn of 2009, he led Roast at Berns on Kanal 5.

Erik Haag runs the production company Brommamamma together with Kerstin Johansson and Henrik Schyffert. Brommamamma is behind TV productions such as Sverige dansar och ler (Kanal 5), Sjön suger (Kanal 9), Sverige pussas och kramas (Kanal 5), I ditt ansikte (Kanal 5) and Raw Comedy (Kanal 5).

In 2010 and 2011, Haag participated in the program Landet brunsås on SVT. A feature in the program where Haag buys a guinea pig from Blocket to eat it was withdrawn by SVT. In the autumn/winter of 2012, the collaboration continued with Lotta Lundgren from Landet brunsås as host and co-creator of the historical food program series Historieätarna on SVT. On the same theme, but with a focus more on children, the same duo made the 2015 Christmas calendar program Tusen år till julafton for SVT. The SVT miniseries Bye bye Sverige about the Swedish emigration 1850–1910, is also made in the same style as Historieätarna and premieres on 7 December 2017.

In both 2011 and 2012, Erik and Martina Haag reached the final of the SVT program På spåret. In 2012, they won the final over the couple Jenny and Niklas Strömstedt. In 2012–13, team Haag participated in På spåret's champion season and went to the semi-finals. In 2020, Erik and Lotta Lundgren participated in Filip and Fredrik's Alla mot alla, where they won the final against Gry Forssell and Mikael Tornving. The team also won the season the following year by Alla mot alla.
