= Stefan Roos =

Swedish actor and screen writer (born 1970)

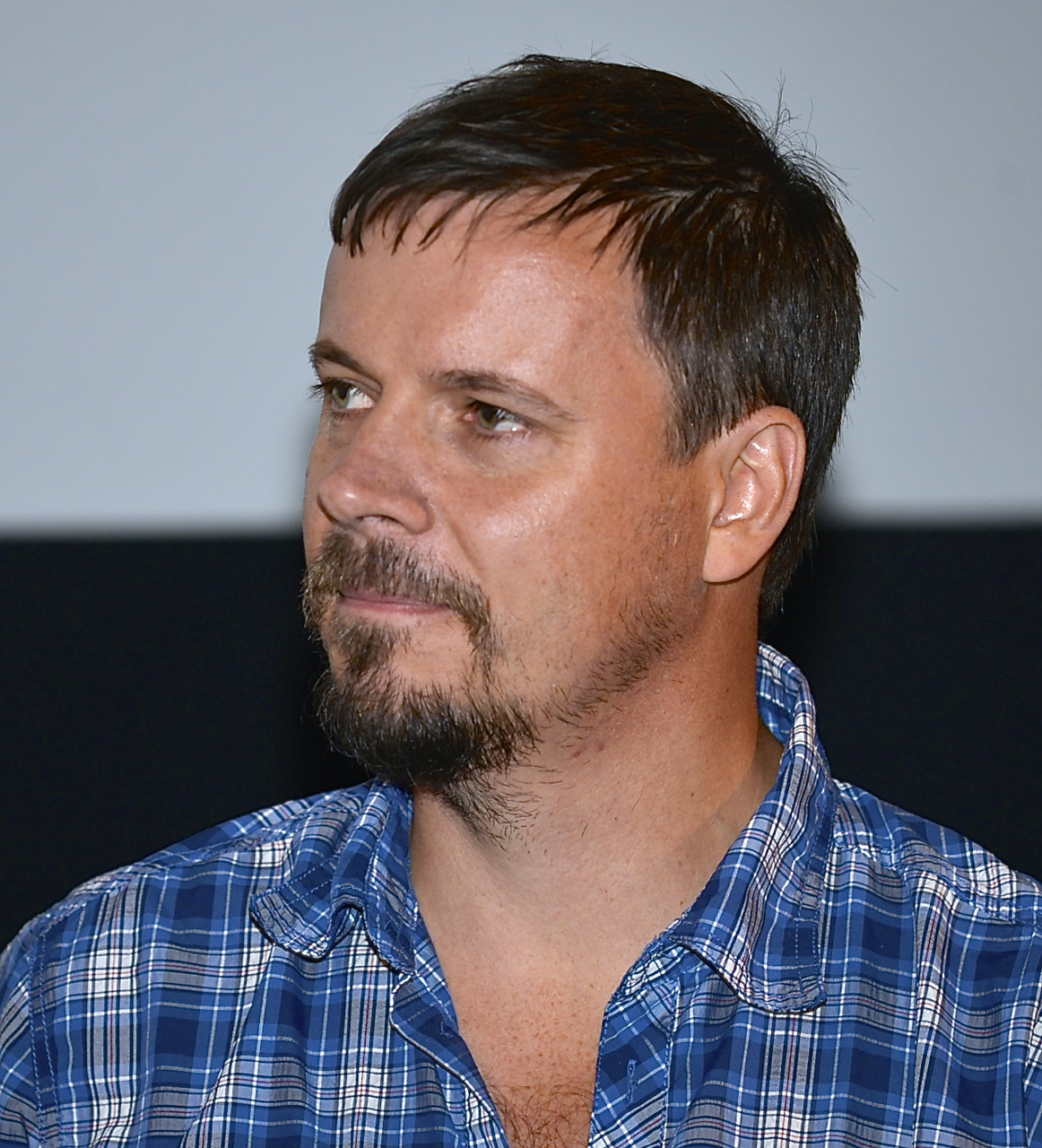
- Stefan Roos in Aug 2014
- Born: 3 February 1970 (age 56); Stockholm, Sweden
- Spouse: Elisabet Carlsson

Klas Stefan Roos (born 3 February 1970) is a Swedish actor and screen writer. Roos finished NAMA in Stockholm in 1993. He is married to the actress Elisabet Carlsson and together they have a daughter.

== Filmography ==
- 2007 - Mimmi och Mojje
- 2005 - Jonson och Pipen
- 2003 - Hem till Midgård
- 1997 - Beck – Lockpojken
- 1996 - Bröderna Fluff
