= Peter-No-Tail in Americat =

Peter-No-Tail in Americat (Pelle Svanslös i Amerikatt)
- Swedish cover.
- Directed by: Stig Lasseby; Jan Gissberg
- Written by: Story: Leif Krantz
- Production companies: Kratky Film Praha; Studio Bratri v Triku
- Release date: 14 December 1985 (Sweden)
- Running time: 78 min.
- Countries: Sweden; Czechoslovakia
- Language: Swedish

Peter-No-Tail in Americat (Swedish: Pelle Svanslös i Amerikatt) is a 1985 Swedish animated film based on stories about the tail-less cat Pelle Svanslös by Gösta Knutsson. The film is a sequel to the 1981 animated film Peter-No-Tail, and is known in Sweden for its extremely surreal content.

== Plot ==
Peter-No-Tail (Pelle Svanslös) is a cat without a tail, being bit off by a rat when he was a kitten. He compensates for this by studying hard, and much to the dismay of his arch-rival Magnus (Måns), he receives a high university degree that few cats in the university town of Uppsala, Sweden, have obtained. In the movie, he is visited by his American relative Pelle Swanson, who invites him to visit his new home country, the United States, in the movie called Americat. There everything is bigger; even the rats are much fatter.

The movie is mainly about what happens to someone from another country who is not used to the life in a big city. Nevertheless, Peter-No-Tail is still a kindhearted cat to everyone, even if the other cats are not nice to him. Everything seems possible in America, even the prospect of finally having a proper tail and a sweetheart to call one's own.

The movie has many surreal elements, as when Peter encounters large ghetto-rats that try to eat him, the famous church of Uppsala turning into a huge cat, and a Native American cat that uses magic to give him a long, golden tail, earning him the nickname of "Peter Gold-Tail."

== Cast ==
Character	Original	United Kingdom	United States
Peter No-Tail	Erik Lindgren	Susan Sheridan	Cam Clarke
Mans/Max	Ernst-Hugo Järegård	Jeff Harding	Bill Capizzi
Maja/Maya Silknose/Molly Creamnose	Ewa Fröling	Siân Rivers	Marbry Steward
Bull	Björn Gustafsson	Neill Conrich	Bill Capizzi
Bill	Carl Billquist	Jonathan Keeble	Robert Axelrod
Rat	Eddie Axberg	unknown	Tom Wyner
The gold from Arcadia	Lena-Pia Bernhardsson	unknown	unknown
Richard from Rickomberga	Nils Eklund	unknown	unknown
Laban from the Observatory Garden	Charlie Elvegård	unknown	unknown
Murre from Skogstibble	Åke Lagergren	unknown	unknown
Frida	Gunilla Norling	unknown	unknown
Lynxen/Old Bearcat	Jan Nygren	William Roberts	Mike Reynolds
Old Mayan	Agneta Prytz	unknown	unknown
Philadelphia Philly	Mille Schmidt	Stephen Lyons	Robert Axelrod
Peter Longtail	Stellan Skarsgård	Jeff Harding	Dan Woren
