= Peter-No-Tail (disambiguation) =

Peter-No-Tail or Pelle Svanslös is a Swedish children's book series and character created by Gösta Knutsson

Peter-No-Tail may also refer to:

- Peter-No-Tail (film), a 1981 film adaptation of the series
- Peter-No-Tail (TV series), a 1997 TV series based on the characters
