= Pelle Svanslös =

Fictional cat created by Gösta Knutsson

- Author: Gösta Knutsson
- Country: Sweden
- Language: Swedish
- Genre: Children's literature
- Published: 1939–1972
- Media type: Print (hardcover and paperback); Audiobook

Pelle Svanslös (English: Peter-No-Tail (film version) or Pelle No-Tail (book version)) is a fictional anthropomorphic cat created by the Swedish author Gösta Knutsson and a children's book series about him.

In 1937 Pelle Svanslös first appeared in a radio series, which was broadcast from a small studio in the university building in Uppsala.

A series of twelve children's books based on the character was published between 1939 and 1972. The first eleven books were illustrated by Lucie Lundberg. The books about Pelle are seen as a protest against the ever more overt support seen for Nazism in Sweden during the 1930s, and as such constitute a satire on contemporaneous society. The books have been translated to several European languages.

== Characters and story ==
The stories take place in Uppsala, Sweden. The characters of the books are cats; however, they are often based on real people. Knutsson studied at Uppsala University and was involved with the student societies Stockholms nation and Uppsala Student Union, and many of the characters are modelled on real-life people from this environment.

Pelle is a kindhearted and gullible cat who is constantly being tricked and bullied by Elaka Måns ("Mean Mike") and his dim-witted helpers Bill and Bull, who always echo Måns while slightly misunderstanding him, adding comic relief. However, good always prevails over evil, and Pelle even gets to experience true love together with Maja Gräddnos ("Maya Cream-nose"). In the first books Pelle is a house cat in the home of the children Olle and Birgitta, but as he grows he enters a relationship with cohabitant Maja in a basement peep-hole. After a while, the book series become more and more anthropomorphized, with less and less mention of the human world around Pelle.

Unlike the other cats in the series, Pelle has no tail (his name Svanslös "without a tail" reflects this). A large rat bit off Pelle's tail when he was only a few days old. Pelle was born in the countryside, but a family from Uppsala adopted him when he was a kitten. Some of the other cats bully Pelle because his embarrassing lack of a tail. In Mean Mike's eyes, Pelle is a bit of a snob and a weakling.

=== Book series ===
1. Pelle Svanslös på äventyr (1939); English: The adventures of Pelle No-Tail
2. Pelle Svanslös på nya äventyr (1940); English: Further adventures of Pelle No-Tail
3. Pelle Svanslös i Amerika (1941)
4. Pelle Svanslös Klarar sig (1942); English: Pelle No-Tail pulls through
5. Hur ska det gå för Pelle Svanslös? (1943)
6. Pelle Svanslös och Taxen Max (1944)
7. Pelle Svanslös i skolan (1945)
8. Heja Pelle Svanslös (1946)
9. Pelle Svanslös och Maja Gräddnos (1947)
10. Trillingarna Svanslös (1948)
11. Alla tiders Pelle Svanslös (1951)
12. Pelle Svanslös ger sig inte (1972)

== Adaptations ==
In 1949 the Royal Swedish Opera in Stockholm staged a Children's opera, Pelle Svanslös, with music by Erland von Koch. This production was subsequently presented each following year until 2001. In 1990 the stage production was filmed and shown by Sveriges Television. It featured Mark Bartholdsson as Pelle Svanslös, Iwa Sörenson as Maja Gräddnos and Magnus Lindén as elaka Måns.

The series has been adapted for film multiple times. In 1981 the feature animated film Peter-No-Tail was released, starring Mats Åhlfeldt as Peter and Ernst-Hugo Järegård as Elaka Måns. A sequel, Peter-No-Tail in Americat, followed in 1985, with much of the same cast but Erik Lindgren voicing Peter. In 1997, Sveriges Television produced the Nordic Christmas calendar live action TV series Peter-No-Tail with Björn Kjellman portraying Peter. This was followed in 2000 by the live action feature Peter-No-Tail and the Great Treasure Hunt. Picture books as well as two editions as a comics series have also been published; one comic magazine ran between 1965 and 1972.

A new 2D animated feature-length film musical was released by SF Studios in January 2020, with the art style largely based on the 1980s films.

== Eponymous asteroids ==
An asteroid that was discovered in March 1993 is eponymously named 8535 Pellesvanslös. Similarly the asteroids 8534 Knutsson, 8536 Måns, 8537 Billochbull, 8538 Gammelmaja and 8539 Laban were discovered at about the same time. 8534 was named after Gösta Knutsson and asteroids 8535-8539 after various characters in the series. They were all named by Swedish astronomer Claes-Ingvar Lagerkvist.

== See also ==
- Peter-No-Tail (1981 film)
- Peter-No-Tail in Americat
- Peter-No-Tail (1997 TV series)
- Peter-No-Tail and the Great Treasure Hunt
