= Stubby =

Stubby may refer to:

- Stubby (nickname), a list of people with the nickname
- Stubby Kaye, stage name of American comic actor born Bernard Katzin (1918-1997)
- Sergeant Stubby, a decorated war dog from World War I
- WGHR (college radio), an American radio station formerly called WSTB and nicknamed "Stubby"
- Stubby bottle, a short beer bottle
- Fimpen (UK title Stubby), a Swedish 1974 film directed by Bo Widerberg
- Stubby, a member of the Yule lads

Stubbies may refer to:

- Stubbies (brand), an Australian clothing brand, best known for their men's shorts
- Stubbies (surfing), a surf competition at Burleigh Heads, Queensland, from 1977 to 1988
