= Pillage of Sigtuna =

1187 raid in Sweden

Date	12 August 1187
Location	Sigtuna, Sweden
Result	Swedish defeat

Belligerents
Raiders	Kingdom of Sweden

Commanders and leaders
Unknown	Johannes †

The Pillage of Sigtuna was the raid of the Swedish town of Sigtuna by pagans from the Eastern Baltic in 1187, leading to its destruction. The pillage is most commonly attributed to Estonians, Curonians, Karelians, or Novgorodians. The pillage of Sigtuna became part of Estonian national discourse. The destruction of Sigtuna also received prominence in Sweden, due to belief of giving a rise to Stockholm as the new Swedish capital.

== Pillage ==
According to chronicles, the town of Sigtuna was burned down on 12 August 1187, and Archbishop Johannes of Uppsala was killed at Almarestäket. The killing of Jon Jarl in Asknäs has also been sometimes connected to the attack. Researchers mostly agree that the raid took place, but question the extent of damage and the identity of the attackers. Archeological records from Sigtuna provides no clear evidence of a major attack, no layer of burnt buildings or other evidence has been found.

== Identity of the raiders ==
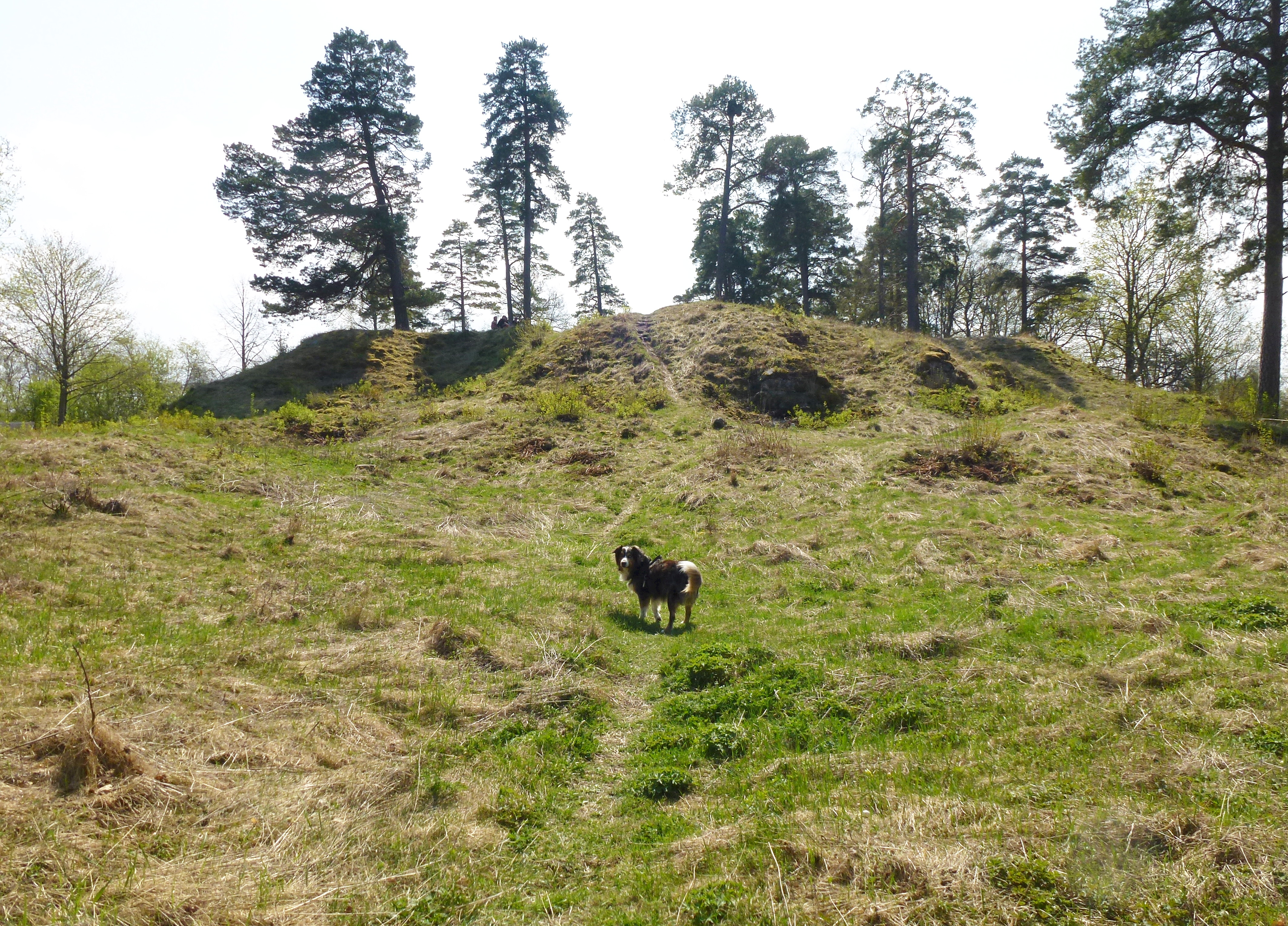
The ruins of Almarestäket bishop's castle abandoned in the 15th century, photographed in 2013.

The oldest sources mentioning the raid are the Annals of Visby, which describe the attackers simply as heathens.

The earliest source to identify the raiders is Erik's Chronicle from 1320s, which describes them as Karelians, but its reliability is not considered very high. Erik's Chronicle was written at the period of Swedish conflict with Russia (particularly Novgorod), which at the time included Karelia, so blaming the raid on them may have been a way to justify attacks in the 14th century. Karelians were not normally described as pirates in written sources, and historian Hain Rebas has questioned whether the ships they commonly used on the Lake Ladoga were even suited for sailing to Sigtuna. Additionally, there is no mention of the raid in Russian chronicles, which suggests that the identity of the attackers were not Karelians or Russians. Russian chronicles also do not tell of spectacular naval expeditions conducted by the Novgorodians; instead, there are mentions of merchants and princes visiting countries overseas.

In the 1540s, Olaus Petri wrote his Swedish Chronicle, making use of Erik's Chronicle and other sources which do not exist anymore, and he stated that Estonians burned down Sigtuna. Other 16th-century historians, including Laurentius Petri and Johannes Magnus, also attributed the attack to Estonians. Several researches regard this version more reliable, especially as Estonians definitely had ships and ability to sail to Sigtuna. For example, Livonian Chronicle of Henry mentions Estonian raid to Sweden in 1203, and states that such attacks were a common occurrence.

17th-century historian Johannes Messenius mentions the raid in his Scondia illustrata, blaming it in different parts of text once on Curonians and once on Estonians. Some researchers consider Curonian participation possible, as they actively engaged in piracy, and were known to cooperate with Estonians.

== Erik's Chronicle ==
According to Erik's Chronicle:

Sweden then suffered serious harm from the Karelians, causing great alarm. They sailed into Lake Mälar from the sea whether calm or stormy it might be, secretly within the Svealand isles in stealthily advancing files. Once their minds to the idea did turn that they the town of Sigtuna should burn, and so thoroughly they put it to the flame that it since then has never been the same. There Archbishop Jon was killed, a deed that many a heathen thrilled.

== Sigtuna doors ==
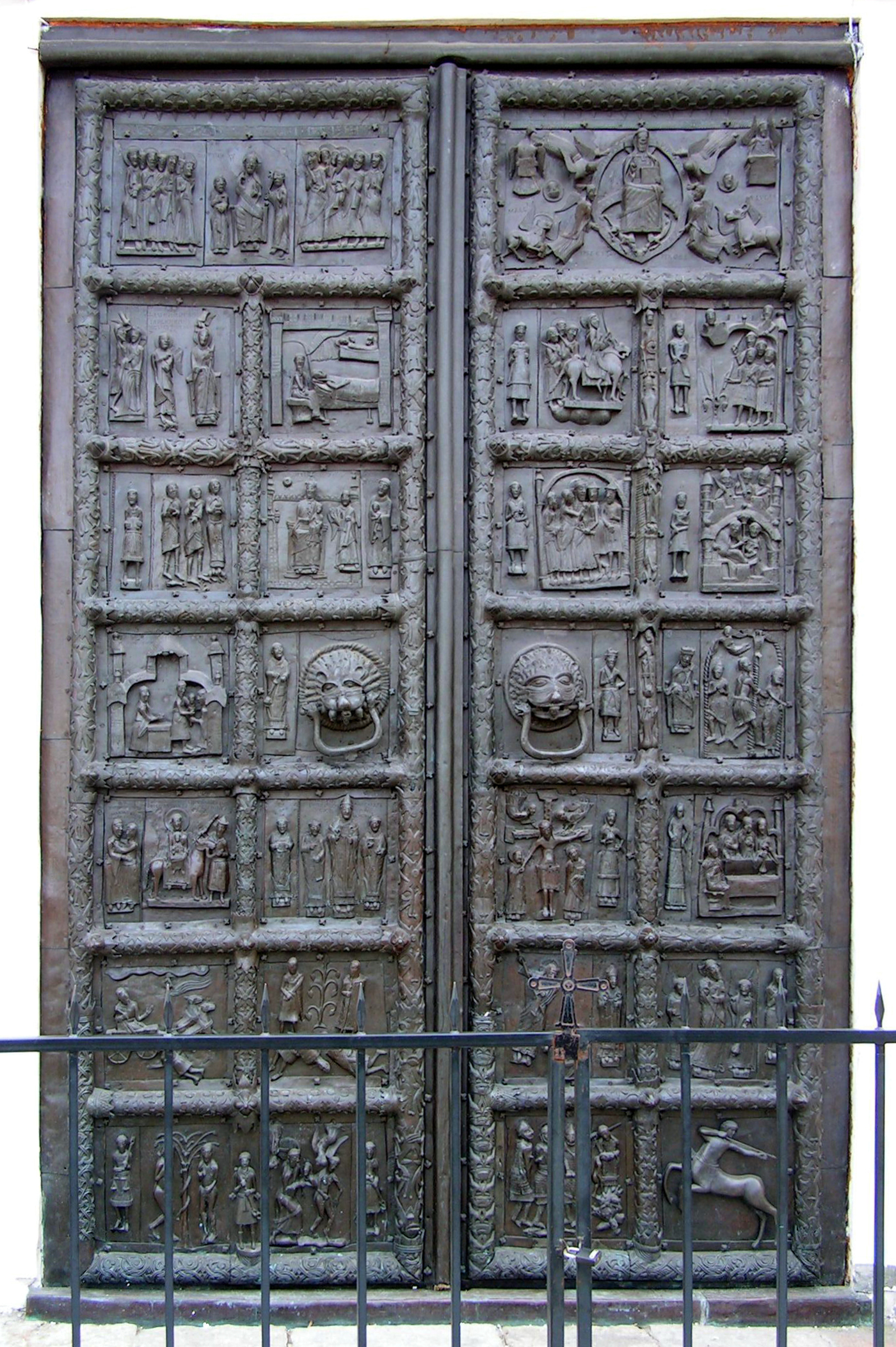
Magdeburg (Sigtuna) doors in Cathedral of Saint Sophia, Novgorod

The western portal of the Cathedral of Saint Sophia in Novgorod features two richly decorated 12th-century bronze doors, composed of 48 cast bronze plates mounted on two rectangular oak wings. These doors are considered exceptional examples of Romanesque art, with panels depicting biblical scenes such as the Baptism of Christ and the Adoration of the Magi.

According to a legend, the doors originated from the Sigtuna Cathedral and were taken as war booty during the 1187 raid, then brought to Novgorod. This legend emerged at the beginning of the 17th century and initially claimed that the invaders threw the doors and their keys into a lake near Sigtuna. Swedish scholar Martin Aschaneus, writing the history of Sigtuna in 1612, mentioned the doors being taken to Moscow and later identified them with those of the Saint Sophia in Novgorod. In Novgorod itself, the association of the cathedral doors with Sigtuna only appeared in the 18th century. The legend gained popularity through Olaf Dahlin's history of Sweden, which was translated into Russian in 1805. Russian historian Igor Shaskolsky considered this origin plausible, though some scholars regard the legend completely unreliable. An alternative theory suggests the doors were brought to Novgorod after the destruction of Dorpat (Tartu) in 1262.

Today, it is well established that the doors were produced in Magdeburg between 1152 and 1154, and were probably intended for Płock Cathedral, built in 1129–1144. The exact path by which the doors arrived in Novgorod remains unclear, though they may have been taken from Płock following an attack by Lithuanians and Old Prussians in 1262.

== See also ==
- Baltic Slavic piracy
- Baltic slave trade

== Bibliography ==
- Line, Philip (2007). Kingship and State Formation in Sweden: 1130 - 1290. BRILL. ISBN 978-90-04-15578-7.
- Carlquist, Erik; Hogg, Peter C.; Österberg, Eva (2011). The Chronicle of Duke Erik: A Verse Epic from Medieval Sweden. Nordic Academic Press. ISBN 9789185509577.
- Mägi, Marika (2018). In Austrvegr: The Role of the Eastern Baltic in Viking Age Communication across the Baltic Sea. BRILL. ISBN 9789004363816.
- Tarvel, Enn (2007). "Sigtuna hävitamine 1187. aastal" (PDF). Tuna (in Estonian) (2). ISSN 1406-4030.
- Žulkus, Vladas (2011). "Settlements and piracy on the eastern shore of the Baltic Sea: the Middle Ages to modern times" (PDF). Archaeologia Baltica. 16: 58–71. doi:10.15181/ab.v16i0.34. ISSN 1392-5520.
- Kuldkepp, Mart (2024). "The Story of Sigtuna's Destruction (1187) and Estonian Nationalism, 1868–1940". www.researchgate.net. De Gruyter.
