= Johan (archbishop of Uppsala, died 1187) =

Archbishop of Uppsala from 1185 to 1187

Johannes was the second Archbishop of Uppsala, Sweden, with a short-lived reign between 1185 and 1187.

== Biography ==
His name is sometimes spelled as 'Johan', the Swedish form of 'Johannes', but since the Swedish language had yet to be established it is of little importance. Little is known about Johannes. Only a few months after the death of the first Archbishop Stefan, Johannes was selected by the Pope to be his successor. He was ordained by the Archbishop of Lund, Absalon—the primate over the newly established Swedish archbishopric—by November 1185.

In 1187, a ship from the not yet christianed Estonia entered Mälaren, a lake close to Uppsala, on a plundering expedition. It sailed to Sigtuna, a prosperous city at that time, and plundered it. On its way back, barricades had been set up at Almarestäket, the only exit point and the place where Johannes was currently residing, to prevent the ship from escaping. The ship was however able to get around the barricades through a creek. There followed a battle; Johennes was killed during the pillage of Sigtuna by the pagan raiders (Estonians, Curonians, or Karelians).

== See also ==
- List of archbishops of Uppsala

== Sources ==
- Svea Rikes Ärkebiskopar, Uppsala, 1935
