= Peter-No-Tail and the Great Treasure Hunt =

Peter-No-Tail And The Great Treasure Hunt
- Theatrical release poster
- Directed by: Mikael Ekman
- Cinematography: Dan Myhrman
- Edited by: Hélène Berlin
- Music by: Mårten Ekman
- Production company: SVT Drama
- Distributed by: Buena Vista International
- Release date: 6 October 2000
- Running time: 93 minutes
- Country: Sweden
- Language: Swedish

Peter-No-Tail and the Great Treasure Hunt (Swedish: Pelle Svanslös och den stora skattjakten) is a 2000 Swedish live action film directed by Mikael Ekman.

== Cast ==
- Björn Kjellman-Pelle Svanslös
- Cecilia Ljung-Maja Gräddnos
- Christer Fant-Elaka Måns
- Leif Andrée-Bill
- Göran Thorell-Bull
- Suzanne Ernrup-Gullan Från Arkadien
- Brasse Brännström-Trisse
- Jonas Uddenmyr-Murre Från Skogtibble
- Lena-Pia Bernhardsson-Maja Gräddnos Mamma
- Peter Harryson-Pettersson
- Siw Malmkvist-Gammel-Maja I Domkrykotornet
- Lars Dejert-Tusse Batong
- Krister Henriksson-Berättarröster
- Anna Björk-Fröken Som Katten
