= Almarestäket's castle =

Building in Upplands-Bro Municipality, Stockholm County, Sweden

Coordinates: 59°28′10″N 17°47′33″E

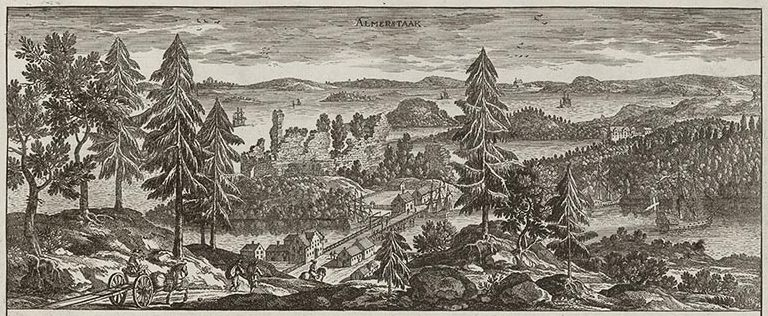
The castle ruin in Suecia Antiqua et Hodierna, 1690s.

Almarestäket's castle (or Sankt Erik's castle) is a medieval castle ruin in Upplands-Bro municipality in Stockholm County. The complex is named after Eric IX of Sweden and was once one of Sweden's strongest and most famous castles, located at the important choke point of Almarestäket, a strait at the inlet to Lake Mälaren. Almarestäket's castle is listed as an ancient monument by the Swedish National Heritage Board.

== History ==
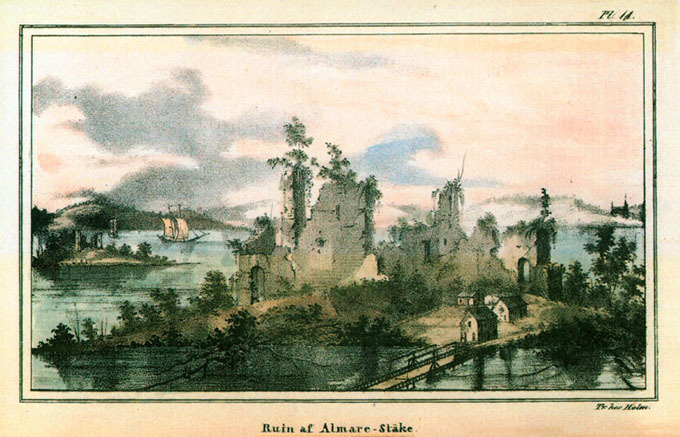
a 1636 sketch of the ruins

A castle was built during the 12th century on Stäketsholmen (which was then an island), and served as a defense facility for the cities of Sigtuna and Uppsala. An important waterway ran here between Stockholm and Uppsala, and whoever had control over the waterways also had control over the kingdom. Throughout the Middle Ages, there was a constant tug-of-war between the king and the church over the rule of the castle.

The castle was first mentioned at the end of the 14th century and is described in the Swedish rhyming chronicle, Karlskrönikan (1389–1524) as having been burned down on the night of 11 November 1434 by Eric Nipertz, on the orders of Erik of Pomerania and the eunuch of Stockholm Castle Hans Kröpelin. The reason was to prevent Engelbrekt Engelbrektsson's troops from capturing the castle. In 1440, Archbishop Nils Ragvaldsson received permission to build a new castle, which was completed about ten years later.

=== Demolition ===
During the domestic political strife of the 1510s, Bishop Gustav Trolle held the castle, which was besieged by his main opponent, Sten Sture the Younger in 1516–17. In 1517, despite the threat of excommunication, Sten Sture enforced a decision of the Riksdag that the castle should be demolished. The demolition was carried out in 1519, as records indicate that the brick had been transported from Almarestäket to Stockholm to be reused. The event was the prelude to the Stockholm Bloodbath in 1520.

== Ruin today ==
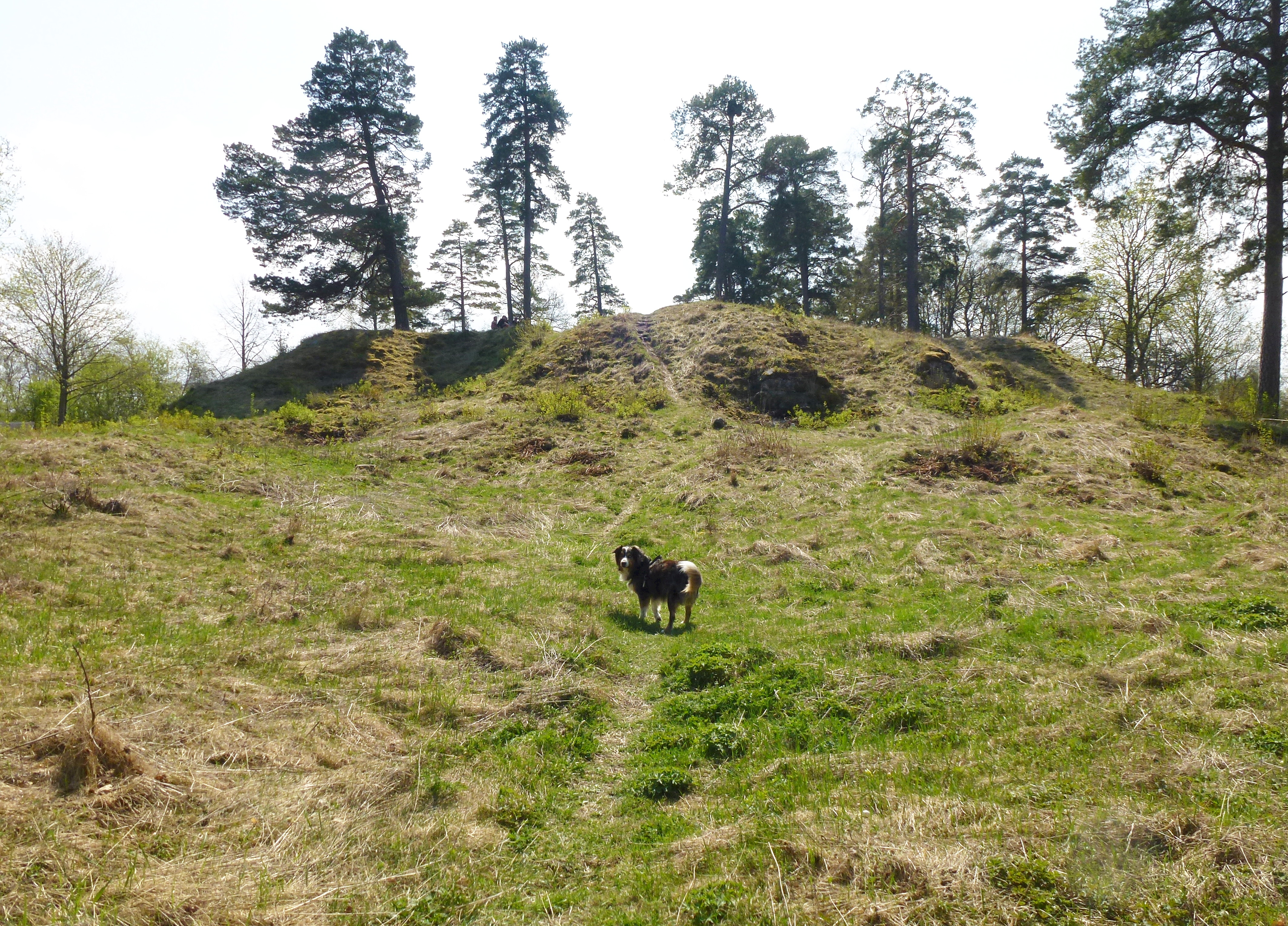
The ruins photographed in 2013

The castle ruin stands on an easily accessible plateau-like hill with an area of 125 × 80 meters and a height of 3–4 meters. In the northwestern part, traces of foundations and house foundations are visible, with pits filled with gray stone and occasional bricks. On the western slope, there is a string of blocks that could possibly originate from a collapsed wall. From the ruin hill, there is a wide view over Görväln and Almarestäket. Below the hill is an approximately five-meter high obelisk in red granite that was built in 1804, as well as the remains of the adjacent bridge over the Almarestäket.

== Gallery ==
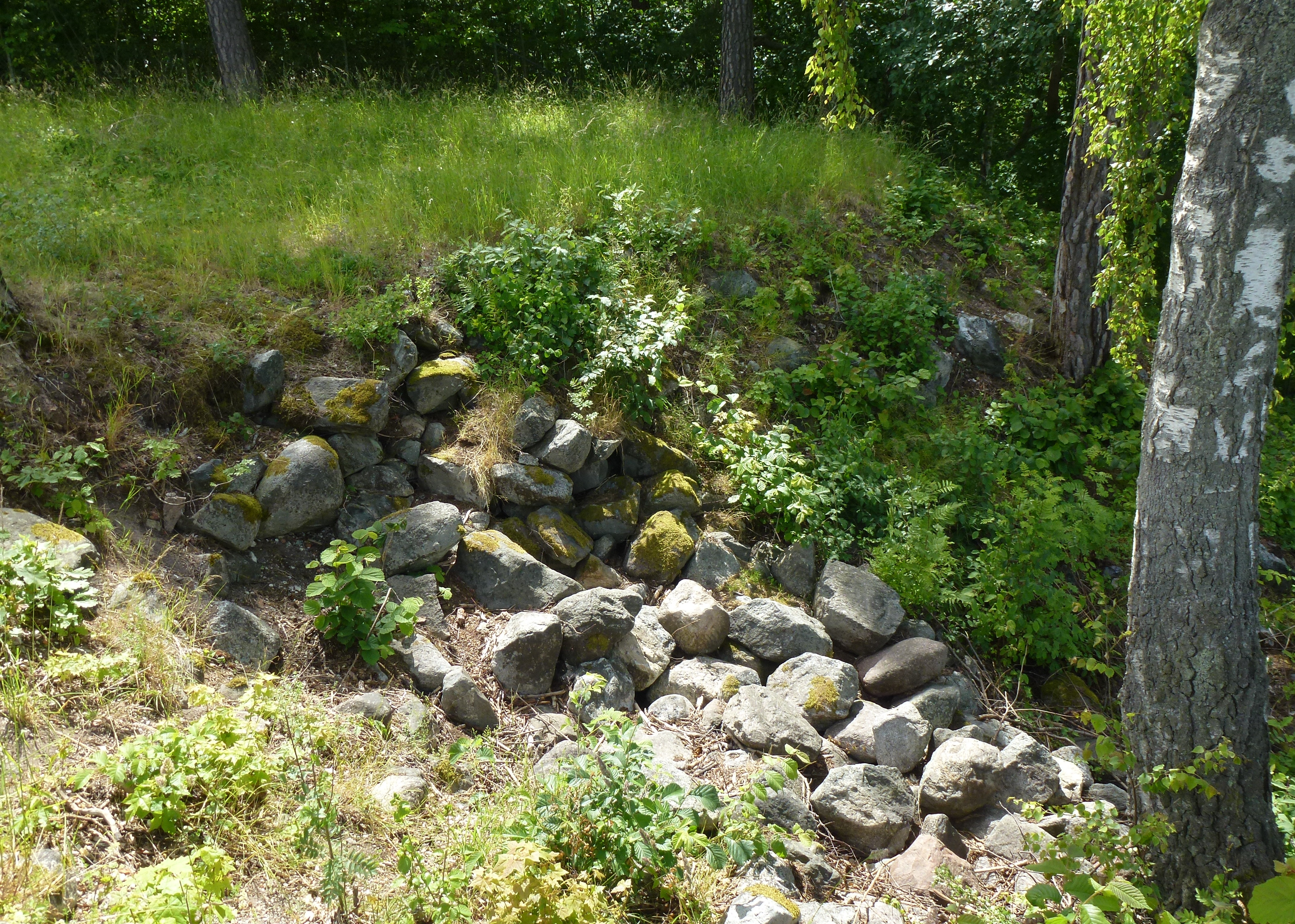

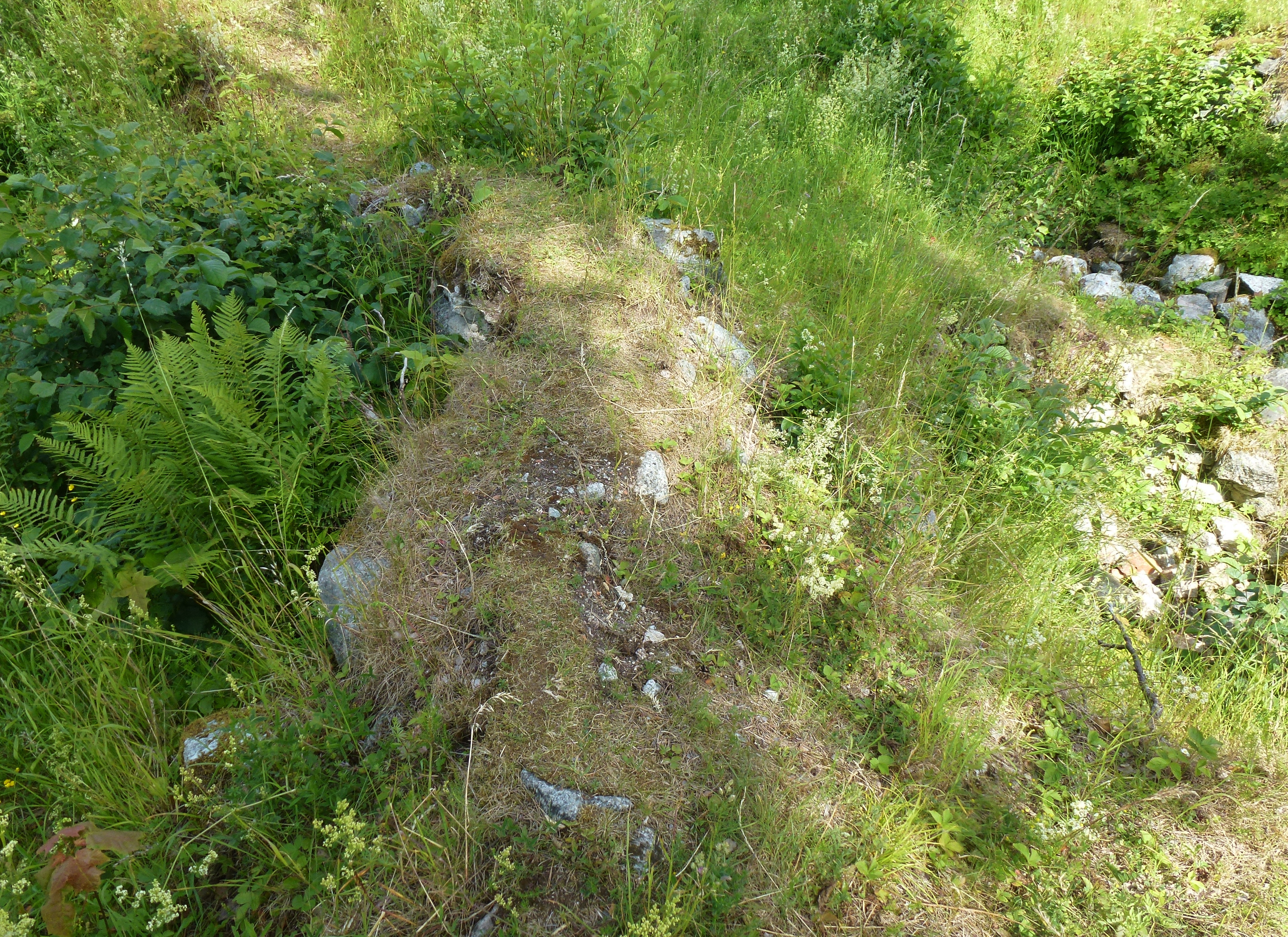

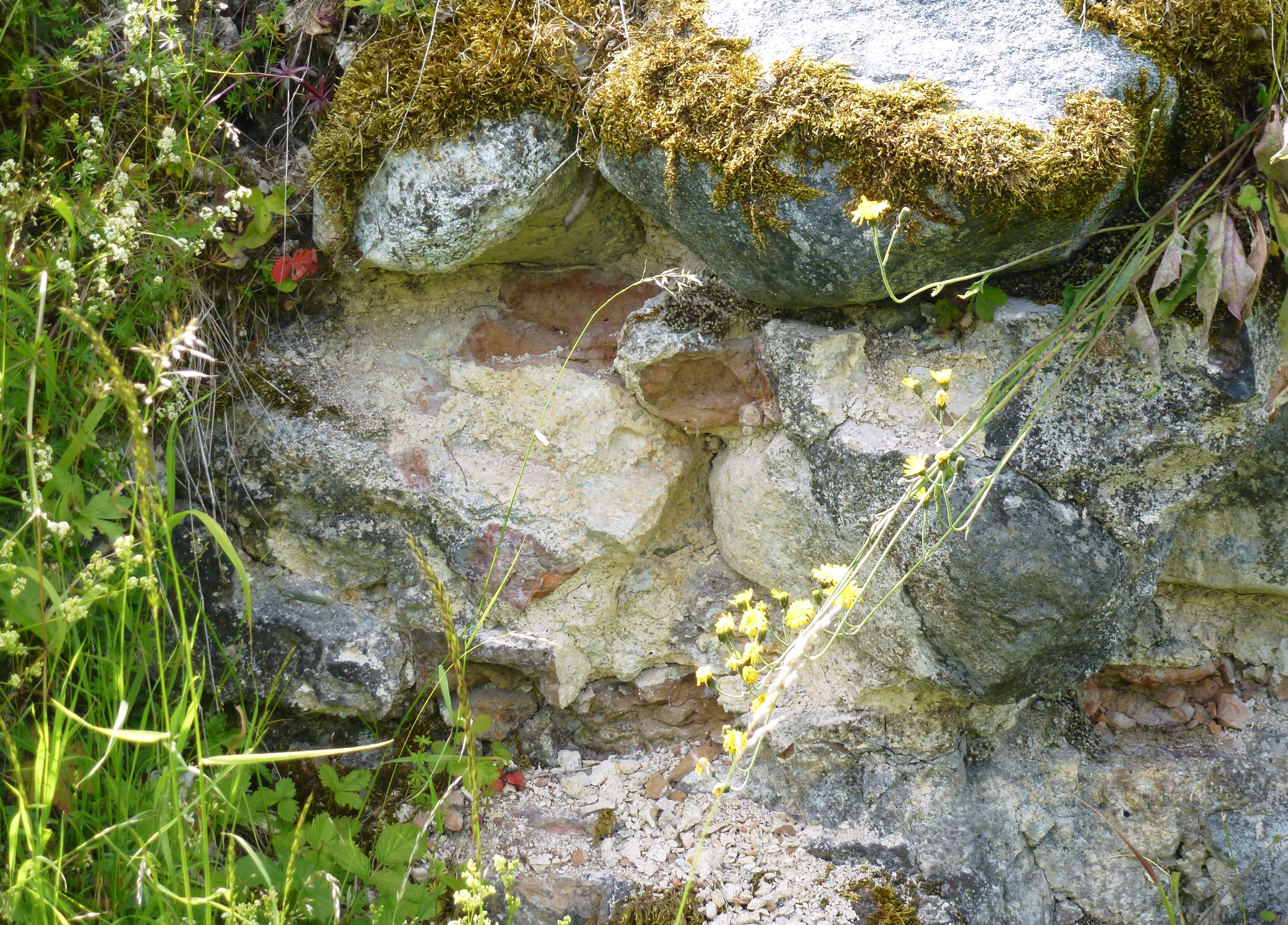

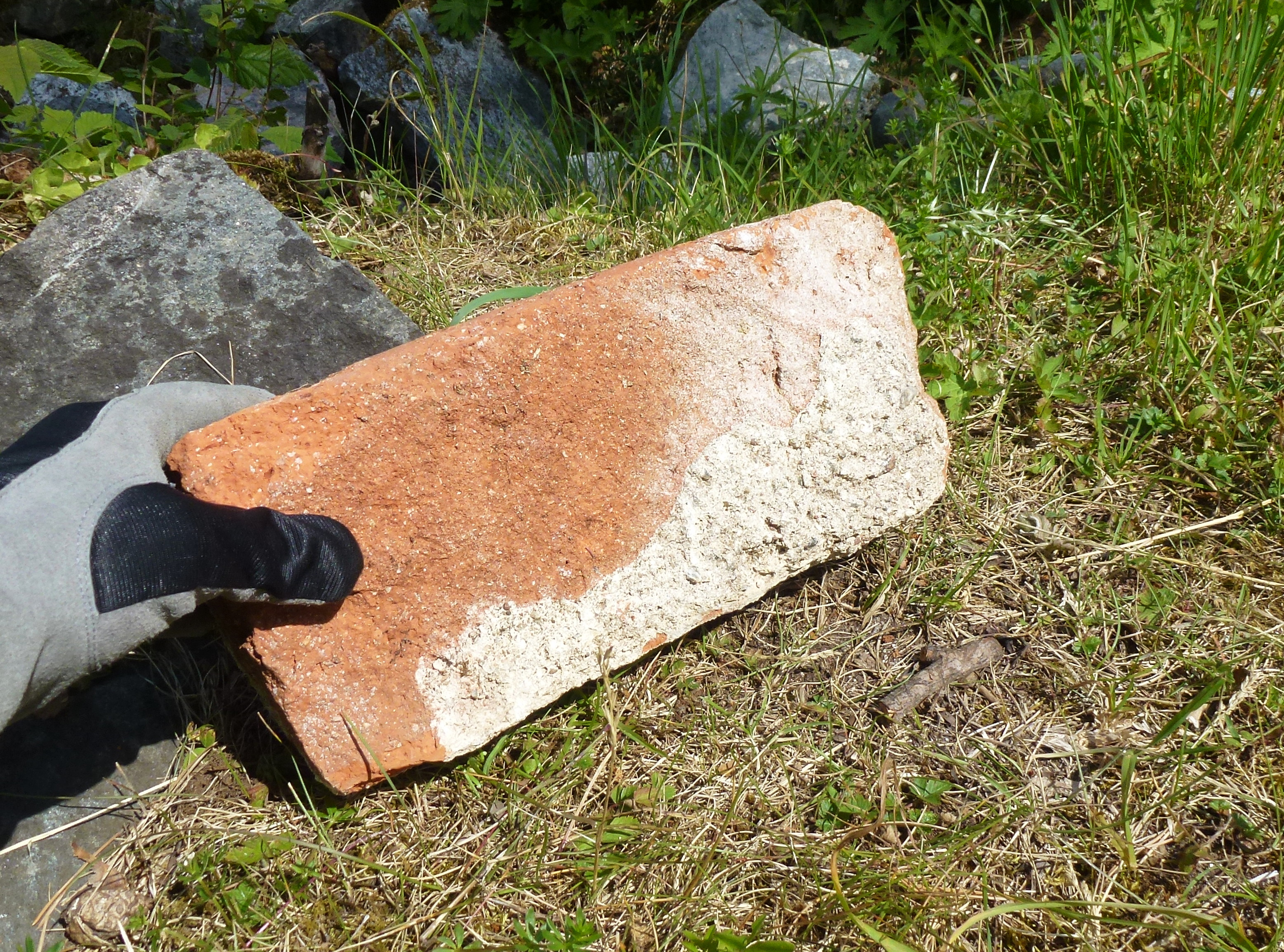
