= Rooftree =

- Poster
- Directed by: Jörn Donner
- Screenplay by: Jörn Donner
- Based on: Tvärbalk by Sivar Arnér
- Starring: Ulf Palme, Harriet Andersson, Gunnel Broström, Ernst-Hugo Järegård
- Cinematography: Rune Ericson
- Edited by: Jörn Donner, Per Krafft
- Release date: 10 April 1967
- Running time: 88 minutes
- Country: Sweden
- Language: Swedish

Rooftree (Swedish: Tvärbalk) is a 1967 Swedish drama film directed by Jörn Donner. It is based on Sivar Arnér's 1963 novel Tvärbalk.

== Cast ==
- Ulf Palme as Leo Wittö
- Harriet Andersson as Noomi Moldovan
- Gunnel Broström as Inez Wittö
- Ernst-Hugo Järegård as Magnus
- Brita Öberg as Leo's Mother
- Lars Göran Carlson as Dr. Liljefors (uncredited)
- Nils Eklund as Dr. Axing (uncredited)
- Barbro Nordin as Jörel (uncredited)
- Eva Stiberg as Nurse Greta (uncredited)
