= Lars Göran Carlson =

Swedish actor

Lars Göran Carlsson
- Born: 30 August 1936 (age 90); Gothenburg, Sweden
- Occupations: Actor; film director
- Years active: 1962–2011

Lars Göran Carlson (born 30 August 1936 in Gothenburg) is a Swedish actor and film director.

== Selected filmography ==
- 1962 - Raggargänget
- 1964 - Vi på Saltkråkan (TV)
- 1966 - Heja Roland!
- 1967 - Rooftree
- 1971 - Den byxlöse äventyraren (director)
- 1979 - Father to Be
- 1981 - Tuppen
- 1989 - Förhöret
- 2001 - Sprängaren
