= Almarestäket =

Strait in Sweden

Coordinates: 59°28′6″N 17°46′55″E

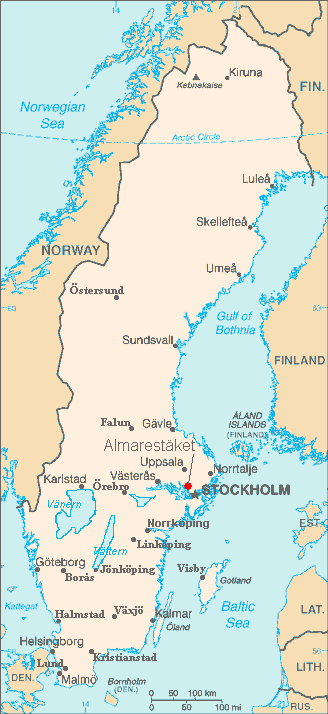

Almarestäket, or Stäket, is a strait at the inlet of Lake Mälaren in central-eastern Sweden. A fortress existed there between about 1370 and 1517.

A place mentioned as Stocksund by Old Norse author Snorre Sturlasson was once believed to be located here, but is now believed to have been located in Norrström, 2 km (1.2 mi) to the west.

The strait was of importance before Stockholm was founded in the 14th century, as it guarded the waterway to the significant Swedish medieval cities Uppsala and Sigtuna. For instance, an attack on Sigtuna by Baltic Vikings in 1187 led to a battle at Almarestäket, resulting in the death of Archbishop Johannes.

== Fortress ==
There was a fortress built here in the mid-late 14th century, under the reign of Albert of Sweden. It was located on the small island Stäkesön in the middle of the strait. It became the residence of the Swedish Archbishop until 1517, when the Archbishop Gustav Trolle locked himself in there to avoid trial, and the Swedish government demanded and carried out the demolition of the fortress. The procedure was formally unauthorized because at the time State property was to be separate from Church property. As a revenge for this and other perceived injustices, Trolle, assisted by the Kalmar Union King Christian II, took revenge in the Stockholm Bloodbath of 1520.

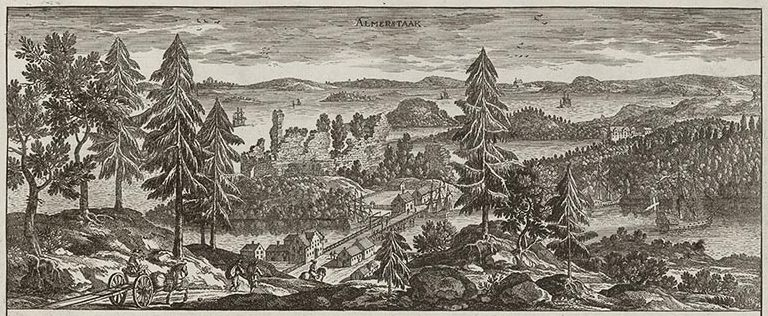
Almarestäket circa 1700, in Suecia antiqua et hodierna.

== Trench ==
There was a trench dug near Almarestäket in the 17th or early 18th century, as a defence structure. Most of it was filled up in 1875 when the main line railroad (Västra Stambanan) was built in Sweden. The area was again built upon in the 1970s, when a highway was constructed.
