= Pelle Svanslös (TV series) =

- Genre: Christmas calendar
- Created by: Gösta Knutsson
- Written by: Pernilla Oljelund
- Starring: Björn Kjellman; Cecilia Ljung; Christer Fant; Brasse Brännström
- Narrated by: Gösta Prüzelius
- Country of origin: Sweden
- Original language: Swedish
- No. of episodes: 24

Original release
- Release: 1 December – 24 December 1997

Related
- Mysteriet på Greveholm (1996); När karusellerna sover (1998)

Pelle Svanslös is a 1997 Swedish live-action SVT's Christmas calendar TV series initiated by SVT Dramas executive chief Mark Levengood. The series is based on Gösta Knutsson's books about Pelle Svanslös and was well received by both children and grownups. The script was written by Pernilla Oljelund.

Some of the actors wore mechanical, remote-controlled tails with their costumes.

== Plot ==
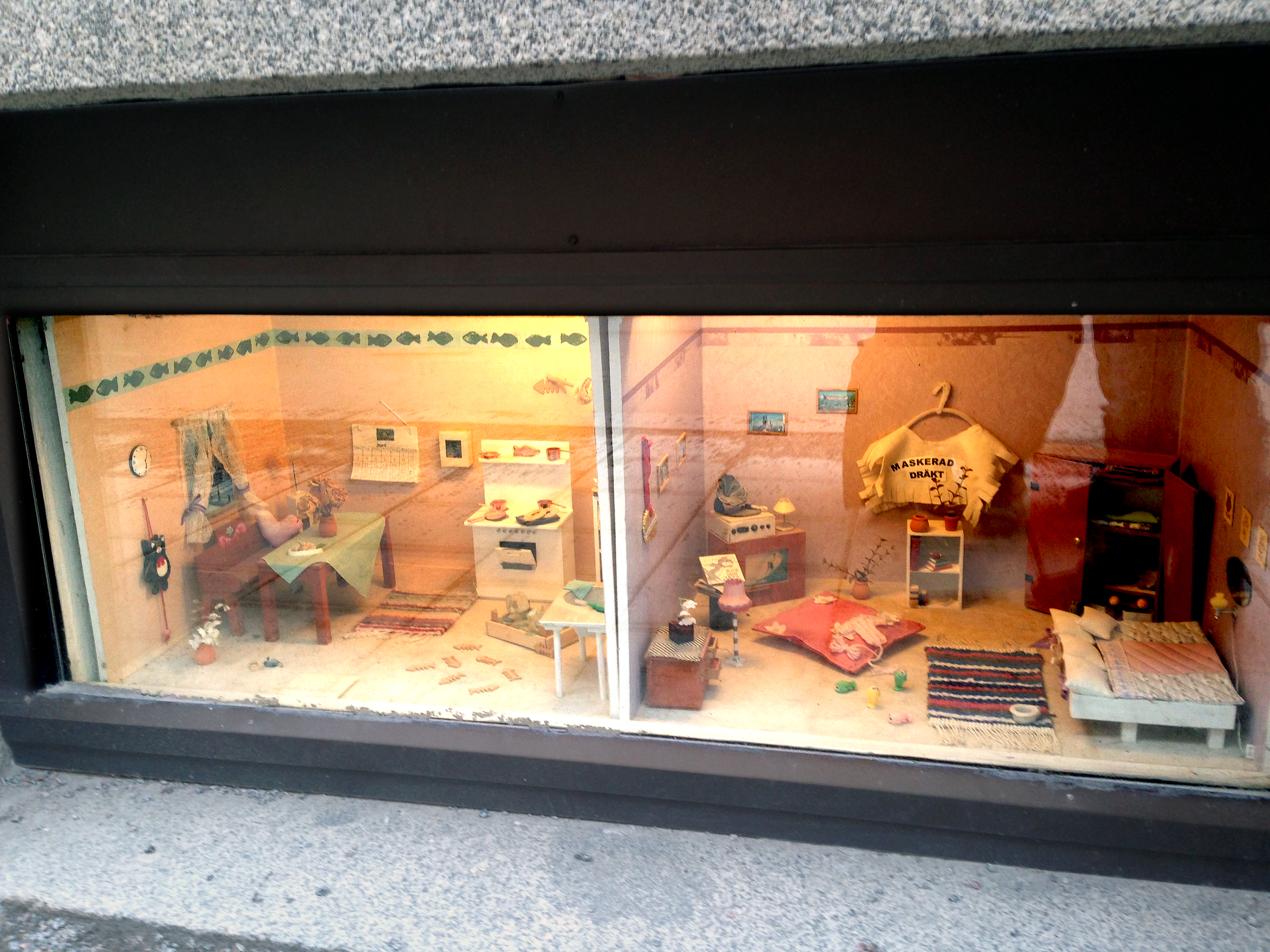
Pelle Svanslös glugg at Åsgränd in Uppsala.

The series is set at Åsgränd in the town of Uppsala in Sweden, where a group of cats are living. Among them are Pelle Svanslös, Måns and Maja Gräddnos.

== Actors ==
- Björn Kjellman - Pelle Svanslös
- Cecilia Ljung - Maja Gräddnos
- Christer Fant - Måns
- Leif Andrée - Bill
- Göran Thorell - Bull
- Brasse Brännström - Trisse
- Suzanne Ernrup - Gullan från Arkadien
- Jonas Uddenmyr - Murre från Skogstibble
- Lena-Pia Bernhardsson - Maja Gräddnos mamma
- Anna Norberg - Frida
- Lakke Magnusson - Fritz
- Jonathan Dehnisch - Fridolf
- Julia Dehnisch - Fridolfina
- Peter Harryson - Pettersson
- Ulla Akselson - Gammel-Maja
- Björn Granath - Konrad
- Lars Dejert - Tusse Batong
- Claes Månsson - Karl-Erik, kalkonen
- Henry Bronett - Taxen Max
- Reuben Sallmander - Frösö-Frasse
- Ecke Olsson - Ville med sillen
- Katarina Ewerlöf - Mirjam, societetskatt
- Fransesca Quartey - Monique, societetskatt
- Anders Beckman - Långe John
- Gösta Prüzelius - Berättaren

== Video ==
The series was released on VHS in 1998, and on DVD on 19 November 2001.
