= Sigtuna IF =

Association football club in Sigtuna, Sweden

- Full name: Sigtuna IF Alliansförening
- Founded: 1919
- Website: https://www.sigtunaif.se/

Sigtuna IF is a sports club located in Sigtuna on the outskirts of Stockholm, Sweden. Sigtuna, mostly known for being the oldest town in Sweden, is also known for sports.

The club was founded in 1919, and has a floorball team as well as football and table tennis.

== See also ==
- Football in Sweden
- List of football clubs in Sweden
