= Stig Lasseby =

Swedish animator, director and producer

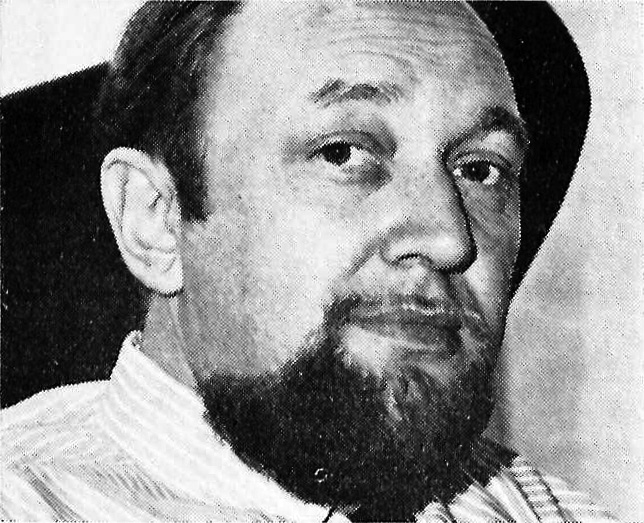
Stig Lasseby, circa 1965.

Stig Gunnar Lasseby (5 March 1925 – 8 December 1996) was a Swedish animator, director and producer. Through his company Team Film he played an important role in the history of Swedish animation.

Lasseby was born in Gällivare and was educated as a teacher of drawing. In 1955, with two classmates, he founded the animation studio AB Team Film, which by 1966 made him one of Sweden's best known animators. In 1972 the company produced Agaton Sax och bröderna Max, a television series based on the book of the same name by Nils-Olof Franzén, one of the series about the detective Agaton Sax. In 1976 they produced a series of three short films for television about Agaton Sax, and also Agaton Sax and the Byköpings Village Festival, the first full-length entirely animated Swedish film, co-produced by the Swedish Film Institute.

Team Film went on to produce two further full-length animated features, Peter-No-Tail (1981), which was a critical and popular success and was also released in several other countries, and Peter-No-Tail in Americat (1985), which had faster action and for which some of the animation and coloring was outsourced to Prague; it made less money and received a mixed critical reception.

Team Film also produced a series for small children, Totte (1973), based on books by Gunilla Wolde, and three shorts based on other children's books, Kattresan (1982), Sjörövarfilmen (1983), and Musikbussen (1994), the first two again sponsored by the Swedish Film Institute.

Lasseby also voiced Tänkande August, the computer, in the Agaton Sax films and TV series.

Lasseby created an animation school in Eksjö; in 1996 this became the first college-level animation training program in Sweden.

He died in 1996 in Hult.

== Selected filmography ==
- 1971 – Fido går till plugget (director, producer)
- 1972 – Agaton Sax and the Max Brothers (director, producer)
- 1976 - Agaton Sax and the Byköpings Village Festival (director, producer)
- 1976 – Agaton Sax (director, producer)
- 1981 - Peter-No-Tail (director)
- 1982 - Kattresan (producer)
- 1983 – Sjörövarfilmen (producer)
- 1985 - Peter-No-Tail in Americat (director)
- 1994 – Musikbussen (director)
