= Peter-No-Tail (film) =

Peter-No-Tail (original title:Swedish: Pelle Svanslös)
- Original Swedish film poster
- Directed by: Stig Lasseby; Jan Gissberg
- Screenplay by: Leif Krantz
- Based on: Pelle Svanslös by Gösta Knutsson
- Produced by: Stig Lasseby
- Starring: Mats Åhlfeldt; Ewa Fröling; Ernst-Hugo Järegård; Björn Gustafson; Wallis Grahn; Eddie Axberg
- Cinematography: Eberhard Fehmers
- Music by: Berndt Egerbladh
- Production companies: Sandrews; Svenska Filminstitutet; Teamfilm AS; Treklövern
- Distributed by: Sandrew
- Release date: 25 December 1981 (Sweden)
- Running time: 81 minutes
- Country: Sweden
- Language: Swedish

Peter-No-Tail (Swedish: Pelle Svanslös) is a 1981 Swedish animated film based on the children's book series by Gösta Knutsson.

== Plot ==
On a Swedish country farm, a cat gives birth to a litter of kittens, one of which does not have a tail. The kindly farmer is ordered by the farm's cruel owner to get rid of the tail-less kitten, so he smuggles the young cat into the car of a family returning to Uppsala after their summer holiday near the farm. Discovered on arrival at the family's home, the stowaway is named Peter-No-Tail (Pelle Svanslös) by the children Olle and Birgitta.

Peter soon settles into his new home, but when Birgitta takes him out for a walk in the following spring, he is chased by a vicious bulldog, and escapes to a town alley where Elaka Måns (Mean Mike) lives. The long-tailed Måns, aided by twins Bill and Bull, is a notorious bully amongst the town cats, so he tricks the naïve Peter into singing outside the home of a young female cat named Maja Gräddnos (Molly Cream-Nose). Maja's human owners hate cat howling, so Måns expects Peter to be soaked with water in his attempt to impress Maja. But Maja is attracted to the polite and kind-hearted Peter, so she invites him in to share some fish with her; thus it is Måns who ends up getting soaked with a garden hose when he tries to impress Maja himself.

At the town cats' spring ball, Måns organises a competition where contestants must answer a mental arithmetic question by showing the winning number with their tails. Peter is given an impossibly hard sum, and the other cats mock him for not having a tail at all to even guess the answer. But a snake that Peter befriended earlier reveals the correct answer, and also bites Måns' long tail, humiliating him in front of the crowd. In revenge, Måns breaks into Peter's home and frames him for eating Olle's birthday cake, so the family locks Peter in the ironing room as punishment. However, when a fire breaks out in the house at night, Peter wakes and alerts the sleeping family with his frantic meowing, so he is redeemed as a hero, and Birgitta gives him a medal for his bravery.

When Måns learns of Peter's good deed, he dismisses his medal as worthless, and invents a new sports event called the Cat Championship, where the winning prize is a gold medallion. The challenges include a distance jump, throwing shotput balls, and a hurdle race course. Måns stages each of the challenges so that Peter fails - his spike shoes for the distance jump have the spikes on the inside to hurt his feet, Peter's shotput ball is far heavier than the others, and Måns cheats in the hurdle race to make sure he wins. But when Måns' tricks are discovered, the referee disqualifies him and awards Peter the gold medallion instead. Maja, who has been cheering Peter on throughout the tournament, congratulates him and they celebrate his victory together.

Now eager to get rid of Peter, Måns tries to rally his fellow cats into opposing 'country' cats, and he sets loose the dangerous bulldog to chase Peter out of the city. Most of the town cats watch from safety in the trees, but a kitten named Fridolf has strayed onto some high scaffolding platforms, where he is attacked by the bulldog. Peter rescues Fridolf from the collapsing scaffolding and escapes from the savage bulldog, who subsequently chases Måns, Bill and Bull away instead. For saving Fridolf, the town cats praise Peter and finally accept him into their community. At the end of the film, Peter's family take him with them on their next summer holiday, returning to the farm where Peter was born.

== Origins ==
The film is animated and is based on the children's book series by Gösta Knutsson. Class discrimination, bullying and racism play a big part of the story, much like in the books, since Peter is at times looked down on for being a "country cat", who is accused by Måns of threatening the livelihoods of the town cats. In the original Swedish dub Måns is played by Ernst-Hugo Järegård.

== Cast ==
| Character | Original | United Kingdom | United States |
|---|---|---|---|
| Pelle Svanslös/Peter-No-Tail | Mats Åhlfeldt | Steven Pacey | Ken Berry |
| Maja Gräddnos/Molly Silknose/Molly Creamnose | Ewa Fröling | Helen Worth | Tina Louise |
| Elaka Måns/Mean Mike/Max | Ernst-Hugo Järegård | Peter Woodthorpe | Larry Storch |
| Bill | Carl Billquist | Gareth Armstrong | Richard Kline |
| Bull | Björn Gustafson | George Little | Dom DeLuise |
| Gammel-Maja/Old Mayan | Wallis Grahn | Unknown | Unknown |
| Gullan från Arkadien/The gold from Arcadia | Lena-Pia Bernhardsson | Unknown | Unknown |
| Laban från Observatorielunden/Laban from the Observatory Garden | Charlie Elvegård | Unknown | Unknown |
| En råtta/A rat | Charlie Elvegård | Unknown | John Hostetter |
| Murre från Skogstibble/Murre from Skogstibble/Monty from the Dump District | Åke Lagergren | Unknown | Unknown |
| Kalle Huggorm/Kalle Viper/Lester the Friendly Viper | Åke Lagergren | Unknown | Jan Rabson |
| Rickard från Rickomberga/Richard from Rickomberga/Ernest | Nils Eklund | Unknown | John Hostetter |
| Fritz | Jan Sjödin | Unknown | Robert Axelrod |
| Frida | Gunilla Norling | Unknown | Unknown |
| Den tjocka råttan/The fat rat | Eddie Axberg | Unknown | John Hostetter |
| Kråkan/The crow | Gunnar Ernblad | Unknown | Jan Rabson |
| Birgitta/Brenda | Kajsa Bratt | Unknown | Maureen O'Connell |
| Olle/Ollie | Niklas Rygert | Unknown | Unknown |
| Momma/Mother | Helena Brodin | Unknown | June Lockhart |
| Pappa/Father | Axel Düberg | Unknown | William Schallert |
| Ladugårdsförmannen/The barn foreman | Sture Hofstadius | George Roubicek | John Hostetter |

=== Additional English voices ===
- United Kingdom: Douglas Blackwell (Farm Owner, Molly's Owners)
- United States: John Hostetter (Truck Drivers, Cats, Cat Calloway and His Sexy Songbirds, Firefighter, Bob), Jan Rabson (Farm Owner, Cats)

== Sequel ==
A sequel called Peter-No-Tail in Americat (Swedish: Pelle Svanslös i Amerikatt) was released in 1985.
