= Pharmaceutical Students Association, Uppsala =

The Pharmaceutical Student Union (in Swedish Farmacevtiska Studentkåren, nicknamed "Farmis" and "FaS") is one of six students' unions at Uppsala University. The Pharmaceutical Students Association represent all students at the Faculty of Pharmacy.

The Association was founded in 1896 at what was then the Institute of Pharmacy in Stockholm. When the institute was moved and became part of the University of Uppsala in the 1960s, the students were allowed to retain their own student union.

Up until June 2010 membership was compulsory for students enrolled at the Faculty of Pharmacy, and like other students at Uppsala University, those at the Pharmaceutical Faculty can also be members of one of the traditional thirteen student nations.

The house of the Pharmaceutical Students Association, Pharmen ("The Pharm") is located in the area known as Uppsala Science Park, next to the University Hospital, and was completed in 1992.
