= Fimpen =

Swedish film

- Directed by: Bo Widerberg
- Written by: Bo Widerberg
- Produced by: Bo Widerberg
- Cinematography: John Olsson
- Edited by: Bo Widerberg
- Release date: 16 February 1974
- Running time: 89 minutes
- Country: Sweden
- Language: Swedish

Fimpen (lit. "the cigarette butt", UK Stubby, international The Butt) is a 1974 Swedish family film written and directed by Bo Widerberg and starring Johan Bergman.

== Plot ==
Six-year-old Johan, nicknamed "Fimpen", is an extraordinarily talented football player. He is discovered and recruited to Hammarby IF and the Sweden men's national team. Performing in the 1974 World Cup qualification, he is promoted to idol status but finds it difficult to keep up in school.

== Cast ==
- Johan Bergman as Johan 'Fimpen' Bergman
- Monica Zetterlund as Teacher
- Magnus Härenstam as Mackan
- Ernst-Hugo Järegård as Club Official
- Carl Billquist as Principal
- Stig Ossian Ericson as Cab Driver

Football players appearing as themselves: Claes Cronqvist, Ralf Edström, Ove Grahn, Georg Ericson, Ronnie Hellström, Kent Karlsson, Ove Kindvall, Krister Kristensson, Bosse Larsson, Benno Magnusson, Roger Magnusson, Björn Nordqvist, Kenneth Ohlsson, Janne Olsson, Örjan Persson, Roland Sandberg, Tom Turesson and Mats Werner.

TV and radio sports commentators appearing as themselves: Bengt Bedrup, Ulf Elfving, Bengt Grive, Arne Hegerfors, Bo Holmström, Lennart Hyland and Sven Lindahl.
