= Uppsala Student Union =

Students' union at Uppsala University, Sweden

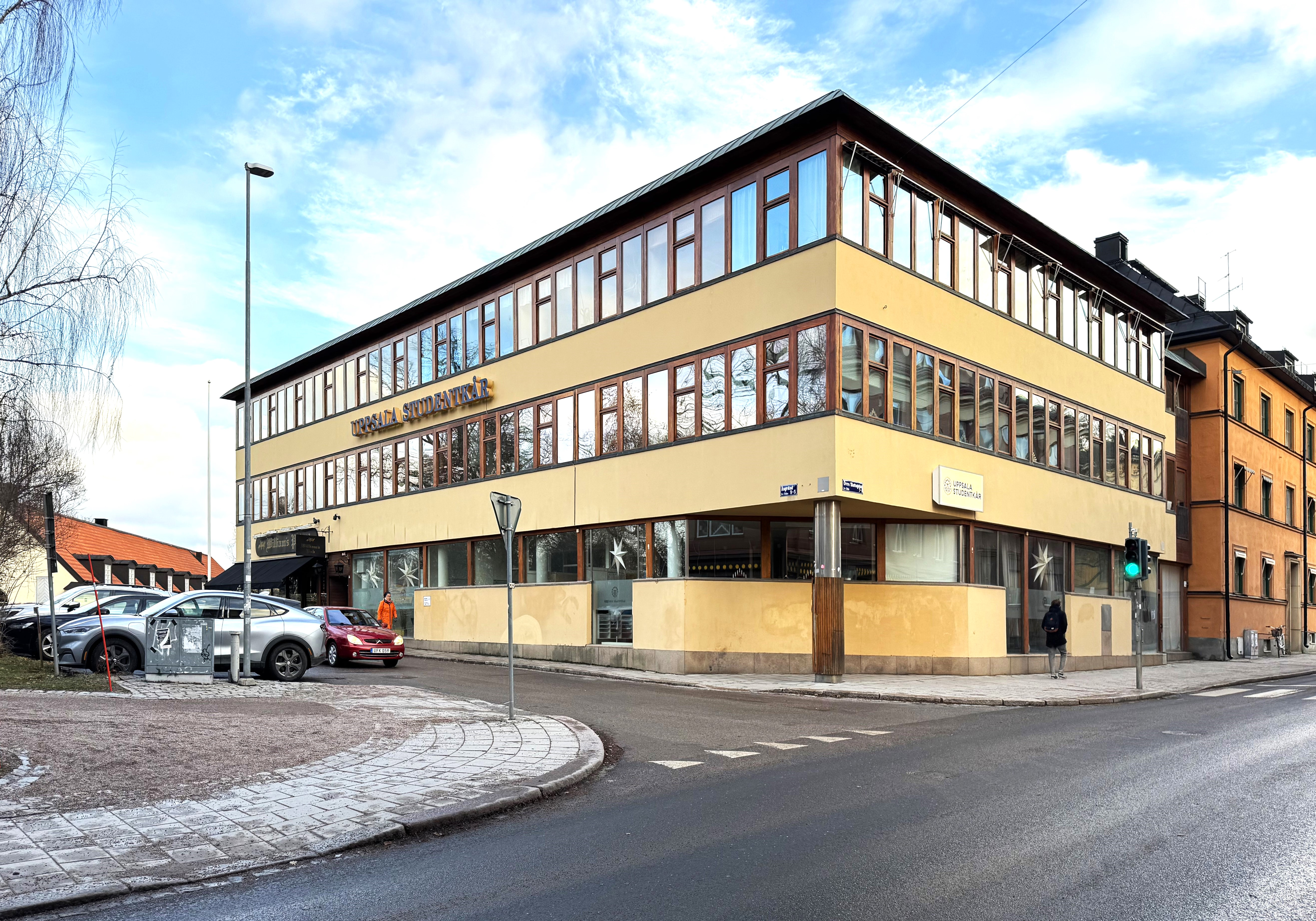
Uppsala Student Union

Uppsala Student Union (Swedish: Uppsala studentkår) is one of four students' unions at Uppsala University in Uppsala, Sweden.

According to Swedish law, university students are no longer required to be members of a students' union since 2010. Uppsala Student Union covers the Disciplinary Domain of Humanities and Social Sciences and the Faculty of Medicine at Uppsala University with the exception of students seated at the University's Gotland campus.

Uppsala Student Union was founded in March 1849 by the student nations at the university and was the first Swedish students' union. The students' union appoints student representatives to various boards and committees of the university.

Uppsala Student Union is a member of the Swedish National Union of Students.

== See also ==
- Education in Sweden
- Pharmaceutical Students Association, Uppsala
