= Stubby (nickname) =

Stubby is a nickname for the following people:

- Stubby Clapp (born 1973), minor league baseball hitting coach and player
- Lee Gordon (1902-1946), American jazz musician
- Stubby Greer (1929-1994), American minor league baseball player, coach and manager
- Harold Kruger (1897-1965), American Olympic swimmer, actor and stunt double
- Stubby Magner (1888-1956), American Major League Baseball player in 1911
- Stubby Overmire (1919-1977), American Major League Baseball pitcher
- Irv Ray (1864-1948), American Major League Baseball player
- Stubby Stubblefield (1907-1935), American racecar driver
