= Göran Thorell =

Swedish actor (born 1954)

Göran Thorell (born 24 May 1954 in Bromma, Stockholm, Sweden) is a Swedish actor. He studied at the Swedish National Academy of Mime and Acting.

== Selected filmography ==
- 2012 - The Hypnotist
- 2005 - Wallander – Afrikanen
- 2004 - Om Stig Petrés hemlighet (TV)
- 2002 - Beck – Enslingen
- 2000 - Den bästa sommaren
- 2000 - Pelle Svanslös och den stora skattjakten
- 1997 - Peter-No-Tail (TV)
- 1997 - Beck – Lockpojken
- 1990 - The Rabbit Man
