= Christer Fant =

Swedish actor

Christer Michael Fant (born 10 March 1953 in Sigtuna, Sweden) is a Swedish actor. He is a son of actor George Fant. He played the valet Melker in the 2011 "Sveriges Radios julkalender" Allt du önskar. In the 1980s he hosted the TV program Guldslipsen.

== Selected filmography ==
- 1991 - Sunes jul (TV)
- 1997 - Peter-No-Tail (TV series)
- 1998 - Pistvakt – En vintersaga (TV)
- 2000 - Gossip
- 2000 - Livet är en schlager
- 2000 - Pelle Svanslös och den stora skattjakten
- 2000 - Före stormen
- 2001 - Pusselbitar (TV)
- 2001 - Sprängaren
- 2001 - Villospår
- 2001 - Eva & Adam – fyra födelsedagar och ett fiasko
- 2003 - The Man Who Smiled
- 2003 - Ramona (TV)
- 2004 - Om Stig Petrés hemlighet (TV)
- 2005 - One Step Behind
- 2006 - LasseMajas detektivbyrå (TV series)
- 2007 - Labyrint (TV)
- 2010 - Våra vänners liv (TV)
