= Carl Billquist =

Swedish actor

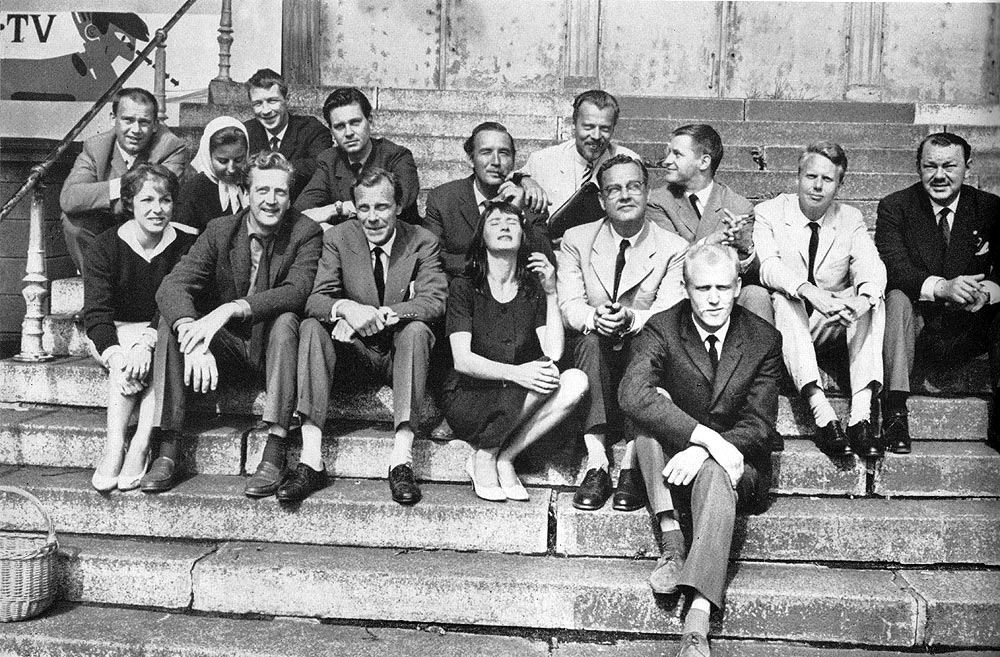
- Billquist (back row, third from the left) in 1961
- Born: Carl Folke Billquist; 19 May 1933; Malmö, Sweden
- Died: 24 May 1993 (aged 60); Stockholm, Sweden
- Occupation: Actor
- Years active: 1961–1993
- Spouse: Wiveca Billquist (m. 1964)
- Relatives: Fritiof Billquist (uncle)

Carl Folke Billquist (19 May 1933 – 24 May 1993) was a Swedish actor. He appeared in 60 films and television shows between 1961 and 1993.

== Partial filmography ==
- Lyckodrömmen (1963) - Fabian Widefjäll
- All These Women (1964) - The Young Man
- Heja Roland! (1966) - Svensson
- En sån strålande dag (1967) - Claes, ski instructor
- Miss and Mrs Sweden (1969) - Dick Lönn
- Grisjakten (1970) - Haller&Ziegler representative
- Honeymoon (1972) - Salesman
- The Day the Clown Cried (1972) - Gestapo Officer #2
- Håll alla dörrar öppna (1973) - Solveig's Suitor
- Fimpen (1974) - Principal
- Garaget (1975) - Dr. Orlander
- 91:an och generalernas fnatt (1977) - Sgt. Revär
- Barna från Blåsjöfjället (1980) - Captain Persson
- Höjdhoppar'n (1981) - President
- Peter-No-Tail (1981) - Bill (voice)
- The Simple-Minded Murderer (1982) - Flodin
- Jönssonligan och Dynamit-Harry (1982) - Kriminalkommissarie Persson
- Fanny and Alexander (1982) - Police Superintendent Jespersson - Ekdahlska huset
- Raskenstam (1983) - Photographer
- Jönssonligan får guldfeber (1984) - Persson
- Pelle Svanslös i Amerikatt (1985) - Bill (voice)
- Gröna gubbar från Y.R. (1986) - Pansarsson
- Min pappa är Tarzan (1986) - Larsson
- Jim & piraterna Blom (1987) - Jim's teacher
- Den hemliga vännen (1990) - The exhausted friend
- Dockpojken (1993) - Tillsyningsmannen (uncredited)
