= Ernst-Hugo Järegård =

Swedish actor (1928–1998)

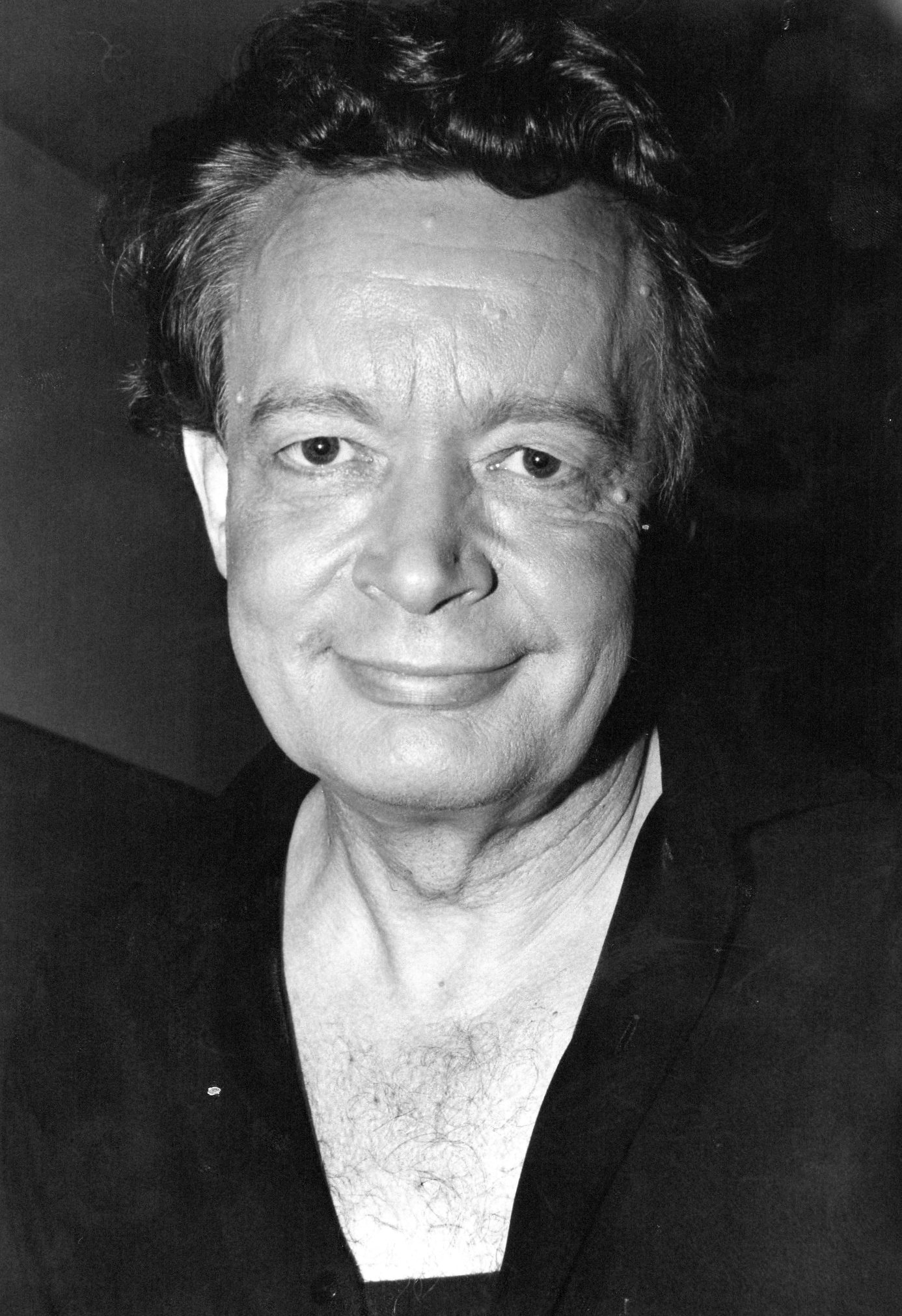
- Järegård in 1983
- Born: Ernst-Hugo Alfred Järegård; 12 December 1928; Ystad, Sweden
- Died: 6 September 1998 (aged 69); Lidingö, Sweden
- Occupation: Actor
- Years active: 1962–1998
- Spouse: Karin Nordström (m. 1949)
- Children: Johannes

Ernst-Hugo Alfred Järegård (12 December 1928 – 6 September 1998) was a Swedish actor.

== Biography ==
Järegård was born in Ystad. He received his acting training at Malmö City Theatre. From 1962 he was an actor in Sweden's prominent Royal Dramatic Theatre, where he came to perform a number of much celebrated parts: his eccentric Hitler in Schweik in the Second World War by Bertolt Brecht (1963), Estragon in the legendary 1966 Dramaten-staging of Samuel Beckett's Waiting for Godot, Thersites in Shakespeare's Troilus and Cressida 1967, Orgon in Molière's Tartuffe 1971, Hjalmar Ekdahl in Ingmar Bergman's 1972 production of Ibsen's The Wild Duck, Nero in Jean Racine's Britannicus (1974), a spot-on portrayal of August Strindberg in play Tribadernas natt (The Night of the Tribades) by Per Olov Enquist, the title role in Richard III by Shakespeare (1980) and the extremely creepy – and slightly perverted – boss Sven in VD ("CEO") by Stig Larsson in 1985, among others.

Järegård had a taste for villainous and dark characters, and enjoyed playing them. But he also had a very lyrical and soft side to him as an actor, something he showed in the TV production of Hans Christian och sällskapet (where he plays a village priest who suffers a great personal tragedy as his wife loses her mind after having a baby) and in the TV adaptation of Birger Sjöberg's Frida och hennes vän (based on Sjöberg's Frida's Book) where he plays the light-hearted, daydreaming early 1900s love-struck suitor of Frida. Adding the fact that Järegård also had a beautiful and expressive singing voice (he performed in a number of stage musicals during his career) gave him an incredible range and versatility as an actor. He originated the role of Guido in the first European staging of the musical Nine, for example (Oscarsteatern, Stockholm, 1983).

His distinct and original voice (with traces of the unmistakable Skåne-dialect) also made him a much appreciated and beloved narrator of children's cartoons and audio books. Particularly popular are his audio book (originally radio) recordings of Roald Dahl's Charlie and the Chocolate Factory, Robert Louis Stevenson's Dr Jekyll and Mr Hyde, and the narration of Sergei Prokofiev's Peter and the Wolf.

Järegård went on to play the villainous character Elaka Måns (Mean Mike in the English dub) in the Swedish animated movie Peter-No-Tail and its sequel Peter-No-Tail in Americat. He also lent him voice for the Swedish dub of the film Valhalla, playing the Norse god Loki; god of mischief.

Järegård gained international attention when he took on the role of Doctor Helmer in Lars von Trier's highly acclaimed mini-series Riget and Riget II (aka The Kingdom I & II). He also appeared in von Trier's Europa. He participated in about 20 movies and 40 TV productions: aside from the Riget-series; some of his greatest roles are in the Skånska mord-series, in the 1975 Hasse & Tage comedy Släpp fångarne loss, det är vår! (Release the Prisoners to Spring), in the 1962 cult movie Raggargänget, in Kådisbellan (aka The Slingshot) in 1993 and as the pompous old drag queen Ragnar Rönn in the teleplay Cheek to Cheek (written and directed by Jonas Gardell), 1997. Also in 1997 he appeared in CHOCK as the series' host and presented each episode. Usually he would make elaborate philosophical and mystical statements regarding the plot of each episode.

For his acting work, he was awarded with the Thalia prize (1967) and the Eugene O'Neill Award (1975), two of Sweden's most prestigious theatre awards.

Järegård married Karin Nordström (1923–2017) in 1949. They had a son called Johannes. Ernst-Hugo Järegård died of multiple myeloma in Lidingö, aged 69.

== Personality ==
Järegård was a very colourful theatre personality who loved to stand out and celebrated originality. He loved clothes and Italian designers and was picky with designer labels in private – only the best would do. He was of the old belief that as an actor you not only represent yourself as a public person but also the theatre and the art as a whole; as being part of a public institution there for people; and therefore it is an actor's responsibility to "scrub up".

In his director's commentary on the DVD release of Europa, Lars von Trier commented that Järegård was difficult to work with, frequently sulking and making outrageous demands such as insisting on staying in one specific room in a specific hotel of his choice. He stated that Järegård was a compulsive scene-stealer who could not help attracting the focus even when he was supposed to be in the background of a scene. Von Trier claims that he eventually 'trained' Järegård by rewarding him with cigars for good behaviour but also called the actor "dear Ernst-Hugo" and said he misses him terribly.

== Partial filmography ==
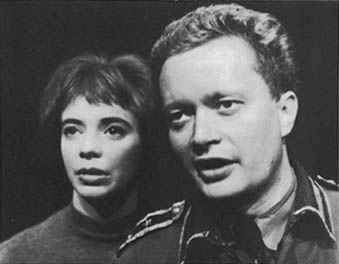
Young Järegård on stage with Margit Carlqvist in Jean-Paul Sartre's Fångarna på Altona (The Condemned of Altona), Gothenburg City Theatre, 1961.

- Raggargänget (1962) – Berra
- Adam och Eva (1963) – Kejsarskägget
- Svenska bilder (1964) – Karlman
- Ön (1966) – Vicar Byström
- Tartuffe (1966, TV Movie) – Tartuffe
- Rooftree (1967) – Magnus
- Het snö (1968) – Lennart Stenhäll
- Waiting for Godot (1971, TV Movie) – Estragon
- Kvartetten som sprängdes (aka "The Quartet That Broke Up") (1973, TV Mini-Series) – Stolz
- De tre från Haparanda (1974, TV Mini-Series) – Fredrik Jönsson
- Fimpen (1974) – Club Official
- En handfull kärlek (1974) – Claes Crona
- Släpp fångarne loss, det är vår! (Release the Prisoners to Spring) (1975) – Harald Hansson
- Chez Nous (1978) – Owner of Chez Nous
- Flygnivå 450 (1980) – Giron
- Clownen Jac (1981, TV Movie) – Jac the Clown
- Peter-No-Tail (1981) – Elake Måns (voice)
- Hans Christian och sällskapet (1981, TV Movie) – Hans-Cristian
- Gråtvalsen (1983, TV Movie) – Hugo (as Ernst Hugo Järegård)
- Peter-No-Tail in Americat (1985) – Elake Måns (voice)
- Skånska mord (aka "Skåne Murders") (1986, TV Movie) – Martin Svensson
- Valhalla (1986) – Loke (Swedish version, voice)
- Fadern, sonen och den helige ande (1987) – Father
- VD (1988, TV Movie) – Sven, VD
- Bryllupsfesten (1989) – Eugene Borchrewink
- Den hemliga vännen (1990) – The man
- Europa (1991) – Uncle Kessler
- The Great Day on the Beach (1991) – Narrator
- Den goda viljan (Best Intentions) (1992, TV Mini-Series) – Professor Sundelius
- Nästa man till rakning (1993, TV Mini-Series)
- Kådisbellan (1993) – Teacher Lundin
- Det bli'r i familien (1993) – Håkon Borelius
- The Kingdom (1994–1997, TV Series) – Stig Helmer
- Cheek to Cheek (1997, TV Movie) – Ragnar Rönn
- CHOCK (1997, TV Series) – Presentatör
- Dimension (2010, posthumously uncredited)

== Stage work ==
- Järegård's stage credits, dramaten.se; accessed 9 December 2014.

== Sources ==
- Wennerholm, Eric: Ernst-Hugo – inte lik någon annan, Bonniers, Stockholm, 1983 (biography) (Sweden)
- "Filmerna kunde vara dåliga men aldrig han" by Jan Lumholt, Cinema magazine, 1998 article (in Swedish)
