= Nils Eklund =

Swedish actor (1927–2026)

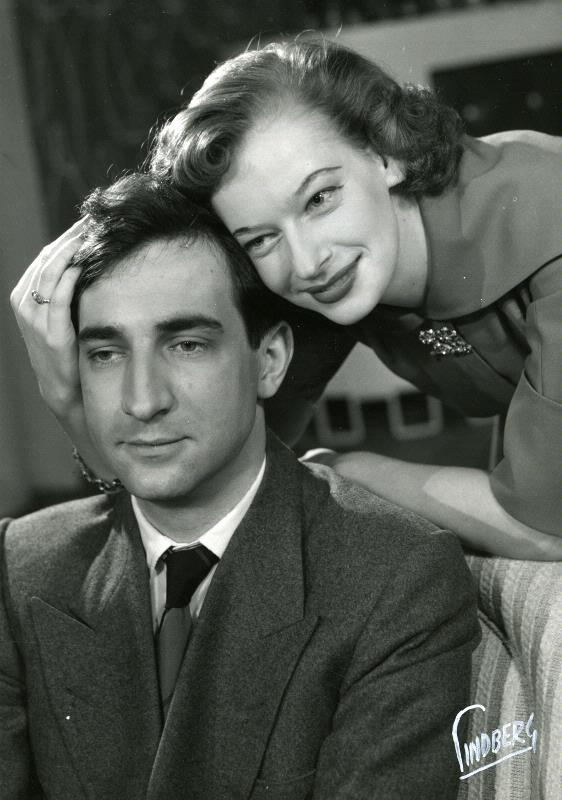
- Eklund and Marianne Stjernqvist in 1950
- Born: 17 January 1927; Stockholm, Sweden
- Died: 4 August 2026 (aged 99)
- Occupation: Actor
- Years active: 1952–2019

Nils Ernst Gustaf Eklund (17 January 1927 – 4 August 2026) was a Swedish actor. He appeared in more than 50 films and television shows from 1952 until his retirement in 2019.

Eklund died on 4 August 2026, at the age of 99.

== Selected filmography ==
- Bom the Flyer (1952)
- Äktenskapsbrottaren (1964)
- Rooftree (1967)
- Doctor Glas (1968)
- The Bookseller Gave Up Bathing (1969)
- Pistol (1973)
- Peter-No-Tail (1981)
- Göta kanal eller Vem drog ur proppen? (1981)
- The Journey to Melonia (1989)
- Freud Leaving Home (1991)
- Up (2009) as Charles F. Muntz (Swedish version)
