= Gösta Knutsson =

Swedish radio producer and writer

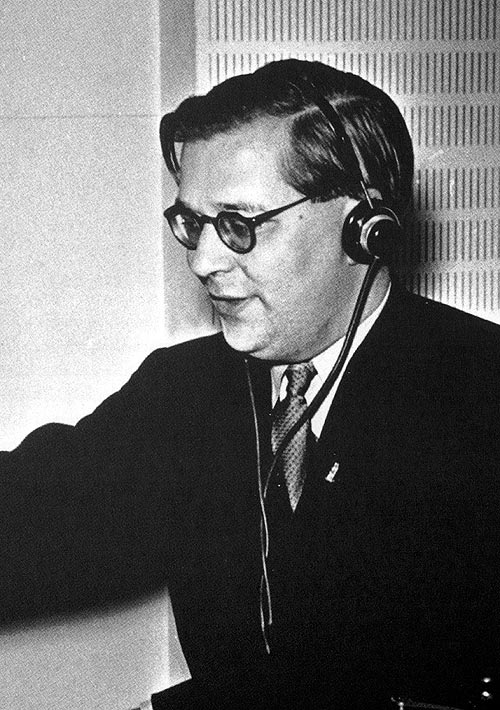
- Gösta Knutsson in the 1950s.
- Born: Gösta Johansson; 12 October 1908; Stockholm, Sweden
- Died: 4 April 1973 (aged 64)
- Education: University of Uppsala
- Occupation: Writer
- Writing career
- Notable work: Pelle Svanslös

Gösta Lars August Knutsson (original surname Johansson; 12 October 1908 – 4 April 1973) was a Swedish radio producer and writer of a popular series of children's books about the cat Pelle Svanslös.

Gösta Knutsson was born in a middle-class family in Stockholm and came to the University of Uppsala as a student, remaining in Uppsala for the rest of his life. After completing an M.A. degree, he was curator (chairman) of the Stockholm Nation and later chairman of the Uppsala Student Union (1936–1938). He was also editor of the student union paper Ergo 1940–42. During his time as student union chairman, he was also employed as head of the Uppsala office of the Swedish National Radio and remained there from 1936 until 1969. As such he introduced the quiz show in Sweden, with the first one recruiting the two teams from two of the student nations in Uppsala.

Knutsson is most remembered for his series of children's books about Pelle Svanslös, 'Peter No-Tail', a good-hearted and often naïve cat whose tail had been bitten off by a rat when he was a kitten. The books contain a number of other cats such as Pelle's darling Maja Gräddnos ('Mary Cream-nose') or his adversary, the bully Elaka Måns ('Mean Magnus'), who never fails to remind Pelle of his lack of a tail, and Måns' two followers Bill and Bull, who tend to repeat everything Måns says in fragmentary and garbled form. The anthropomorphic cats mostly live in the area around the cathedral and the university in Uppsala, seen from a somewhat feline perspective.

Knutsson has said that the tailless cat Pelle was based on a real cat he had himself known for a summer in his childhood, but also that the cat was his own alter ego. Maja Gräddnos is supposedly based on his own wife Erna (1926–2023). Måns is generically evil with elements fetched from Hitler and Mussolini. The other cats were all caricatures of people among Knutsson's own circle of friends and acquaintances in Uppsala.

Pelle Svanslös made his public debut in a story told by Knutsson on radio in 1937, with the first book appearing in 1939. The Pelle Svanslös books have been reprinted in Swedish many times and have also been translated to Finnish, Danish, Norwegian, German, Latvian, Ukrainian, Polish and English.

As a nationally well-known character, Pelle Svanslös has been used by the municipality of Uppsala for marketing purposes. There is a "Pelle Svanslös House" for children in Uppsala, and during summer the tourist office arranges daily Pelle Svanslös-related walks for children (and sometimes nostalgic adults).

The asteroid 8534 Knutsson has been named by Uppsala astronomers in honour of Gösta Knutsson, and other asteroids have been named after cats from his books: 8535 Pellesvanslös, 8536 Måns, 8537 Billochbull, 8538 Gammelmaja (named after Gammel-Maja, 'Old Mary', a wise old cat living in the cathedral) and 8539 Laban (after the cat Laban, who lives in the Observatory park and has also given name to one of the first computers of the Department of Astronomy).
