= Sigtuna =

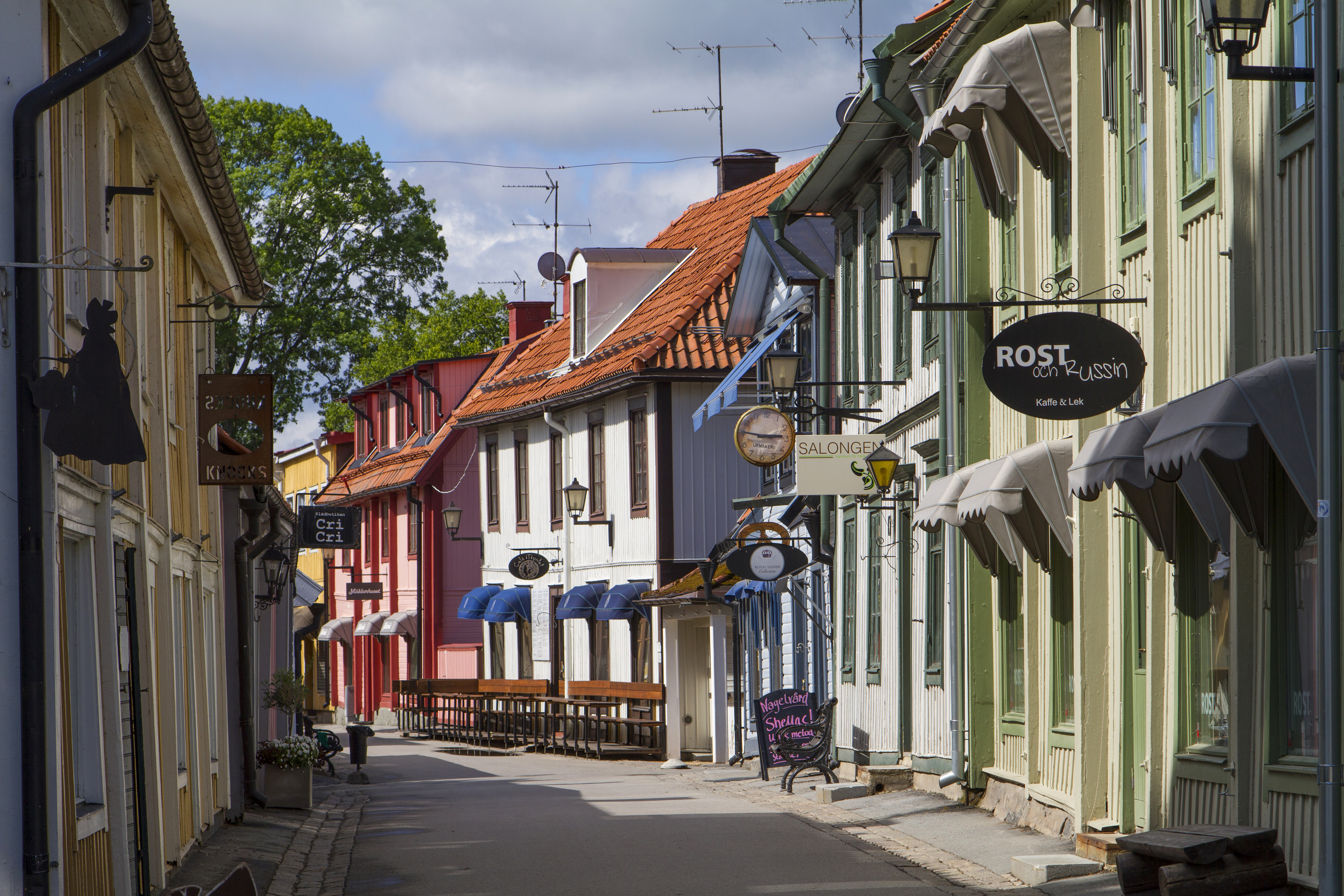
- Stora gatan, the old main street

- Coat of arms

- Location within Stockholm Location within Sweden Location within European Union
- Coordinates: 59°37′N 17°43′E
- Country: Sweden
- Province: Uppland
- County: Stockholm County
- Municipality: Sigtuna Municipality

Area
  - Total: 4.57 km^{2} (1.76 sq mi)

Population (31 December 2020)
  - Total: 9,689
  - Density: 1,849/km^{2} (4,790/sq mi)
- Time zone: UTC+1 (CET)
  - Summer (DST): UTC+2 (CEST)
- Website: Official website

Sigtuna (Note: Swedish pronunciation: [ˈsɪ̂kːˌtʉːna]) is a locality in the west of in the eponymous Sigtuna Municipality, in Stockholm County, Sweden. It counted 9,689 inhabitants in 2020. The seat of the municipality is a locality to the east, Märsta. Sigtuna is for historical reasons still often referred to as a stad.

Sigtuna is on Skarven, a bay alongside Upplands-Bro and part of Lake Mälaren. Present-day Sigtuna, a harbour town that was established around 980, developed about 4 kilometres (2.5 mi) east of Old Sigtuna, which, according to Old Norse religion, was previously the home of the widely revered god Odin.

== Etymology ==
The name is closely linked with higher land to the north, Signhildsberg. It is a compound name where the second element means a settlement -tuna.

However first may be among now-rare, close, dialectal words: sig meaning "seeping water" or "swamp" or sik meaning "swamp". As a basis for this interpretation, a brook south of Signhildsberg has been mentioned, or the fact that the estate was surrounded by marshy terrain.

Another theory considers the name to be an ancient prestigious "wander toponym", meaning "strong fortress", like the Celtic toponym Segodunum, from Proto-Germanic *sigatūna, Old Norse Sigtún, cf. Proto-Germanic *segaz ~ *sigiz- "victory": Gothic sigis, Old Norse sigr, Old English sigor, Old Frisian sige, sīge, Old High German sigi, sigu.

== History ==
Sigtuna was founded on what was then the shore of Lake Mälaren just over 1,000 years ago. It took its name from an ancient royal estate (see Uppsala öd) several kilometers to the west (see Fornsigtuna). Various sources claim King Eric the Victorious as founder while others claim King Olof Skötkonung.

It operated as a royal and commercial centre for some 250 years, and was one of the most important cities of Sweden. During a brief period at the end of the 10th and beginning of the 11th century, Sweden's first coins were minted here. St. Mary's Church, built in the 13th century by the Dominican order as a monastery church, still remains largely intact. The Dominican monastery played an important role in the Swedish Middle Ages and produced many important church officials, among them many Swedish archbishops. Many church and monastery ruins still stand, including St. Pers Church (S:t Pers kyrkoruin) dating from the 1100s, St. Olof Church (S:t Olofs kyrkoruin) dated from around the middle of the 11th century, and St. Lars Church (S:t Lars kyrkoruin) dating from the middle of the 13th century.

In 1187, Sigtuna was attacked and pillaged by raiders from across the Baltic Sea, possibly from Curonia, or Estonians from the island of Saaremaa (Oeselians), or Karelians and Novgorodians, Archaeological excavations have not verified the traditions of destruction of the town. Normal life in Sigtuna continued until the town started to slowly lose its importance during the 13th century due to navigability problems caused by post-glacial rebound.

The current coat of arms can be traced to the town's first known seal, dating from 1311. According to a legend (possibly inspired by the town arms), Sigtuna was once the Royal seat, but this cannot be confirmed. The crown may also symbolize the large royal mint in the town. Since 1971 the coat of arms has been valid for the much larger Sigtuna Municipality.

In the late 19th century Sigtuna still hosted only about 600 people, and was the smallest town in Sweden. The town remained insignificant until the second half of the 20th century. Much of the population growth can be related to Stockholm Arlanda Airport (IATA: ARN), 10 km from Sigtuna.

== Tourist attractions ==
Sigtuna has a medieval-style town centre with restaurants, cafes and small shops. The old church ruins, Viking runestones and the old main street (Stora gatan) are popular attractions for tourists, especially in the summertime. The small streets with low-built wooden houses lead up to several handicrafts shops and the old tiny town hall (Sigtuna Rådhus). There are restaurants and Sigtuna Stadshotell, a hotel in the town centre.

== Gallery ==
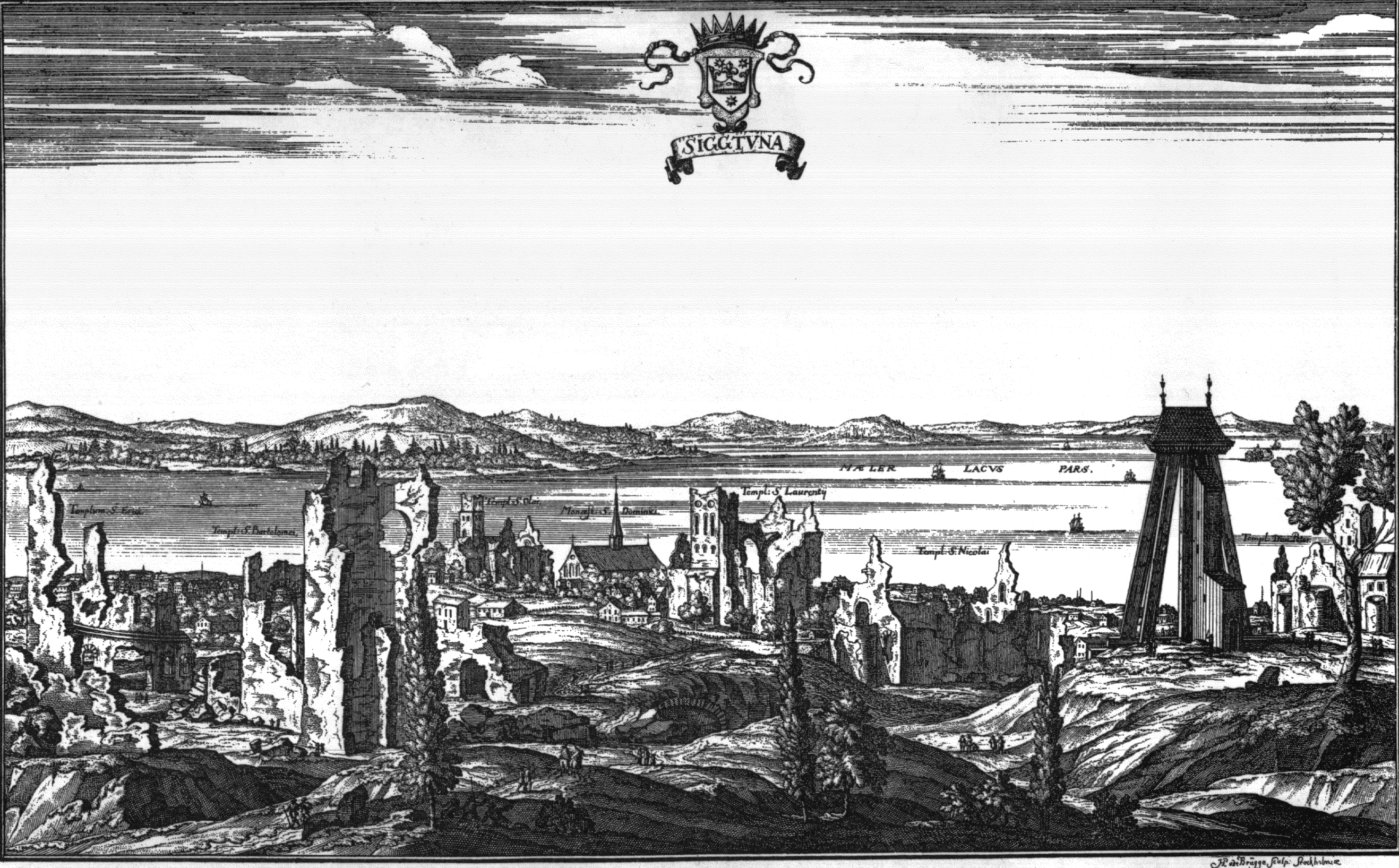
Sigtuna as it looked around 1700. Engraving from Suecia antiqua et hodierna

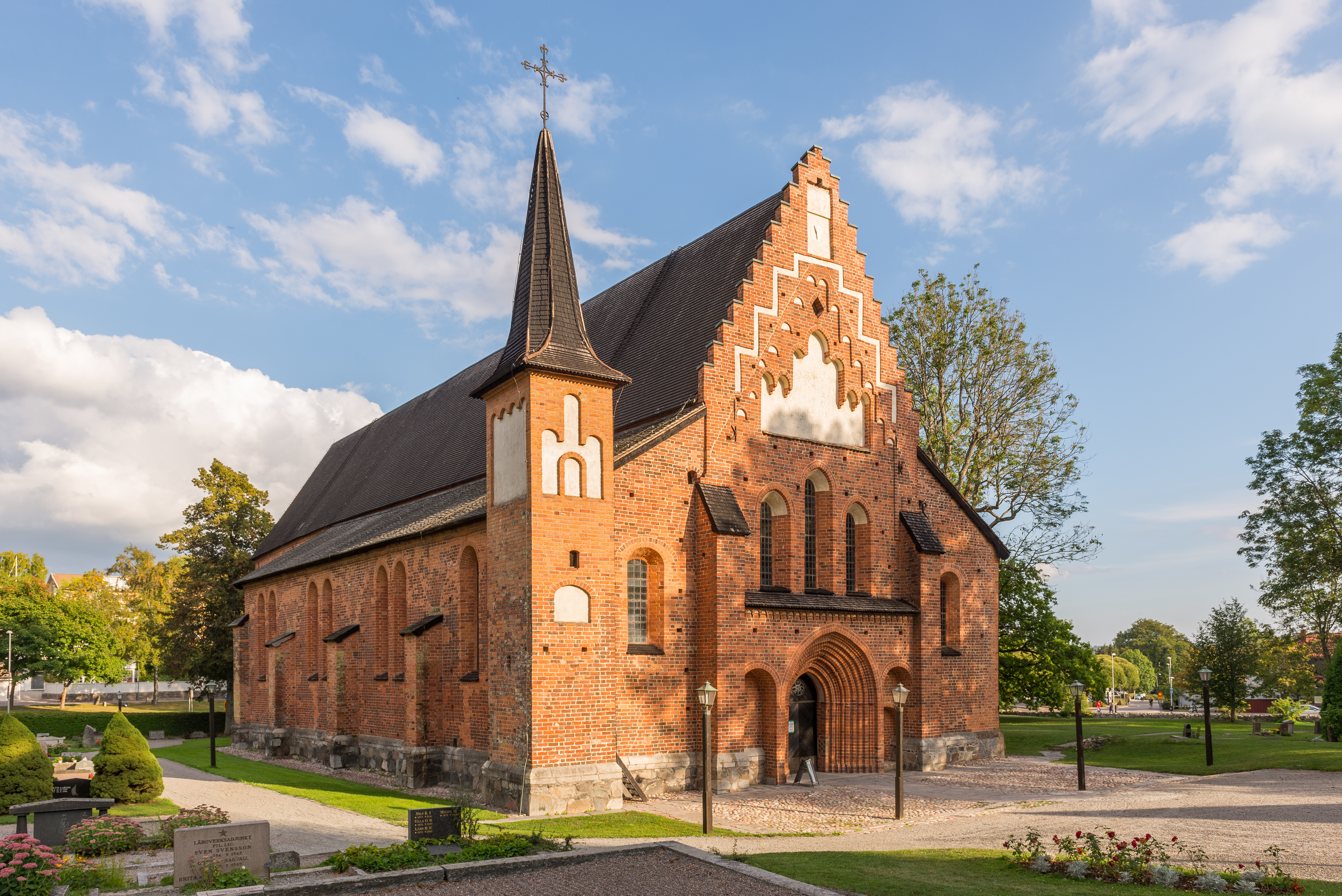
St. Mary's Church (Mariakyrkan) is a fine example of Brick Gothic architecture in Sweden

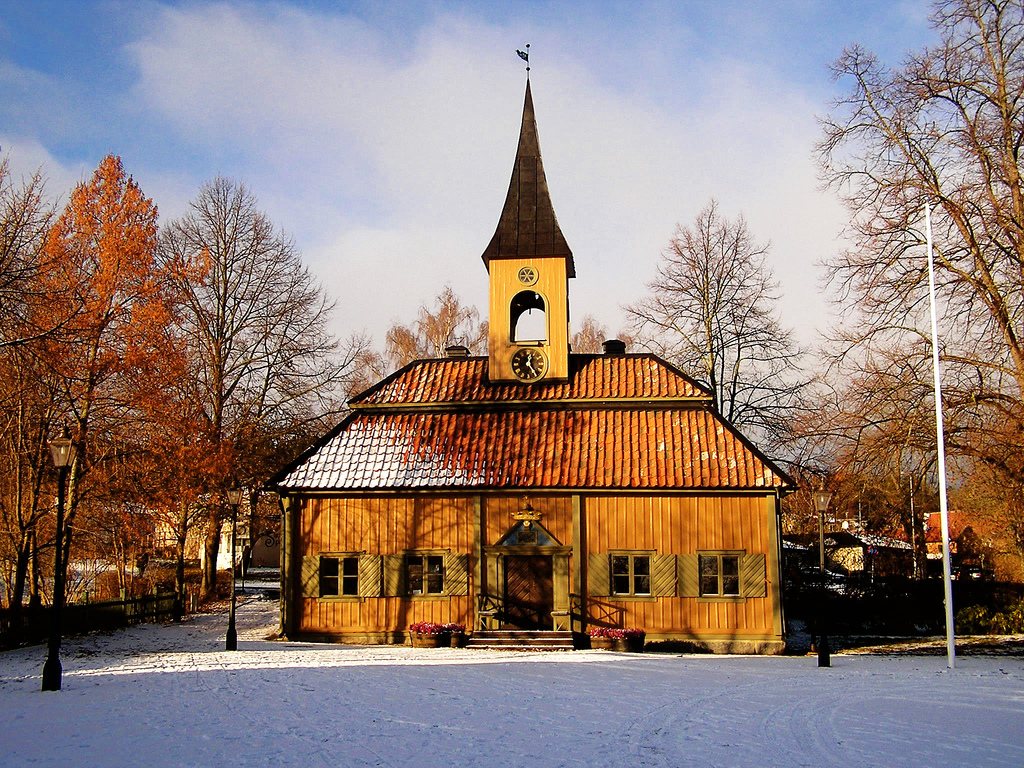
Sigtuna old town hall in early winter

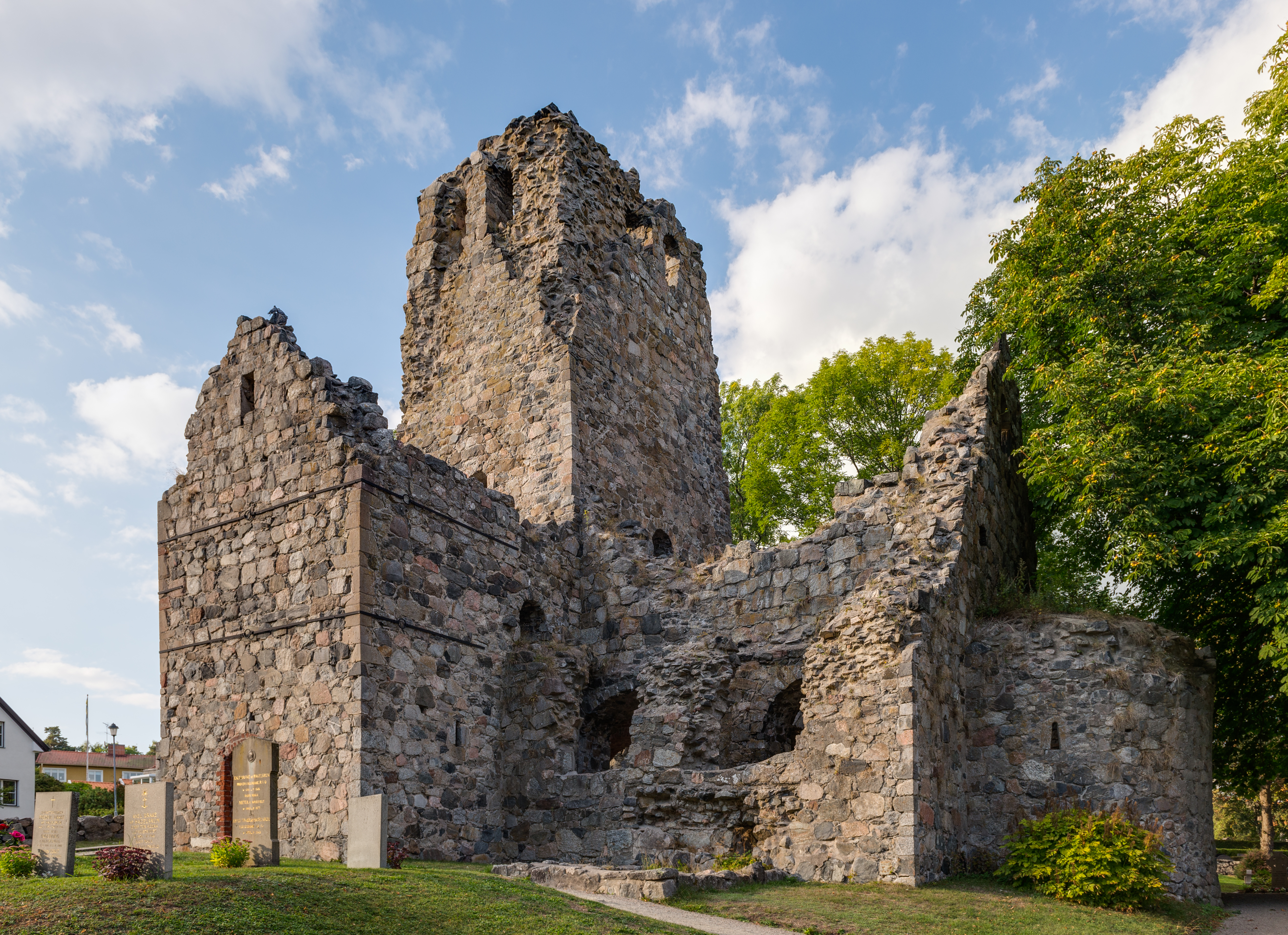
St Olof's Church ruin (S:t Olofs kyrkoruin)

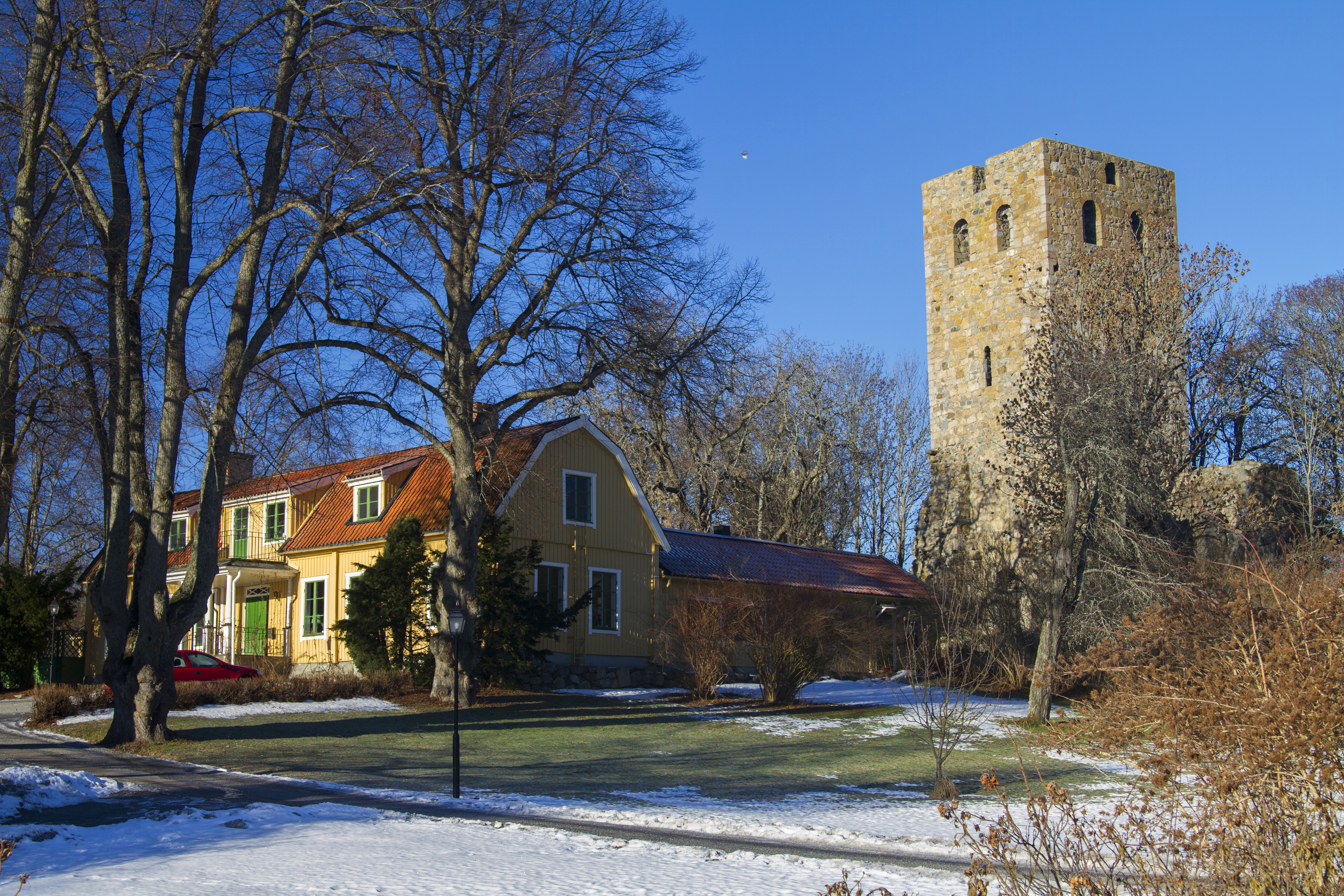
Sigtuna vicarage and St Per's Church ruin (S:t Pers kyrkoruin)

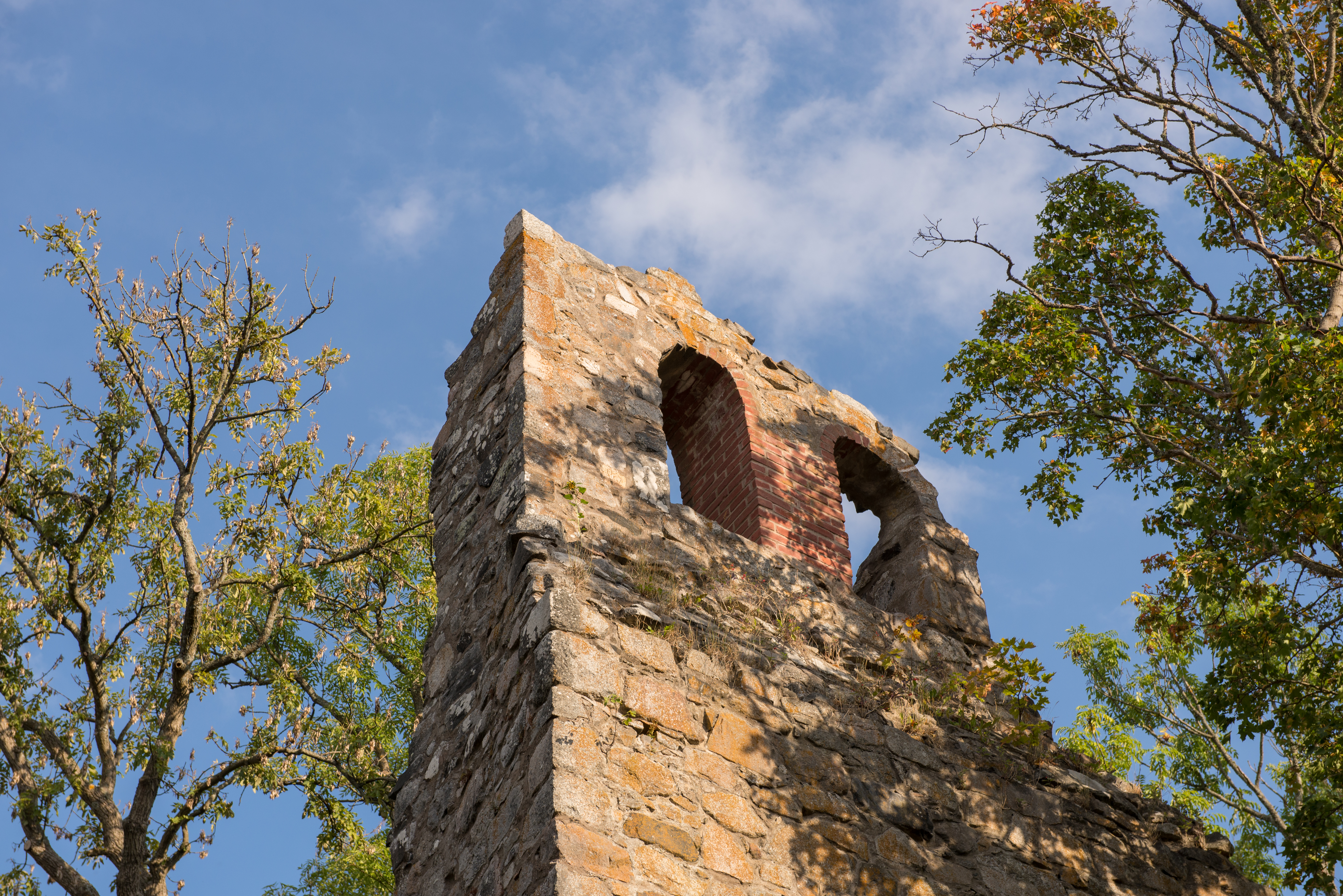
St Lars Church ruin (S:t Lars kyrkoruin)

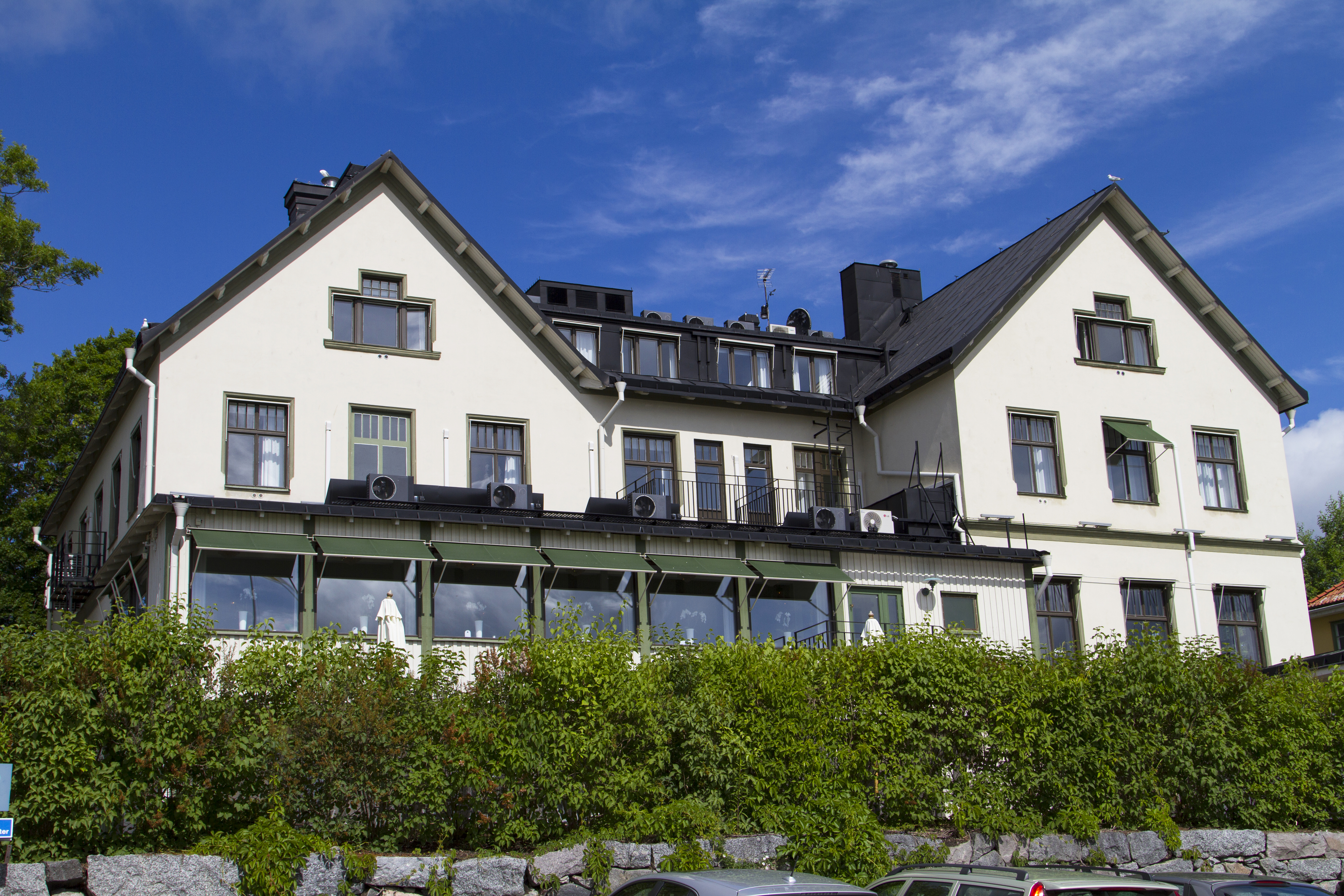
Sigtuna Stadshotell, the traditional town hotel overlooking lake Mälaren

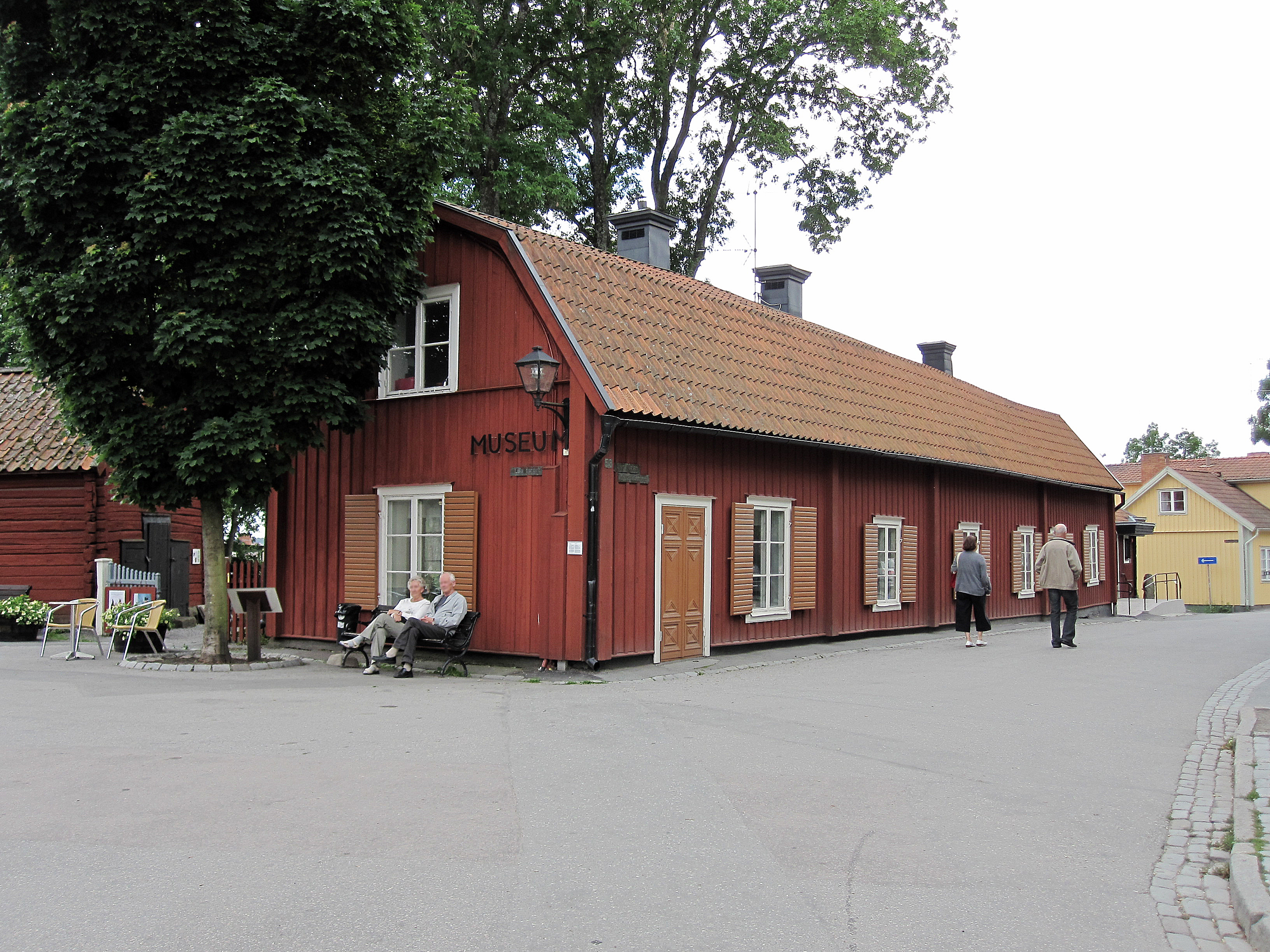
Sigtuna Museum

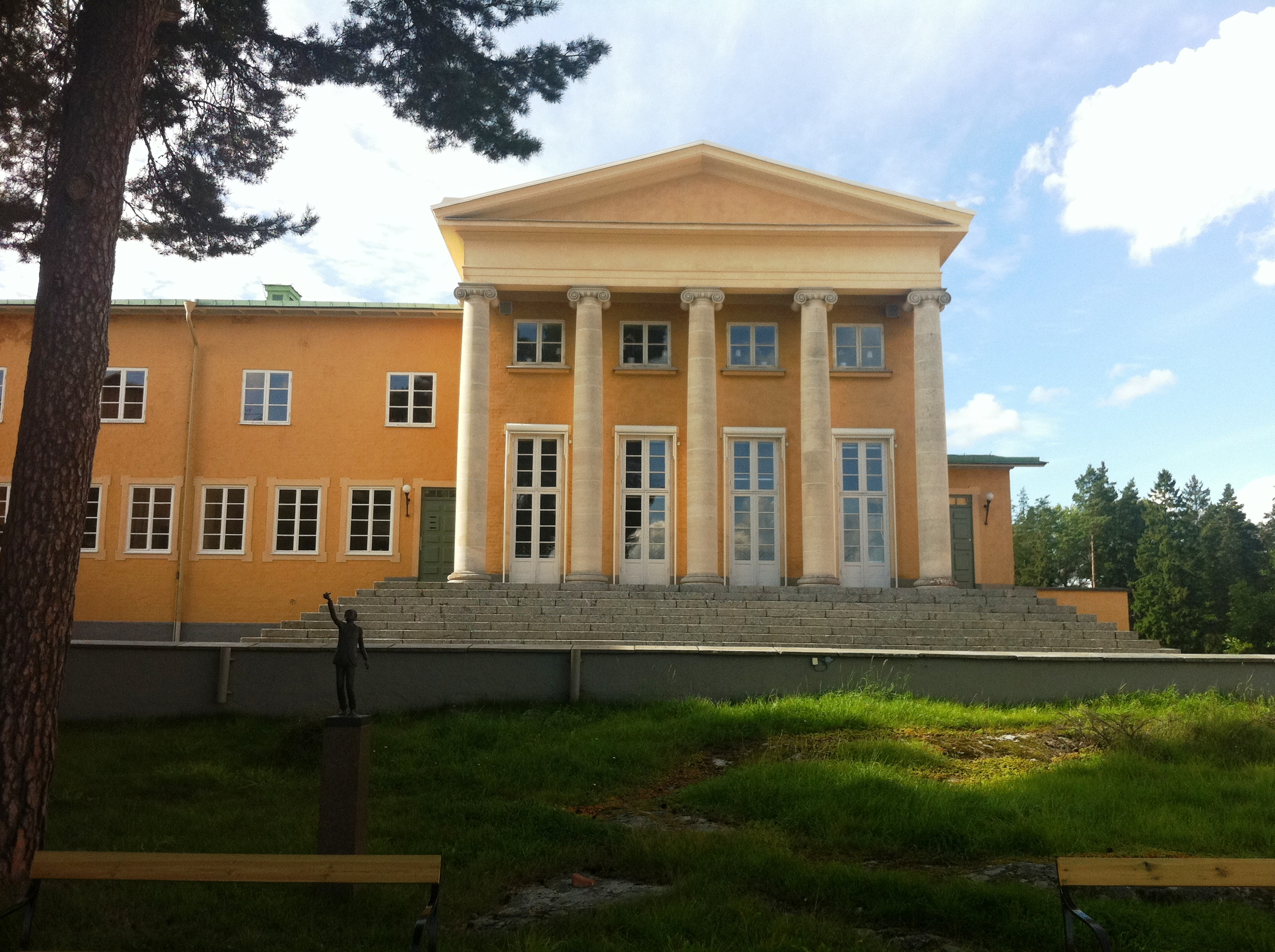
Sigtunaskolan Humanistiska Läroverket (boarding school)

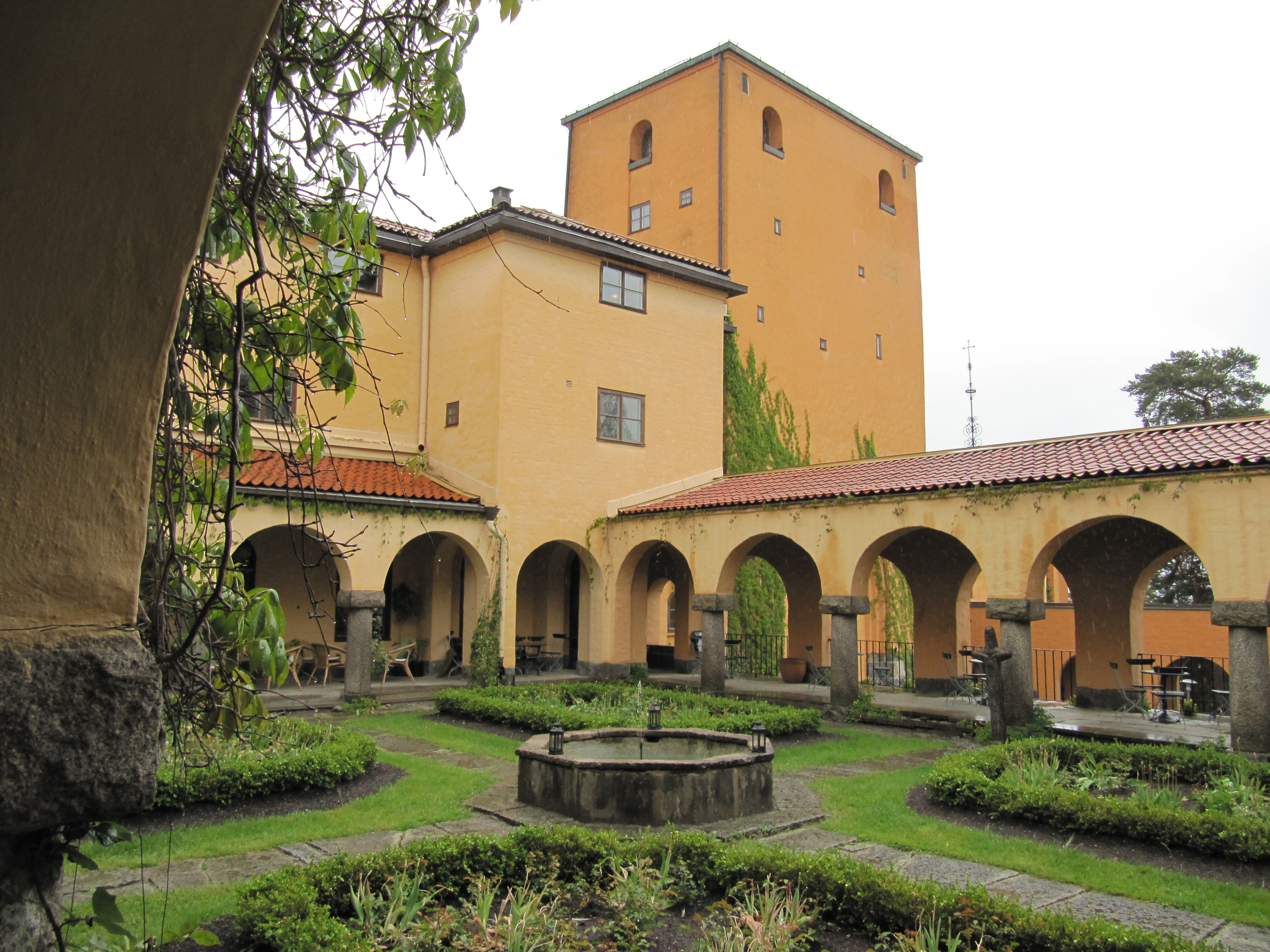
The Sigtuna foundation (Sigtunastiftelsen), a private cultural foundation established in 1917

== Sports ==
- Sigtuna IF, sports club

== Notable people ==
- Christer Fant, actor
- Gustav Levin, actor
- Jennifer Palm Lundberg, pageant contestant, Miss World Sweden 2008
- Sam Weihagen, travel group executive

== Twin towns – sister cities ==
Sigtuna is twinned with:

- Raisio, Finland

== See also ==
- Sigtunaskolan Humanistiska Läroverket, a famous boarding school.
- Luodian is a replica of Sigtuna in Shanghai

== Related reading ==
- Tesch, Sten; Jacques Vincent (2003) Vyer från medeltidens Sigtuna (Sigtuna Museum) ISBN 9789197112802
- Hjorth, Agnete; Edéus, Anne-Marie (2006) Sigtunabilder : hus och människor i gamla Sigtuna (Svartsjö: Förlag Agnete Hjorth) ISBN 9177988639
