= Sweden in the Eurovision Song Contest 2006 =

- Eurovision Song Contest 2006
- Participating broadcaster: Sveriges Television (SVT)
- Country: Sweden
- Selection process: Melodifestivalen 2006
- Selection date: 18 March 2006

Competing entry
- Song: "Invincible"
- Artist: Carola
- Songwriters: Thomas G:son; Bobby Ljunggren; Henrik Wikström; Carola Häggkvist

Placement
- Semi-final result: Qualified (4th, 214 points)
- Final result: 5th, 170 points

Participation chronology

Sweden was represented at the Eurovision Song Contest 2006 with the song "Invincible", written by Thomas G:son, Bobby Ljunggren, Henrik Wikström, and Carola Häggkvist, and performed by Carola herself. The Swedish participating broadcaster, Sveriges Television (SVT), selected its entry through Melodifestivalen 2006. Carola had already represented Sweden in 1983, and had won the contest in 1991.

== Before Eurovision ==
=== Melodifestivalen 2006 ===
Sveriges Television (SVT) selected its entry in the Eurovision Song Contest 2006 through Melodifestivalen 2006. Before the final there were four heats and a second chance round, with all shows presented by Lena Philipsson, who won Melodifestivalen 2004 and subsequently represented Sweden in 2004. The top two songs in each heat directly qualified for the final, while the 3rd and 4th placed songs went forward to the second-chance round. With the votes from the jury and televote, Carola won the Melodifestivalen singing the song "Evighet" (Eternity). The song was composed by Thomas G:son, Bobby Ljunggren, and Henrik Wikström, with lyrics by Thomas G:son and Carola Häggkvist.

==== Heats and Second Chance round ====
- The first heat took place on 18 February 2006 at the Ejendals Arena in Leksand. "Sing for Me" performed by Andreas Johnson and "Jag ljuger så bra" performed by Linda Bengtzing qualified directly to the final, while "The Name of Love" performed by Magnus Bäcklund and "Kameleont" performed by Electric Banana Band advanced to the Second Chance round. "Aiayeh (The Music of the Samba)" performed by Simone Moreno, "This Woman" performed by Anna Sahlene, "Kuddkrig" performed by Pandang, and "Naughty Boy" performed by Hannah Graaf were eliminated from the contest.
- The second heat took place on 25 February 2006 at the Löfbergs Lila Arena in Karlstad. "Lev livet!" performed by Magnus Carlsson and "I dag och i morgon" performed by Kikki Danielsson qualified directly to the final, while "En droppe regn" performed by Niclas Wahlgren and "Mi amore" performed by Velvet advanced to the Second Chance round. "Oh Yeah" performed by the Elephantz, "Etymon" performed by Sonja Aldén, "Ge mig en kaka till kaffet" performed by Östen med Resten, and "La chica de la copa" performed by Pablo Cepeda were eliminated from the contest.
- The third heat took place on 4 March 2006 at the Arena Rosenholm in Karlskrona. "Night of Passion" performed by the Poodles and "Temple of Love" performed by BWO qualified directly to the final, while "Faller du så faller jag" performed by Patrik Isaksson and "Golden Star" performed by Elysion advanced to the Second Chance round. "When Love's Comin' Back Again" performed by Jessica Folcker, "Mi amor" performed by Gregor, "Kalla nätter" performed by Jessica Andersson, and "Innan natten är över" performed by Kayo were eliminated from the contest.
- The fourth heat took place on 11 March 2006 at the Scandinavium in Gothenburg. "Evighet" performed by Carola and "Älskar du livet" performed by Björn Kjellman qualified directly to the final, while "Mama, Take Me Home" performed by Rednex and "Silverland" performed by Roger Pontare advanced to the Second Chance round. "Don't Try to Stop Me" performed by Laila Adèle, "Like Fire Tonight" performed by Günther and the Sunshine Girls, "Jag tar det jag vill ha" performed by Sandra Dahlberg, and "Under Your Spell" performed by Evan were eliminated from the contest.
- The Second Chance round (Andra chansen) took place on 12 March 2006 at TV-huset in Stockholm. "Mama, Take Me Home" performed by Rednex and "The Name of Love" performed by Magnus Bäcklund qualified to the final.

==== Final ====
SVT held the final on 18 March 2006 at the Globe Arena in Stockholm.

R/O	Artist	Song	Jury	Televote	Total	Place
1	Andreas Johnson	"Sing for Me"	112	88	200	3
2	Björn Kjellman	"Älskar du livet"	6	0	6	9
3	Linda Bengtzing	"Jag ljuger så bra"	34	22	56	7
4	The Poodles	"Night of Passion"	32	66	98	4
5	Magnus Carlsson	"Lev livet!"	19	0	19	8
6	Rednex	"Mama, Take Me Home"	17	44	61	6
7	Carola	"Evighet"	102	132	234	1
8	Magnus Bäcklund	"The Name of Love"	57	11	68	5
9	Kikki Danielsson	"I dag och i morgon"	2	0	2	10
10	BWO	"Temple of Love"	92	110	202	2

=== Controversy ===
Her entry in the contest sparked controversy. From the moment she declared that she would be entering the 2006 contest, there were cries that she had just won the contest out of fear of her already established fanbase voting her to victory no matter what she sang. Carola was also criticized for her prior statements about homosexuality and for her use of "personal assistants" who largely controlled what she said and didn't say when she appeared in public.

The controversy of Carolagate was further inflamed by a series of mysterious events during the semi-final from which she qualified (Gothenburg) and during the final in Stockholm itself. Further, during the recap for the voting of the Gothenburg semi-final, the recap of Carola's performance ran for approximately 30 seconds instead of the traditional 10–12.

During the final, people had major problems televoting for several entrants, the brunt of which were revolved around two entrants: Andreas Johnson and BWO, the two entrants who placed 2nd and 3rd. While there were wide reports of people not being able to vote for these two entrants, nobody complained about complications when voting for Carola. Furthermore, during the recap for voting, SVT used footage from the Gothenburg semi-final when showing Carola's entry, which wouldn't have been so suspicious and noticeable had Carola not had a throat infection which resulted in a less stellar performance than in Gothenburg.

Though not part of the controversy, the aforementioned throat infection persisted, which led to Carola being forced to alter (lower) her vocals for the last stanza (the one with the wailing, which wasn't wailing anymore) when performing "Invincible" in Athens.

== At Eurovision ==
Because Sweden placed 19th at the 2005 contest, Carola was forced to compete in the Eurovision semi-final she performed 20th, following Portugal and preceding Estonia. Sweden finished in 4th place with 214 points, thus qualifying for the final. At the final, Carola performed in 22nd spot and at the end of voting received 170 points and finished in 5th place. It is notable that this is Carola's third top 5 finish in the Eurovision Song Contest (3rd in 1983, 1st in 1991 and 5th in 2006). Also, Carola achieved her 5th place without receiving any 12 points, unlike most other of the top 10 countries that year. Meaning that Sweden automatically qualified for the final in the 2007 contest.

=== Voting ===
==== Points awarded to Sweden ====
Points awarded to Sweden (Semi-final)
Score	Country
12 points	Denmark; Malta; Portugal
10 points	Finland; Iceland; Norway
8 points	Andorra; Ireland; Monaco
7 points	Estonia; Moldova; Poland; Slovenia; Spain
6 points	Armenia; Bosnia and Herzegovina; Israel; Romania; United Kingdom
5 points	Albania; Belarus; Belgium; Latvia; Lithuania
4 points	Bulgaria; Croatia; Germany; Netherlands; Serbia and Montenegro; Switzerland; Ukraine
3 points	Russia
2 points	Cyprus
1 point	Macedonia

Points awarded to Sweden (Final)
Score	Country
12 points	
10 points	Albania; Denmark; Norway
8 points	Andorra; Portugal
7 points	Estonia; Finland; Iceland; Ireland; Latvia; Poland; Slovenia
6 points	Armenia; Malta; Spain; Ukraine
5 points	Belarus; Belgium; Israel; Lithuania; Monaco; Romania
4 points	United Kingdom
3 points	Bosnia and Herzegovina; Croatia; France
2 points	Moldova; Russia; Switzerland
1 point	Macedonia; Serbia and Montenegro

==== Points awarded by Sweden ====
Points awarded by Sweden (Semi-final)
Score	Country
12 points	Finland
10 points	Bosnia and Herzegovina
8 points	Estonia
7 points	Russia
6 points	Iceland
5 points	Belgium
4 points	Lithuania
3 points	Armenia
2 points	Albania
1 point	Ireland

Points awarded by Sweden (Final)
Score	Country
12 points	Finland
10 points	Bosnia and Herzegovina
8 points	Denmark
7 points	Russia
6 points	Romania
5 points	Ireland
4 points	Greece
3 points	Lithuania
2 points	Norway
1 point	Ukraine
