= Värsta schlagern =

2007 single by Linda Bengtzing

Single by Linda Bengtzing & Markoolio

from the album Vild & galen
- A-side: "Värsta schlagern"
- B-side: "Värsta schlagern" (karaoke version)
- Released: 31 January 2007
- Recorded: 2007
- Genre: Schlager
- Label: Sony BMG Music Entertainment
- Songwriter(s): Patrik Henzel, Karl Eurén, Niclas Arn, Gustav Eurén

Linda Bengtzing singles chronology
"Kan du se?" (2006)	"Värsta schlagern" (2007)	"Hur svårt kan det va?" (2008)

Värsta schlagern (English: The worst hit) is a song by Linda Bengtzing and Markoolio. It was written by Patrik Henzel, Karl Eurenor, Gustav Eurenor and Niclas Arn. It was released as a single in Sweden on 31 January 2007 reaching number one on the Swedish Singles Chart.

The song is a parody about songs that participate in the Swedish heat of the Eurovision Song Contest, Melodifestivalen, earlier often referred to as schlager. The lyrics are pointing fun at lyrics that are generally associated with Melodifestivalen songs, for example references to the "winds and stars", and the song is also three minutes long, which is the general length of all Melodifestivalen songs. The song also includes the name of the band ABBA, explaining that most Melodifestivalen songs are copies of Abba.

The song was put forward to participate in Melodifestivalen 2006, with Shirley Clamp singing it. However, it was rejected. Even Jonas Gardell rejected performing it at Melodifestivalen 2007.

The song entered Svensktoppen on 11 February 2007, reaching #3. On 4 March 2007 it entered #1. Placed at #8 on 3 June 2007, the 17-week-long Svensktoppen visit finished.

== Music video ==
The music video is a general parody of the Melodifestivalen competition. A group of celebrities, mimicked by Markoolio and other impersonators, sit in a room watching the television. The celebrities are ones who are either referenced in the song, or the song is aimed at. For example, singers who are related to Melodifestivalen, such as Carola and BWO.

== Charts ==
=== Weekly charts ===
Chart (2007)	Peak position
Sweden (Sverigetopplistan)	1

=== Year-end charts ===
Chart (2007)	Position
Sweden (Sverigetopplistan)	1
