= Devil in the Details =

Devil in the Details or Devil in the Detail may refer to:

- The Devil is in the detail, idiom
- Devil in the Details (Saigon Kick album), 1995
- Devil in the Details (The Poodles album), 2015
- Devil in the Details (band), metal band from Omaha
- Devil in the Detail (film), 2014 Ghanaian-Nigerian film
- "The Devil is in the Details... and the Upstairs Bedroom", episodes 4 of the fourth season of Psych
