= Sweet Trade =

Studio album by The Poodles
- Released: 19 September 2007
- Genre: Hard rock
- Length: 49:38
- Label: Soulfood Music
- Producers: Johan Lyander, Matti Alfonzetti

The Poodles chronology
Metal Will Stand Tall (2006)	Sweet Trade (2007)	Clash of the Elements (2009)

Sweet Trade is the second studio album by Swedish rock band The Poodles, released in 2007.

== Track listing ==
No.	Title	Writer(s)	Length
1.	"Flesh and Blood"	Jakob Samuel/Johan Lyander/Matti Alfonzetti/Per Hed/Staffan Westfält	3:09
2.	"Streets of Fire"	Samuel/Hal Johnston/Jonas Reingold	3:23
3.	"Seven Seas"	Samuel/Reingold/Peter Stormare	3:24
4.	"Walk the Line"	Samuel/Mats Berntoft	3:24
5.	"Thunderball"	Mats Levén	3:49
6.	"Reach the Sky"	Samuel/Reingold	3:10
7.	"We Are One"	Samuel/Thomas Gustafsson/Tobbe Petersson	3:09
8.	"Without You"	Samuel/Berntoft	3:23
9.	"Band of Brothers"	Samuel/Pontus Norgren/Chris Goldsmith	4:29
10.	"Heaven's Closing In"	Samuel/Calle Kindbom/Linda Holberg/Mats Johansson	3:40
11.	"Kiss Goodbye"	Samuel/Norgren	4:29
12.	"Shine"	Samuel/Pontus Egberg	3:41

2008 re-release bonus tracks
No.	Title	Writer(s)	Length
2.	"Line of Fire"	Samuel/E-Type	2:57
3.	"Raise the Banner"	Samuel/Jonas Lengstrand/Kristian Lagerström	3:01

Japanese edition bonus track
No.	Title	Writer(s)	Length
13.	"Flesh and Blood (Live Version)"	Samuel/Lyander/Alfonzetti/Hed/Westfält	3:40
