= The Name of Love =

Single by Magnus Bäcklund
- Released: March 13, 2006
- Recorded: rock
- Label: M&L Records
- Songwriters: Lina Eriksson; Mårten Eriksson

Magnus Bäcklund singles chronology
"The Name of Love" (2006)	"Say Your Goodbye" (2006)

The Name of Love is a song written by Lina Eriksson and Mårten Eriksson, and performed by Magnus Bäcklund at the Swedish Melodifestivalen 2006. Reaching the finals through Andra chansen, the song ended up 5th with 68 points, where 11 came from the telephone voters.

== Single ==
At the Swedish singles chart, it peaked at 6th position. The song also reached Svensktoppen where it stayed for one week, a 9th position on 14 May 2006 before leaving the chart.

== Single track listing ==
1. The Name of Love (original version) - 3:06
2. The Name of Love (singback version) - 3:03

== Charts ==
Chart (1993)	Peak position
Sweden (Sverigetopplistan)	6
