= Clash of the Elements =

Studio album by The Poodles
- Released: 20 May 2009
- Genre: Hard rock
- Length: 56:48
- Label: Lionheart International
- Producer: Mats Valentin

The Poodles chronology
Sweet Trade (2007)	Clash of the Elements (2009)	Performocracy (2011)

Clash of the Elements Is the third studio album of Swedish rock band The Poodles, released 20 May 2009. It was the first album with new guitarist Henrik Bergqvist, who replaced Pontus Norgren after he quit the band to play with Hammerfall.

== Track listing ==
No.	Title	Writer(s)	Length
1.	"Too Much of Everything"	Jakob Samuel/Mats Valentin	4:56
2.	"Caroline"	Samuel/Per Aldeheim	3:47
3.	"Like No Tomorrow"	Samuel/Fredrik Thomander/Anders Wikström	3:24
4.	"One out of Ten"	Samuel/Nicolo Fragile	3:49
5.	"I Rule the Night"	Samuel/Jonas Reingold/Hal Johnson	4:07
6.	"Give Me a Sign"	Samuel/Matti Alfonzetti/Johan Lyander	3:36
7.	"Sweet Enemy"	Samuel/Alfonzetti/Lyander	4:48
8.	"7 Days & 7 Nights"	Rob Wells	3:59
9.	"Pilot of the Storm"	Samuel/Fragile	3:52
10.	"Can't Let You Go"	Samuel	4:03
11.	"Don't Rescue Me"	Samuel/Pontus Egberg/Henrik Bergqvist	4:09
12.	"Heart of Gold"	Samuel/Valentin	4:24
13.	"Dream to Follow"	Samuel/Valentin	3:41
14.	"Wings of Destiny"	Samuel/Valentin	4:13

Japanese Version Bonus Tracks
No.	Title	Writer(s)	Length
15.	"I Rule the Night (Acoustic Version)"	Samuel/Reingold/Johnson	3:57
16.	"I Rule the Night (Live Version)"	Samuel/Reingold/Johnson	4:07

== Personnel ==
- Jakob Samuel - lead vocals
- Pontus Egberg - bass guitar, backing vocals
- Christian Lundqvist - drums
- Henrik Bergqvist - guitars

== Charts ==
=== Weekly charts ===
Chart (2009)	Peak position
Swedish Albums (Sverigetopplistan)	5

=== Year-end charts ===
Chart (2009)	Position
Swedish Albums (Sverigetopplistan)	98
