= Laila Adèle =

Swedish singer (born 1978)

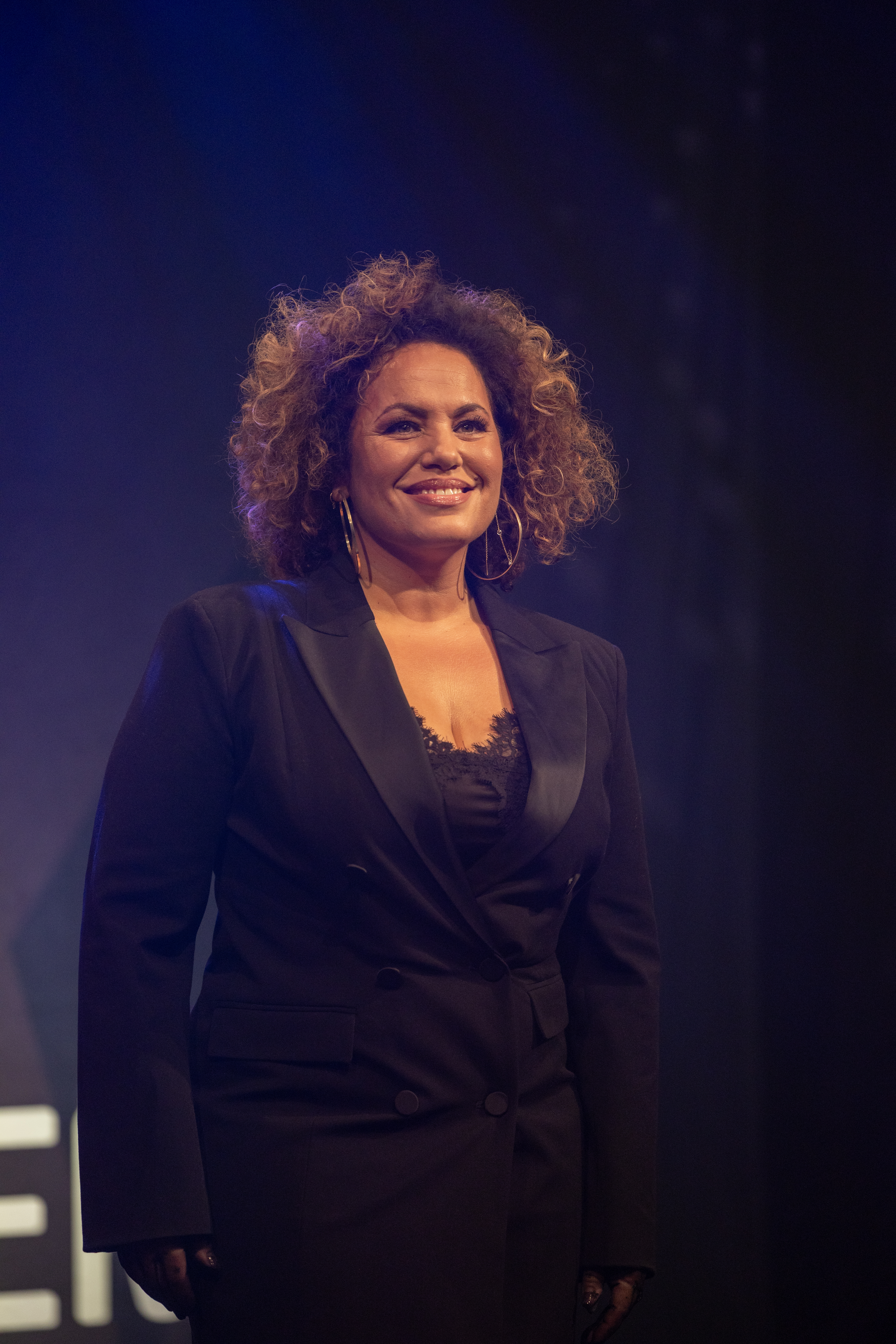
- Laila Adèle

Background information
- Born: Laila Adèle Chrona; 16 February 1978 (age 48); Fez, Morocco
- Genres: Musical, Soul
- Occupation: Singer

Laila Adèle Chrona, known professionally as Laila Adèle (born 16 February 1978), is a Swedish singer.

== Life and career ==
She was born in Morocco and was adopted. She grew up in Bromma.

She performed in Melodifestivalen 2006 with the song "Don't Try to Stop Me". Adèle has had several roles in musicals, like in her debut in the year 2007 in the musical Little Shop of Horrors at Halmstad teater, Slagthuset in Malmö and the musical also visited the Lorensbergsteatern in Gothenburg the cast also consisted of Jessica Andersson, Sven Melander, Thomas Petersson and Mikael Tornving. As well as roles in ”Hairspray” at Chinateatern in Stockholm, and Jekyll & Hyde at the Malmö Opera. She was a contestant on Idol 2008, making it to the final audition. The show was broadcast on TV4. In 2024, she played Effie White in a Chinateatern production of Dreamgirls.

She performed the song "Oxygen" in Melodifestivalen 2026.

== Discography ==
=== Singles ===
Title	Year	Peak chart positions	Album
Title	Year	SWE	Album
"Oxygen"	2026	68	Non-album single
