= Hur svårt kan det va? =

Single by Linda Bengtzing

from the album Vild & galen
- A-side: "Hur svårt kan det va?" (original version)
- B-side: "Hur svårt kan det va?" (instrumental version)
- Released: 9 March 2008
- Genre: schlager
- Label: M&L Records
- Songwriters: Johan Fransson, Tim Larsson and Tobias Lundgren

Linda Bengtzing singles chronology
""Värsta schlagern" (with Markoolio)" (2007)	"Hur svårt kan det va?" (2008)

"Hur svårt kan det va?" is a song written by Johan Fransson, Tim Larsson and Tobias Lundgren, and originally performed by Linda Bengtzing in the fourth semifinal of Melodifestivalen 2008 in Karlskrona on 1 March of that year. The song headed directly to the final at the Stockholm Globe Arena, and subsequently achieved fifth place.

On 27 April 2008, the song entered Svensktoppen, where it ended up peaking at number nine. The following week, the song had been knocked out of the chart.

The single was released on 9 March 2008, and peaked at number 3 on the Swedish singles chart.

== Single track listing ==
1. Hur svårt kan det va (original)
2. Hur svårt kan det va (instrumental)

== Charts ==
Chart (2008)	Peak position
Sweden (Sverigetopplistan)	3
