= Ingenting att förlora =

Studio album by Linda Bengtzing
- Released: March 13, 2006
- Recorded: 2005–2006 in Sweden
- Genre: Pop, Pop/Rock, Schlager
- Label: Mariann Records

Linda Bengtzing chronology
Ingenting att förlora (2006)	Vild & galen (2008)

Ingenting att förlora (Nothing to lose) is the debut studio album by Swedish pop singer Linda Bengtzing and was released on March 13, 2006. The album peaked at number 34 on the Swedish albums chart.

== Track listing ==
1. Ingenting att förlora
2. Jag ljuger så bra
3. Kan du se?
4. Himlen är du
5. Medan du sov
6. Alla flickor
7. Han är min
8. Ett ögonblick
9. Vad hände sen? (What's Going On)
10. Diamanter
11. Vem?
12. Nu kommer jag tillbaks
13. Ingenting är större (duet with Pontus Assarsson)

== Singles ==
- Alla flickor (2005)
- Diamanter (2005)
- Jag ljuger så bra (2006)
- Kan du se? (2006)

== Charts ==
=== Weekly charts ===
Chart (2006)	Peak position
Swedish Albums (Sverigetopplistan)	4

=== Year-end charts ===
Chart (2006)	Position
Swedish Albums (Sverigetopplistan)	77
