= Björn Kjellman =

Swedish actor and singer (born 1963)

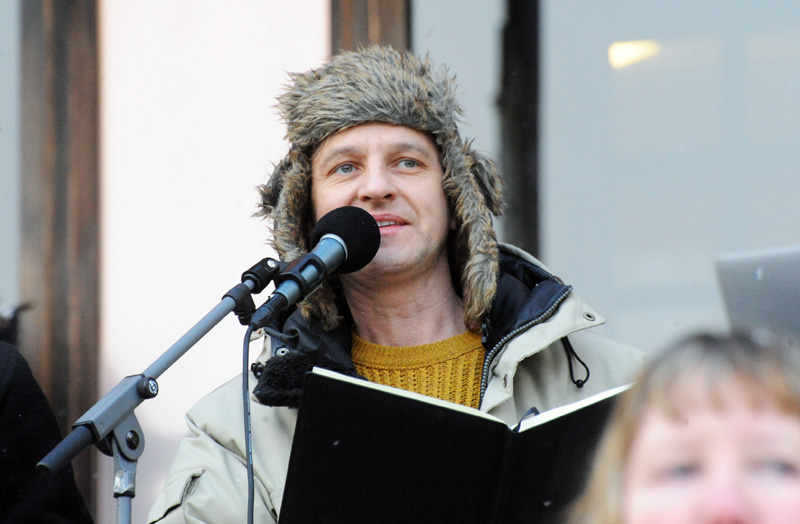
- Kjellman in August 2017
- Born: John Björn Sture Kjellman; 4 June 1963 (age 63); Östra Grevie, Sweden
- Occupations: Actor; singer
- Years active: 1985–present
- Spouse: Kajsa Aronsson
- Children: 4

John Björn Sture Kjellman (born 4 June 1963) is a Swedish actor and singer.

Kjellman was born in Östra Grevie, Scania. He played roles in Swedish movies such as Adam & Eva, Klassfesten and Livet är en schlager, in which he plays a Melodifestivalen-obsessed transvestite who is brother to Helena Bergström's character, who takes part in the Swedish Melodifestivalen in the movie.

Kjellman participated in Melodifestivalen 2006 with the song "Älskar du livet", and reached the final where it ended up 9th.

He played the iconic Pelle in SVT 1997 Julkalender ”Pelle Svanslös”.

He took part in Stjärnorna på slottet in 2020, broadcast on SVT.

== Selected filmography ==
- The Guardian Angel (1990)
- Pelle Svanslös (1997)
- Adam & Eva (1997)
- Vägen ut (1999)
- Livet är en schlager (2000)
- As White as in Snow (2001)
- Klassfesten (2002)
- Behind Blue Skies (2010)
- Nobel's Last Will (2012)
- Fallet (2017)
