= Metal Will Stand Tall =

Studio album by The Poodles
- Released: 10 May 2006
- Genre: Hard rock
- Length: 42:51
- Label: Lionheart International
- Producers: Matti Alfonzetti & Johan Lyander

The Poodles chronology
Metal Will Stand Tall (2006)	Sweet Trade (2007)

Professional ratings
Review scores
Source	Rating
Degeneracion Rock	4.5/5 stars

Metal Will Stand Tall is the debut studio album by Swedish rock band The Poodles, released in 2006. The list of guest musicians and co-songwriters are Holly Knight, Mats Levén, Tommy Denader, Jonas Reingold and Marcel Jacob.

== Track listing ==
No.	Title	Writer(s)	Length
1.	"Echoes from the Past"	Jakob Samuel/Pontus Norgren/Chris Goldsmith	4:10
2.	"Metal Will Stand Tall"	Samuel/Jonas Reingold	3:21
3.	"Night of Passion"	Robert Olausson/Sonja Aldén/Matti Alfonzetti/Johan Lyander	2:59
4.	"Song for You"	Samuel	4:43
5.	"Shadows"	Young/Aleena Gibson/Olausson	3:01
6.	"Lie to Me"	Tommy Denander/Holly Knight	3:33
7.	"Rockstar"	Anders Fästader/Göran Elmquist	3:22
8.	"Dancing with Tears in My Eyes"	Midge Ure/Billy Currie/Chris Cross/Warren Cann	3:36
9.	"Don't Give Up on Love"	Alfonzetti/Lyander	3:46
10.	"Number One"	Fästader/Elmquist	3:14
11.	"Kingdom of Heaven"	Samuel/Marcel Jacob	3:12
12.	"Crying"	Young/Samuel	3:54

Japanese edition bonus track
No.	Title	Writer(s)	Length
13.	"Night of Passion (Acoustic version)"	Olausson/Aldén/Alfonzetti/Lyander	3:56

2007 digipak edition bonus tracks
No.	Title	Writer(s)	Length
13.	"Night of Passion (Radio Mix)"	Olausson/Aldén/Alfonzetti/Lyander	3:01
14.	"Echoes from the Past (Live from Sweden Rock 2006)"	Samuel/Norgren/Goldsmith	4:43
15.	"Song for You (Live from Sweden Rock 2006)"	Samuel	6:34

- "Dancing with Tears in My Eyes" is an Ultravox' cover

== Personnel ==
- Jakob Samuel – lead vocals
- Pontus Norgren – guitars, backing vocals
- Pontus Egberg – bass guitar, backing vocals
- Christian "Kicken" Lundqvist – drums
- Johan Lyander – keyboards, recording, mixing, producer, arrangements
- Matti Alfonzetti – backing vocals, recording, mixing, producer, arrangements
- Tess Merkel – vocals on "Metal Will Stand Tall"
- Jonas Nerbe Samuelsson – vocals on "Song for You"
- Anders Fästader – additional bass guitar on "Night of Passion"

== Charts ==
=== Weekly charts ===
Chart (2006)	Peak position
Swedish Albums (Sverigetopplistan)	4

=== Year-end charts ===
Chart (2006)	Position
Swedish Albums (Sverigetopplistan)	58
