= Devil in the Details (The Poodles album) =

Studio album by The Poodles
- Released: March 24, 2015
- Genre: Hard rock

The Poodles chronology
Tour De Force (2013)	Devil in the Details (2015)

Devil in the Details is the sixth studio album by the Swedish rock band The Poodles released on 24 March 2015, marking a new collaboration with the Swedish label Gain Music. The first single off the album was "The Greatest", pre-released on 19 January 2015.

== Track listing ==
1. "Before I Die" (4:24)
2. "House of Cards" (4:24)
3. "The Greatest" (3:53)
4. "Crack in the Wall" (3:54)
5. "(What the Hell) Baby" (3:15)
6. "Everything" (3:05)
7. "Stop" (3:06)
8. "Need to Believe" (4:10)
9. "Alive" (3:31)
10. "Life Without You" (4:05)
11. "Creator and Breaker" (3:41)
12. "Borderline" (4:10)

== Charts ==
Chart (2015)	Peak position
Swedish Albums (Sverigetopplistan)	27
