= En droppe regn =

Single by Niclas Wahlgren
- A-side: "En droppe regn"
- Released: March 2006
- Genre: pop
- Label: M&L Records
- Songwriters: Ingela "Pling" Forsman, Bobby Ljunggren, Henrik Wikström

Niclas Wahlgren singles chronology
"Jag skall ge dig en himmel" (2005)	"En droppe regn" (2006)	"Du är den" (2006)

"En droppe regn" is a song written by Ingela "Pling" Forsman, Bobby Ljunggren and Henrik Wikström, and performed by Niclas Wahlgren at Melodifestivalen 2006, where it went further to Andra chansen before getting knocked out.

The song received a Svensktoppen test on 14 May 2006, but failed to chart.

== Charts ==
Chart (2006)	Peak position
Sweden (Sverigetopplistan)	55
