= Magnus Bäcklund (singer) =

Swedish singer

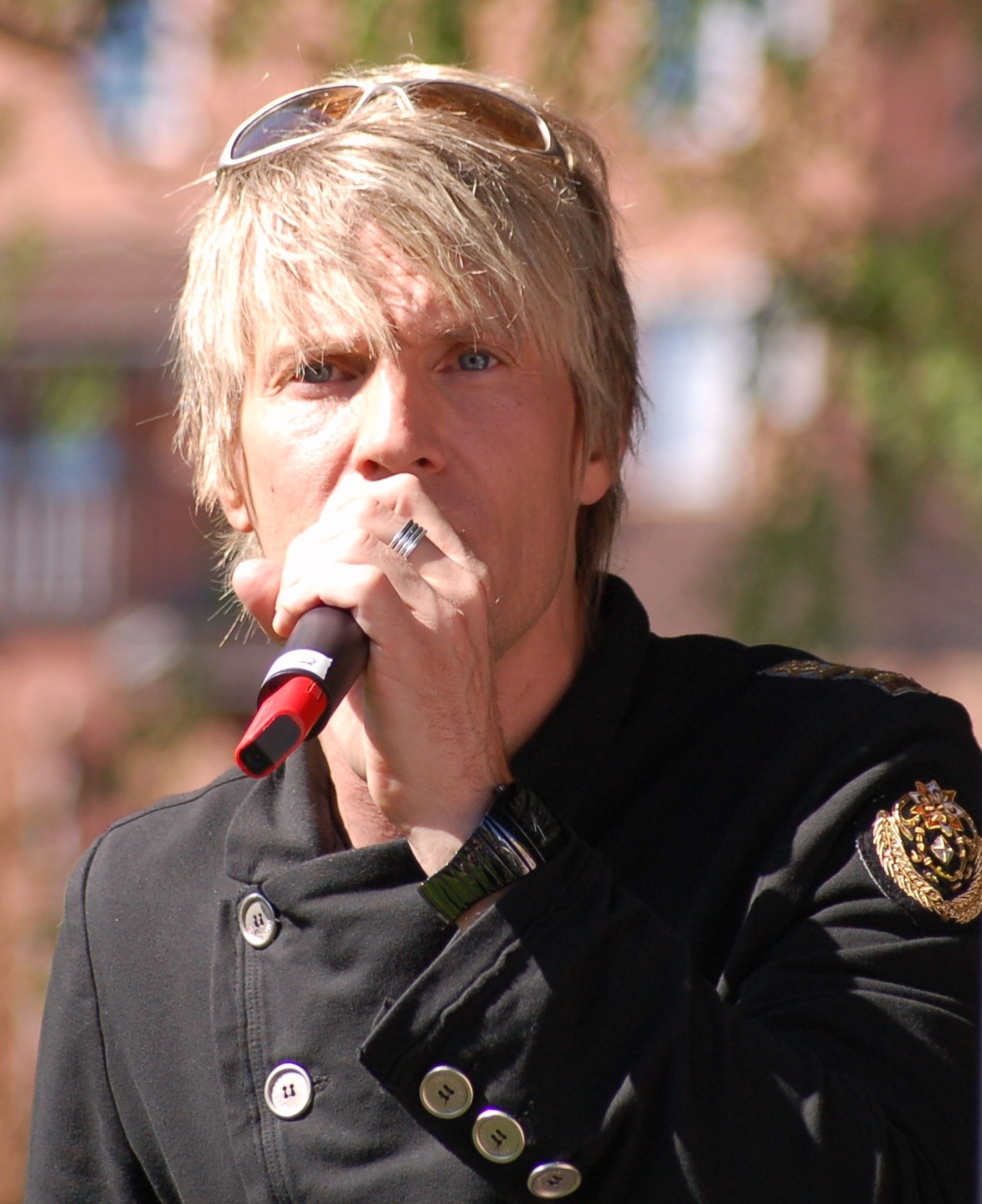
- Magnus Bäcklund (Norrköping, 2006)

Background information
- Born: Magnus Bäcklund; 16 November 1965 (age 60); Kristinehamn, Värmland, Sweden
- Genres: Pop
- Years active: 2003 – present
- Formerly of: Fame
- Website: www.magnusbacklund.com

Magnus Bäcklund (born 16 November 1965 in Kristinehamn, Värmland, Sweden) is a Swedish singer. He was part of the Swedish duo Fame with Jessica Andersson between 2002 and 2006 after they met at the reality television show Fame Factory. After the breakup of the band, he developed a solo singing career, releasing an album Never Say Never in 2006 immediately after the break-up.

== Beginnings in Fame Factory ==
He gained fame after taking part in the 2002 series of the television show Fame Factory which he won. The Swedish record manager Bert Karlsson proposed to put him in a duo with another Fame participant Jessica Andersson. The duo was called Fame.

== In Fame ==
Fame was formed in 2003 and under that banner, he took part in 2003 in Melodifestivalen under the name Fame, with the "Give Me Your Love" that earned favour with the Swedish public and the jury winning in a landslide victory in Melodifestivalen 2003 at the Stockholm Globe Arena. They went on to participate in the Eurovision Song Contest, eventually garnering 107 points, which put them in fifth place.

With Eurovision success, Fame put up a full studio album also titled Give Me Your Love. It included 14 tracks, 11 in English and 3 in Swedish. The track list had 8 songs performed by the duo, 4 solo tracks by Jessica Andersson herself (i.e. "Ett kort ögonblick", "Single Girl", "Anyway You Want It" and "Säg att du stannar kvar") and 2 solo tracks by Magnus Bäcklund

In 2004, Fame tried yet again for Melodifestivalen 2004, this time with "Vindarna vänder oss" ("The Winds Turn Us"), finishing just sixth overall. Fame folded in 2006, with both continuing with solo careers.

== Solo career ==
As a solo act, he took part in Melodifestivalen 2006 with the song "The Name of Love" appearing in the first semi-final on 18 February 2006, and earned a place in "Andra Chansen" (literally a "second chance") held on 12 March 2006, that allowed him a showing in the finals. Andersson was taking part with another song, but failed to make it to the finals. Bäcklund's song finished fifth overall that year. It also charted in Sverigetopplistan, the official Swedish Singles Chart reaching number 6. Magnus Bäcklund capitalizing on his showing in the final released his album Never Say Never in 2006 that included "The Name of Love".

Bäcklund took part in Eskilstunarevyn that premiered beginning of 2007 and lasted for a few months. On 16 February 2007, he released a single "Burn" featuring Linda Lampenius that became his biggest success reaching number 4 in the Swedish charts.

In 2007 he performed at Cirkus in Stockholm with Robert Wells' show Rhapsody in Rock.

He was a television celebrity in the Swedish game show Så ska det låta (meaning That's the spirit) based on the Irish show The Lyrics Board. In 2008 he competed against Molly Sandén on the show and in 2010, with Linda Bengtzing.

In summer 2009, he toured with the band Thunderballs and Tom Jones in the show The Hitstory. He also took part in the Göteborg Culture Festival.

== Personal life ==
Bäcklund works part time as a commercial pilot in the airline NextJet.

== Discography ==
=== Albums ===
Year	Album	Peak positions
Year	Album	SWE
2006	Never Say Never	32

=== Singles ===
Year	Single	Peak positions	Certification	Album
Year	Single	SWE	Certification	Album
2003	"Higher"	43		Non-album release (Fame Factory performance)
2006	"The Name of Love"	6		From his album Never Say Never; Melodifestivalen 2006 performance
2007	"Burn" (feat. Linda Lampenius)	4		
