= Älskar du livet =

Single by Björn Kjellman
- A-side: "Älskar du livet"
- Released: March 2006
- Genre: chanson, schlager
- Label: M&L Records
- Songwriters: Calle Kindbom; Dan Fernström
- Producer: Andreas Rickstrand

"Älskar du livet" is a song written by Anders Glenmark and Niklas Strömstedt, and performed by Björn Kjellman at Melodifestivalen 2006, where it progressed from the semifinal in Gothenburg to the final at the Stockholm Globe Arena. It finished ninth in the final.

The song became a Svensktoppen hit, charting for 18 weeks between 30 April-27 August 2006, with four third-places as highest positions, before leaving the chart.

== Charts ==
Chart (2006)	Peak position
Sweden (Sverigetopplistan)	18
