= The Poodles =

Swedish hard rock band (2005-2018)

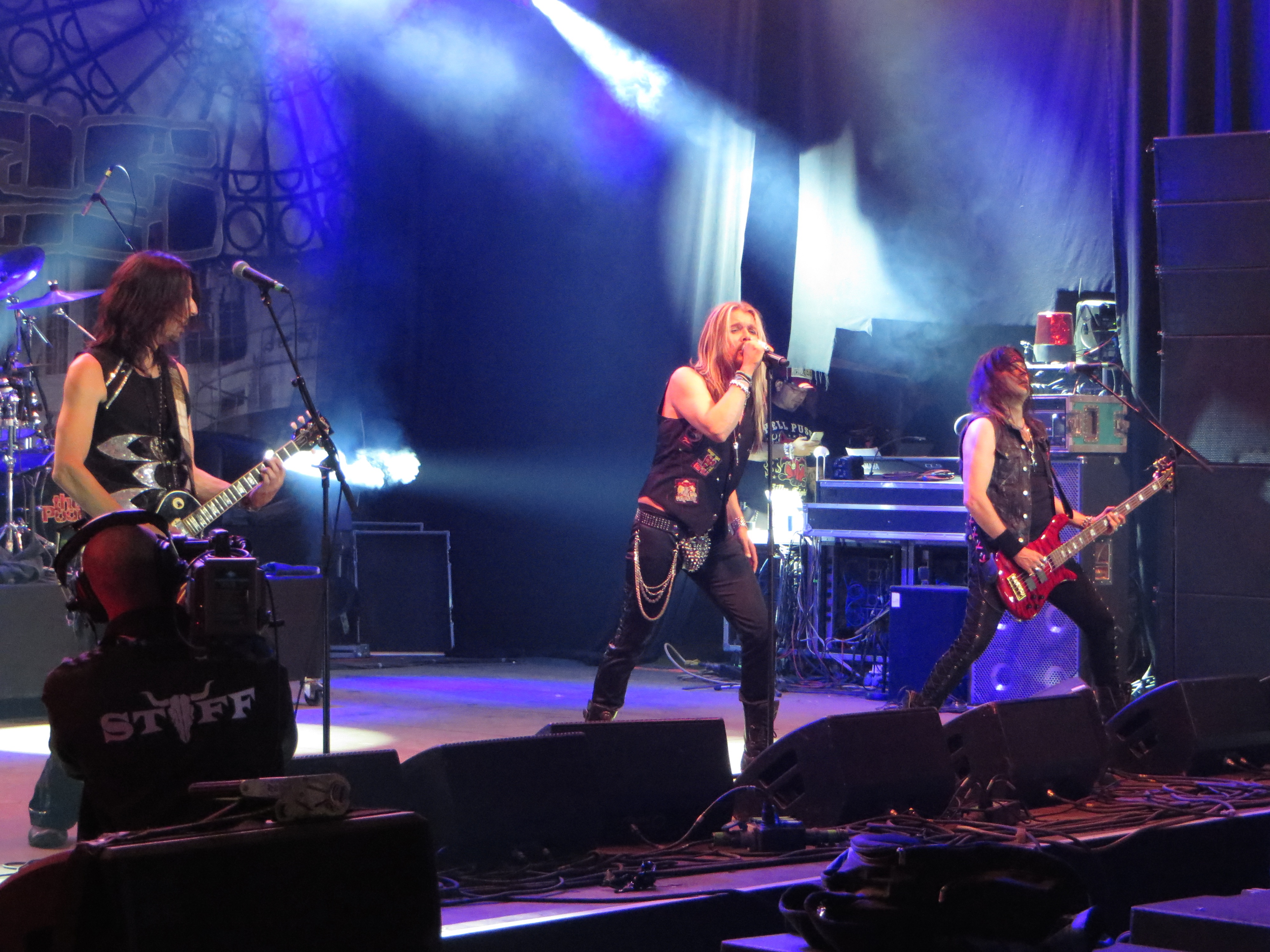
- The Poodles at Wacken Open Air 2015

Background information
- Origin: Sweden
- Genre: Hard rock
- Years active: 2005–2018
- Label: Frontiers
- Past members: Pontus Norgren; Pontus Egberg; Emil Lindroth; Kristian Hermansson; Jakob Samuel; Christian Lundqvist; Henrik Bergqvist; Johan Flodqvist

The Poodles were a Swedish hard rock band formed by singer Jakob Samuel (a.k.a. Jake Samuels), bass guitarist Pontus Egberg, guitarist Pontus Norgren, and drummer Christian Lundqvist. The band's songs include "Metal Will Stand Tall" and "Night of Passion", the latter of which was performed in 2006 in Melodifestivalen, the annual music competition to decide the Swedish entry to the Eurovision Song Contest. The Poodles performed in Melodifestivalen again in 2008, this time with the musician E-Type, and played at the Sweden Rock Festival in 2006 and 2008.

== History ==
Prior to the formation of The Poodles, Norgren and Samuel were members of Talisman and also played together in a The Lord of the Rings-themed power metal trio called The Ring. In 2006, Samuel was asked to sing the track "Night of Passion", and asked Lundqvist to join him as drummer for the session. Bass guitarist Egberg (formerly of Lion's Share) and Norgren subsequently joined them to perform the song as The Poodles.

The Poodles were one of ten finalists in Melodifestivalen 2006, and by the time of their performance had added Mats Levén, a friend of Samuel, on backing vocals. The band finished in fourth place and released a first album, Metal Will Stand Tall, in Sweden in May 2006. The band signed a deal with Germany's AFM Records and then released the album in the rest of Europe on 19 January 2007.

The single "Night of Passion" was certified platinum and a follow-up single, "Metal Will Stand Tall", a duet with Therese Merkel from the Swedish dance band Alcazar, was certified gold. The song "Kingdom of Heaven" was co-written by Samuel and Marcel Jacob.

The band made an initial selection based on 35 songs to be used for its second album. 12 tracks were chosen for this album, which was titled Sweet Trade, and it was released on 28 September 2007 by AFM Records. "Seven Seas", produced by Matti Alfonzetti and Johan Lyander, was selected as the first single. It was written by Samuel, Jonas Reingold and the actor Peter Stormare.

On 22 April 2008, Norgren left the band to join HammerFall and was replaced by Henrik Bergqvist.

On 22 October 2016, The Poodles appeared at the three-day Rockingham 2016 melodic/hard rock festival in Nottingham, United Kingdom.

In 2017, Samuel and Egberg were reunited in the project band Kryptonite, with the drummer Robban Bäck (Mustasch, ex-Eclipse) and the guitarist Mike Palace, recording an album for Frontier Records.

On 20 December 2018, the band announced that it would disband with immediate effect, due to other musical projects.

== Band members ==
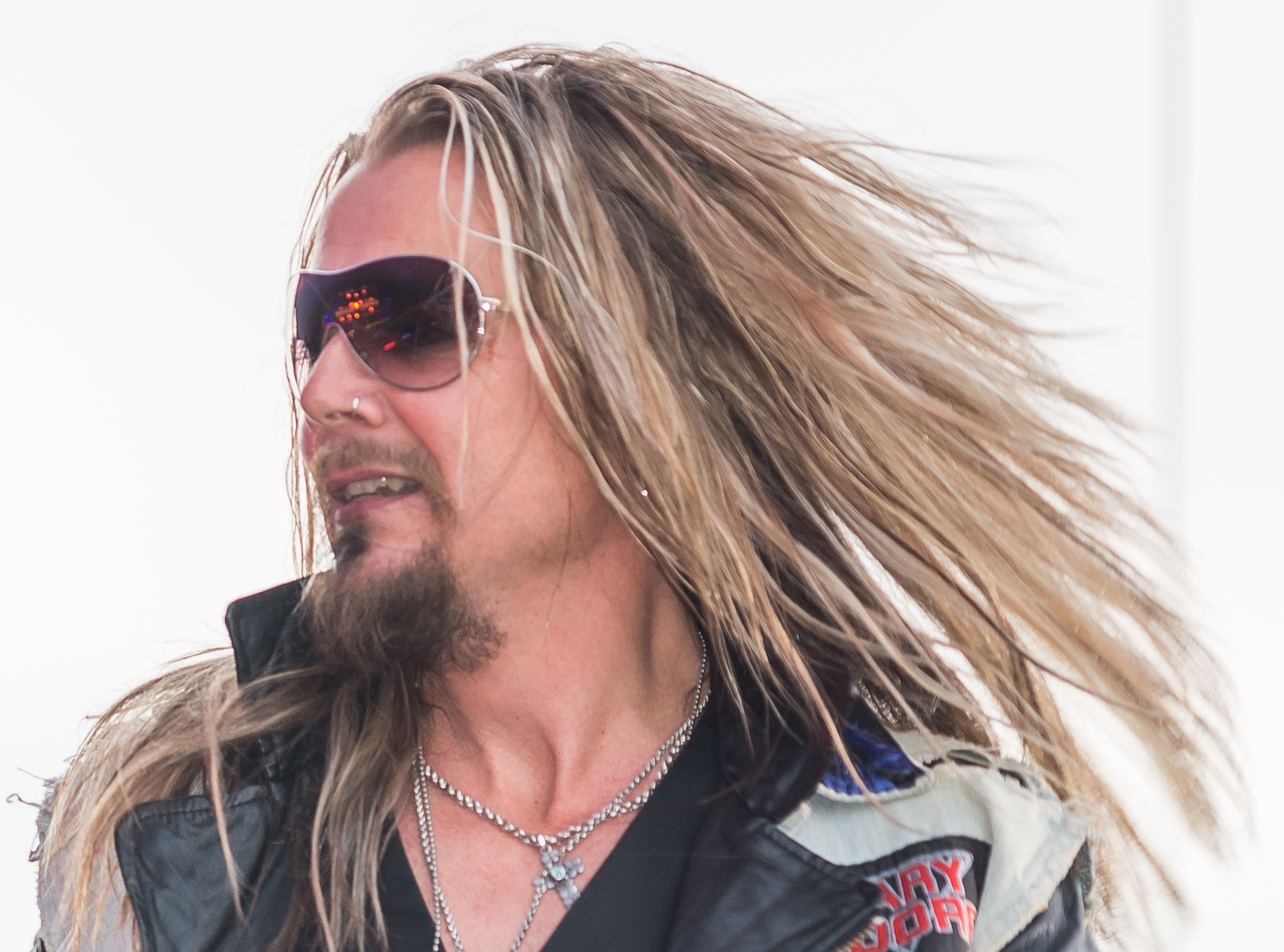
Jacob Samuel 2015

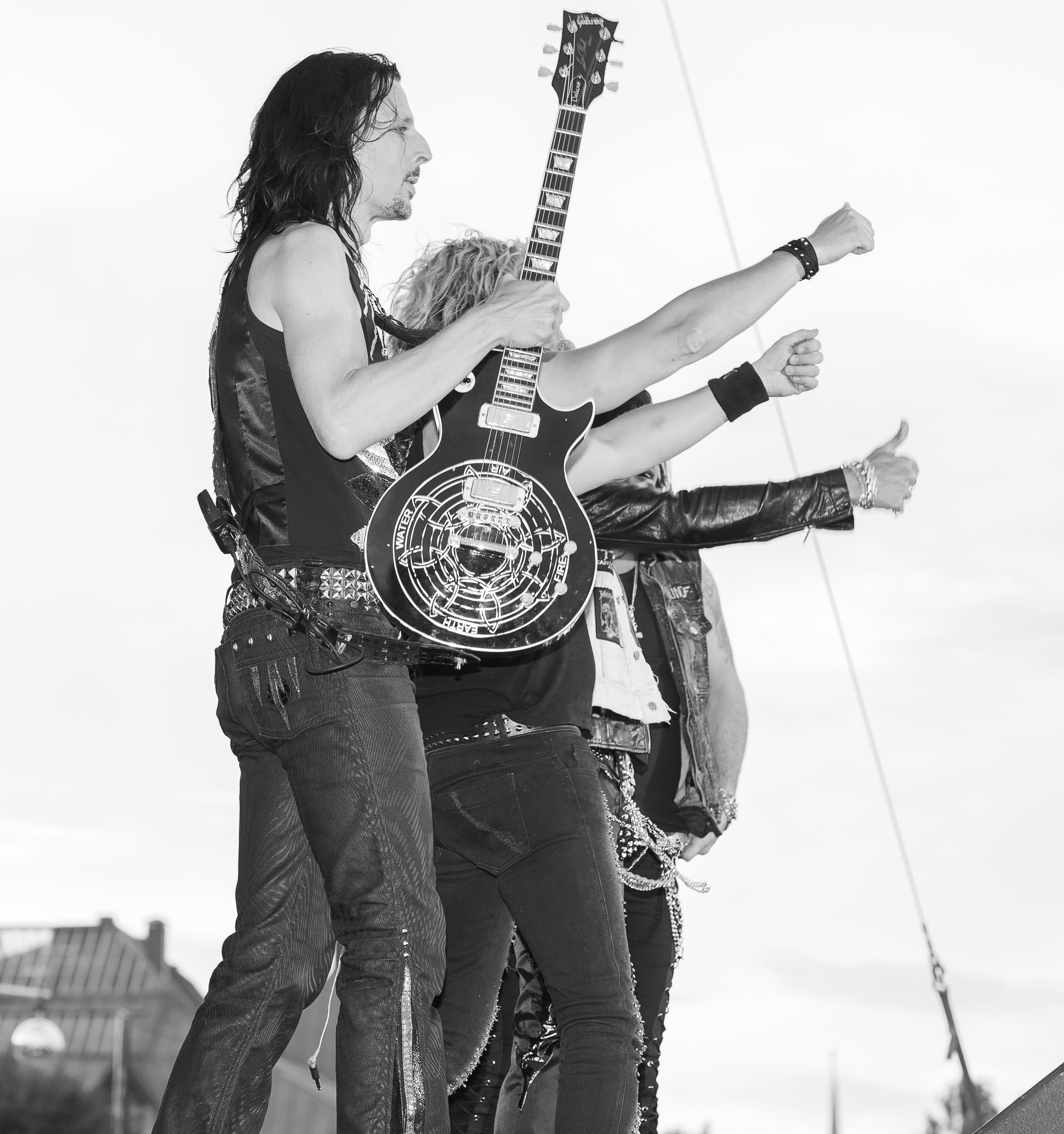
The Poodles 2015

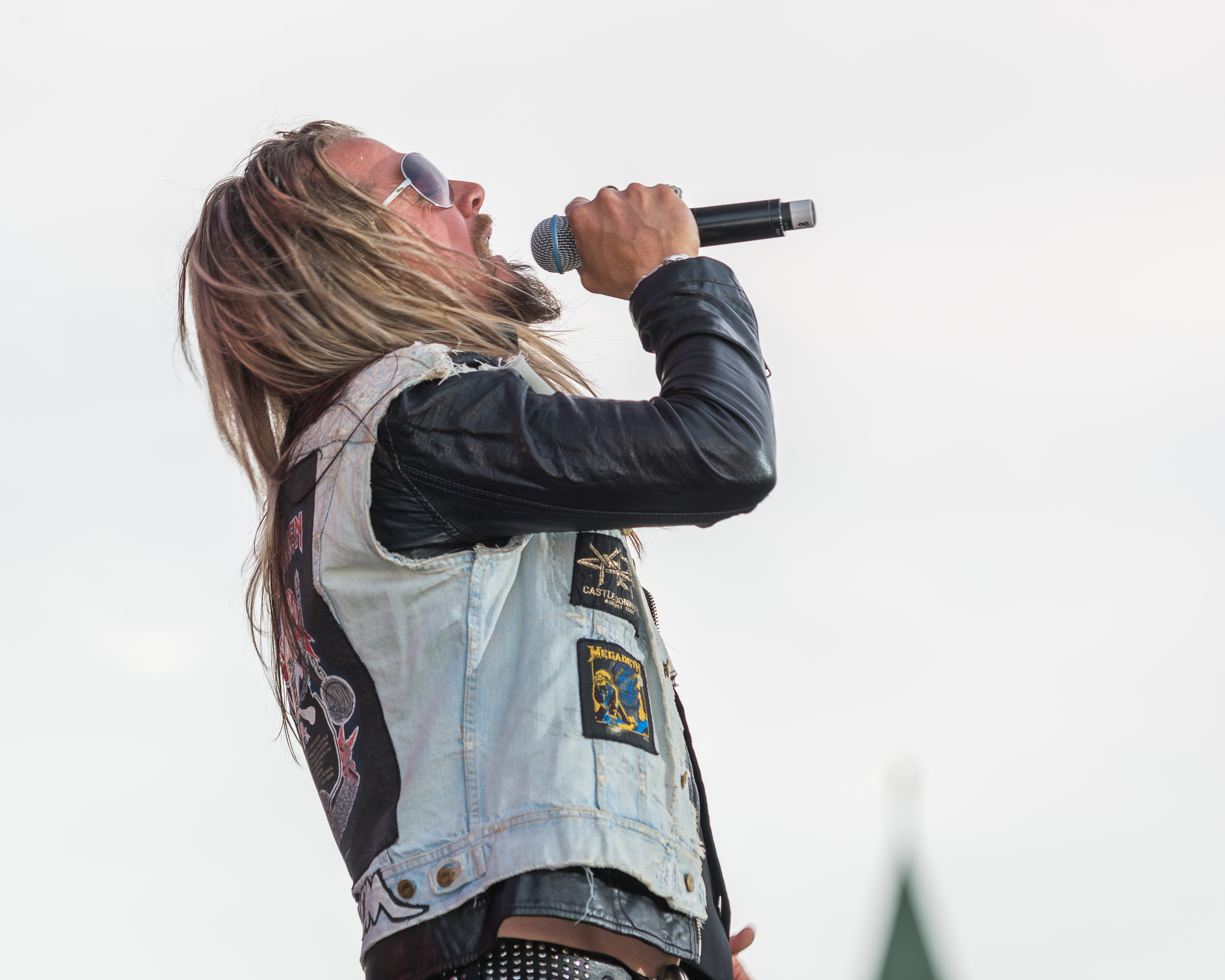
Jacob Samuel 2015

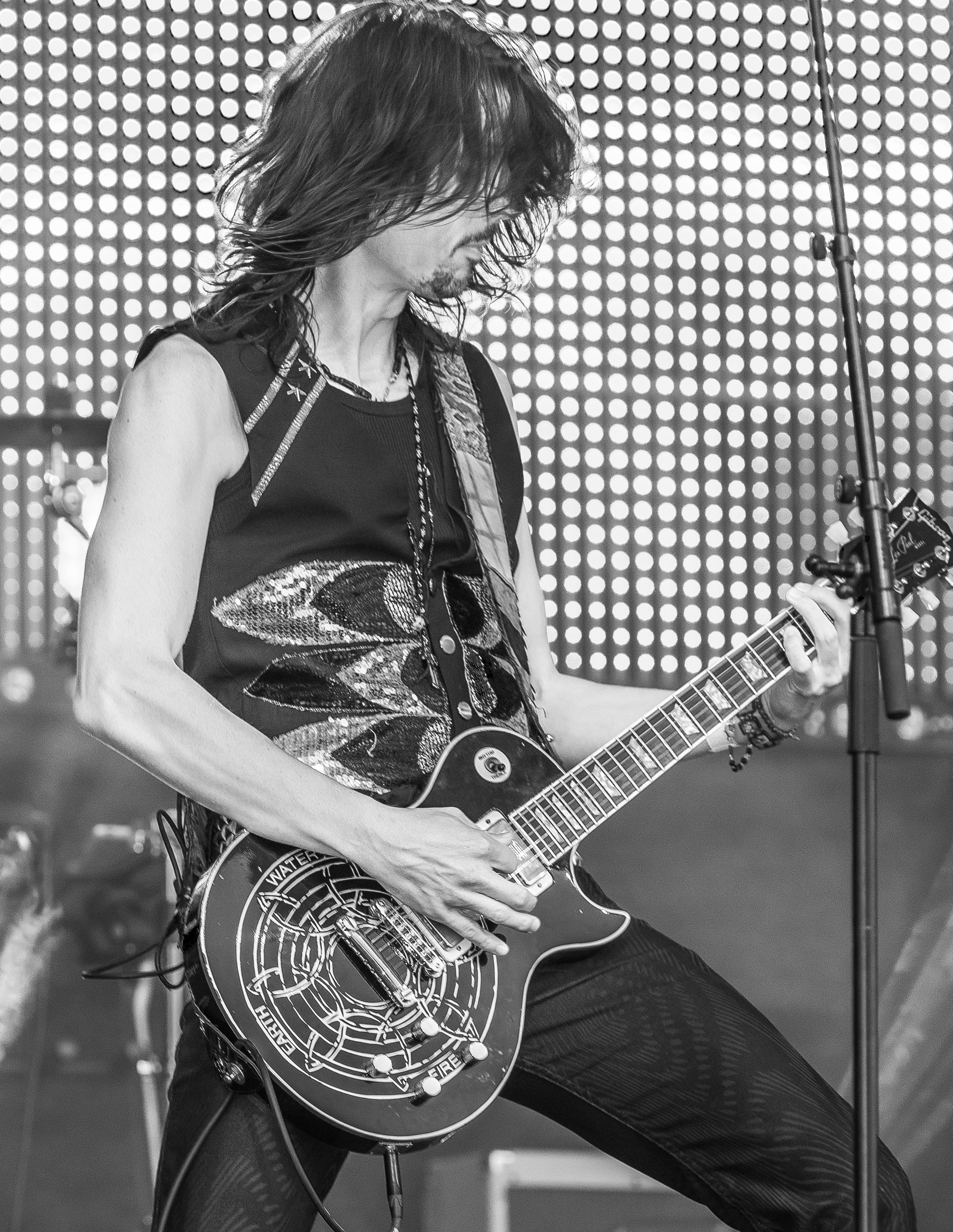
The Poodles 2015

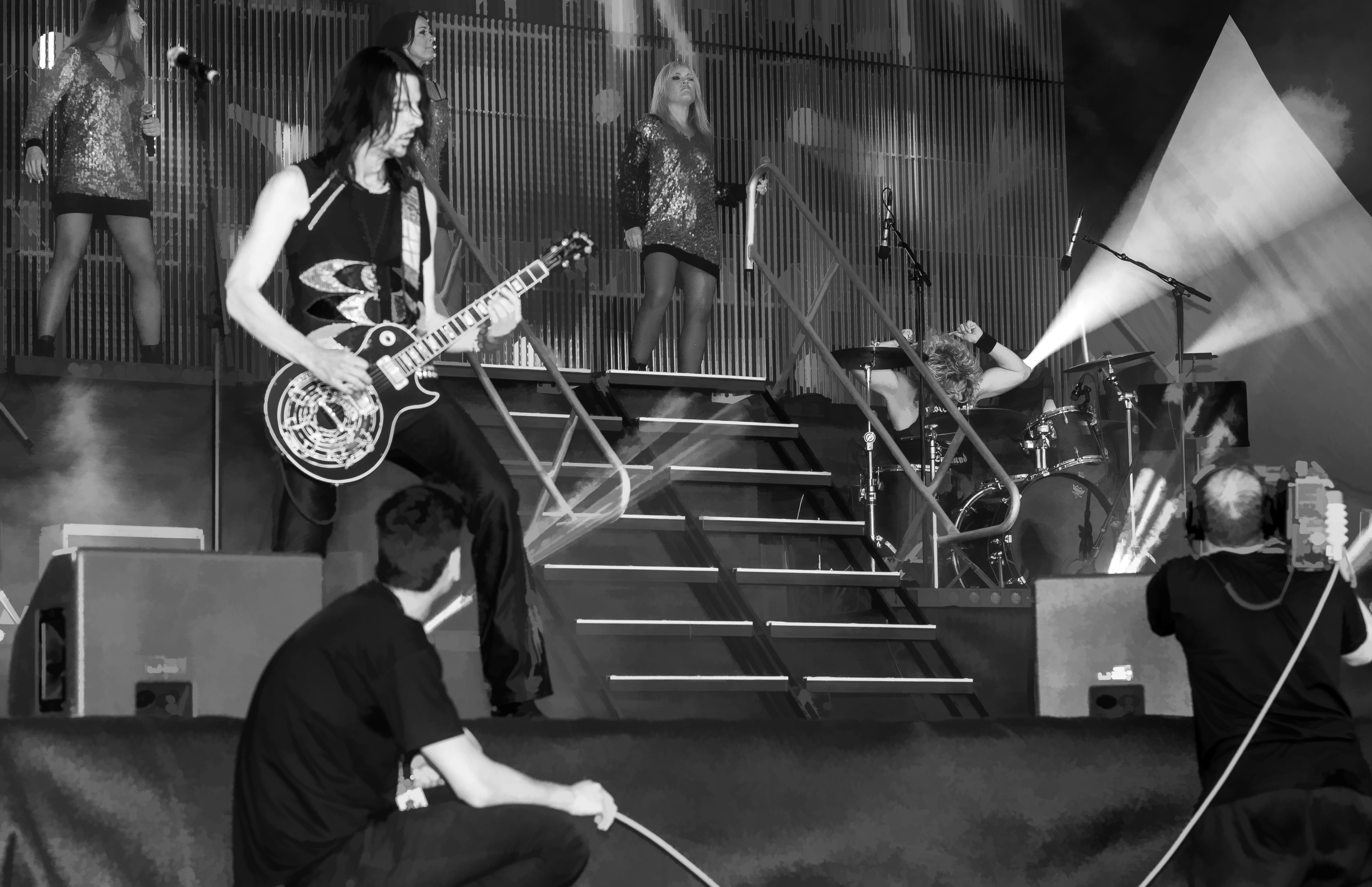
The Poodles 2015

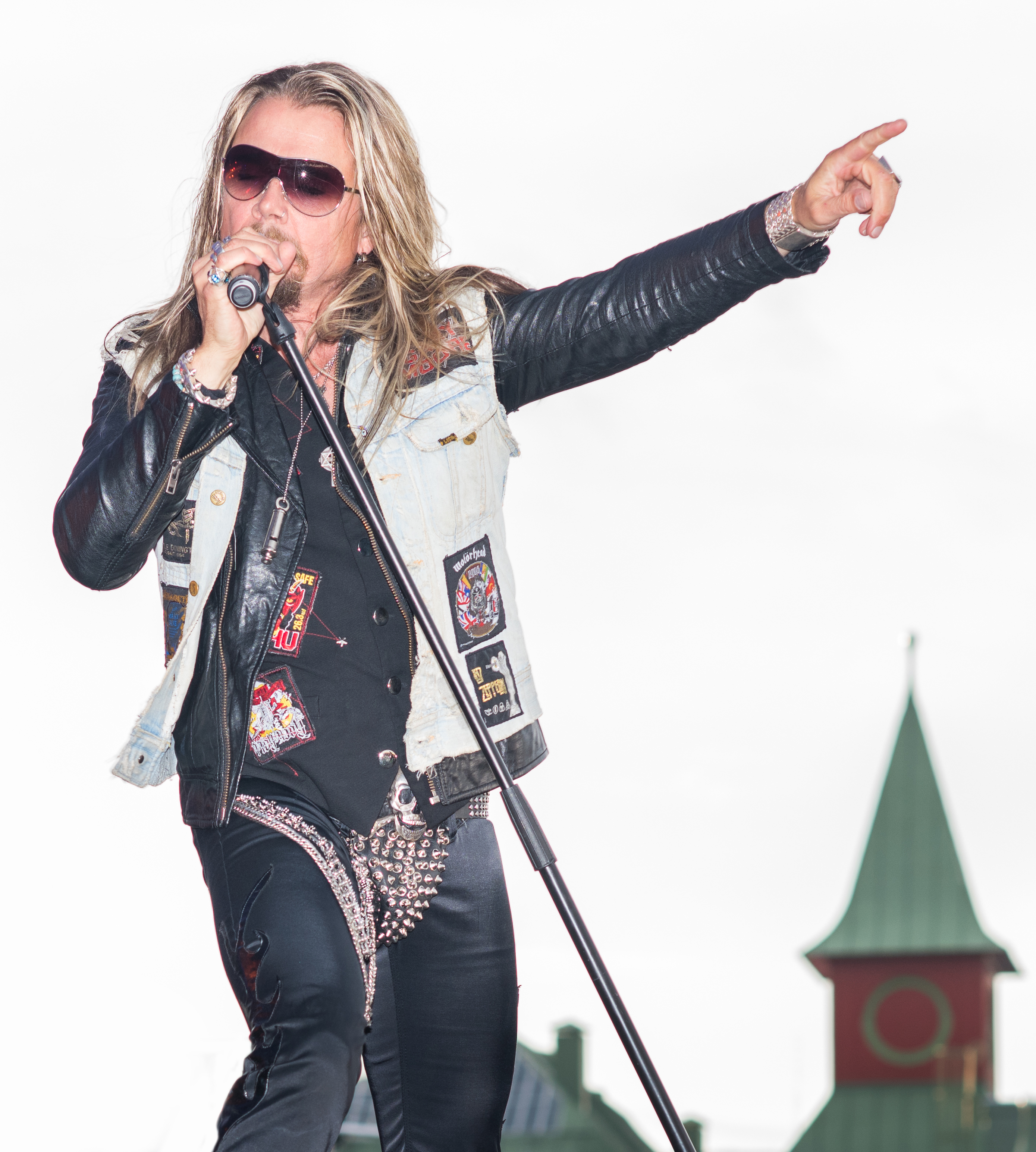
Jacob Samuel 2015

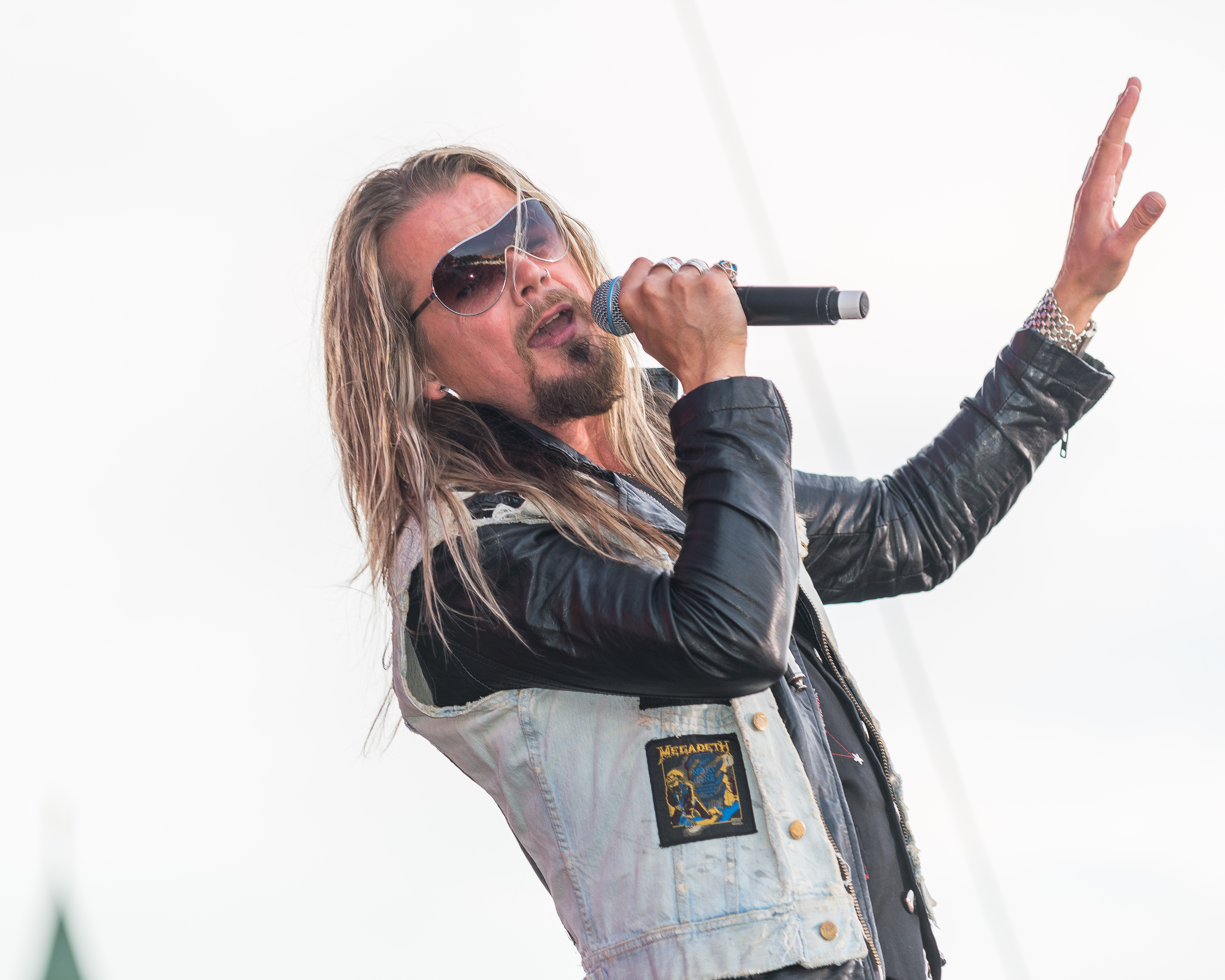
Jacob Samuel 2015

=== Final line-up ===
- Jakob Samuel – vocals
- Christian Lundqvist – drums
- Henrik Bergqvist – guitar
- Germain Leth – bass

=== Previous members ===
- Pontus Norgren – guitar
- Pontus Egberg – bass
- Johan Flodquvist – bass
- Emil Lindroth – keyboards, vocals
- Kristian Hermansson – vocals

== Discography ==
=== Albums ===
Studio albums

Year	Album	Peak positions	Certification
Year	Album	SWE	Certification
2006	Metal Will Stand Tall	4	
2007	Sweet Trade	8	
2009	Clash of the Elements	5	
2011	Performocracy	1	
2013	Tour De Force	5	
2015	Devil in the Details	27	
2018	Prisma		

Live albums

Year	Album	Peak positions	Certification
Year	Album	SWE	Certification
2010	No Quarter	50	

=== Singles ===
Year	Album	Peak positions	Certification	Album
Year	Album	SWE	Certification	Album
2006	"Night of Passion"	2		
2006	"Metal Will Stand Tall" (feat. Tess Merkel)	2		
2006	"Song for You"	7		
2007	"Seven Seas" (feat. Peter Stormare)	10		
2007	"Streets of Fire"	–		
2008	"Line of Fire" (E-Type & The Poodles)	3		
2008	"Raise the Banner" (Swedish official song for the Olympic Games in Beijing 2008)	1		
2009	"One Out of Ten"	1		Clash of the Elements

Other singles (non charting)

- 2009: "I Rule the Night"
- 2011: "Cuts Like a Knife"
- 2011: "I Want It All"
- 2013: "40 Days and 40 Nights"

=== Compilations ===
- 2006: Various artists – Melodifestivalen 2006
