= Jag ljuger så bra =

- CD single

Single by Linda Bengtzing

from the album Ingenting att förlora
- Released: 13 March 2006 (Sweden)
- Recorded: 2005
- Genre: pop
- Length: 3:08
- Label: M&L Records
- Songwriter(s): Ingela “Pling” Forsman; Lars Diedricson; Martin Hedström
- Producer(s): Lars Diedricson; Martin Hedström

Linda Bengtzing singles chronology
"Diamanter" (2005)	"Jag ljuger så bra" (2006)	"Kan du se" (2006)

"Jag ljuger så bra" ("I lie so well") is the third single from Swedish pop singer Linda Bengtzing, released on her debut studio album Ingenting att förlora during the first quarter of 2006. Bengtzing performed the song in Melodifestivalen 2006, finishing seventh in the finale.

The song, composed especially for Melodifestivalen by Lars Diedricson, Martin Hedström, and Ingela “Pling” Forsman, was originally written for another artist, Jessica Andersson, who instead chose "Kalla nätter" ("Cold Nights") to perform at the contest.

== Track listing ==
1. Jag ljuger så bra (Radio Version) 3:08
2. Jag ljuger så bra (Karaoke Version) 3:06

== Melodifestivalen 2006 ==
On 18 February 2006, Bengtzing's performance of the song qualified for the final round of Melodifestivalen 2006 by placing 2nd at the first semifinal in the city of Leksand. At the final in Stockholm, it finished in seventh place with 56 points, 34 from juries and 22 from public (138,249 televotes).

== Commercial performance ==
=== Swedish Singles Chart ===
The single was released in Sweden on 13 March 2006, debuting at number 23 on the Swedish Singles Chart three days later. It climbed to number four the next week and peaked at number two during its fifth week on the chart. It stayed in the Swedish top 60 for a total of 20 weeks.

=== Svensktoppen ===
The song directly entered the fourth place at Svensktoppen on 9 April 2006. A third place was the best result there. On 13 August 2006, Jag ljuger så bra made its nineteenth and last Svensktoppen visit.

== Charts ==
Chart performance for "Jag ljuger så bra"
Chart (2006)	Peak position
Sweden (Sverigetopplistan)	2
