= Night of Passion =

Single by The Poodles

from the album Metal Will Stand Tall
- Released: 13 March 2006
- Genre: Hard rock
- Label: Nordsong
- Songwriter(s): Robert Olausson, Maiti Alfonzetti, Sonja Aldén, Johan Lyander

The Poodles singles chronology
"Night of Passion" (2006)	"Metal Will Stand Tall" (2006)

Night of Passion is a song written by Robert Olausson, Maiti Alfonzetti, Sonja Aldén and Johan Lyander, and performed by Swedish hard rock band The Poodles at Melodifestivalen 2006, ending up fourth.

== Single record ==
The single was released on 13 March 2006 as the first single of the 2006 Poodles album "Metal Will Stand Tall". At the Swedish singles chart the song peaked at second position. The song also charted at Svensktoppen reaching a fifth position on 16 April 2006. On 2 July 2006 the song did its final Svensktoppen visit, peaking at fourth position twice during a chart visit lasting 12 weeks. In 2006 the song also charted at Trackslistan.

== Other versions ==
The song was also performed at Dansbandskampen 2009 by Sannex in an acoustic version, when the Poodles and heavy metal was the theme of the night during the second competition of the year. Sannex also recorded the song on the album Får jag lov? 2011.

== Single track listing ==
1. Night of Passion (radio mix) – 2:59
2. Night of Passion (singback mix) – 2:59

== Charts ==
=== Weekly charts ===
Chart (2006)	Peak position
Sweden (Sverigetopplistan)	2

=== Year-end charts ===
Chart (2006)	Position
Sweden (Sverigetopplistan)	27
