= Lev livet! =

Single by Magnus Carlsson

from the album Magnus Carlsson
- A-side: "Lev livet!"
- B-side: "Lev livet!" (instrumental version)
- Released: March 2006
- Genre: pop, schlager
- Label: Sony BMG Music Entertainment
- Songwriters: Anders Glenmark; Niklas Strömstedt

Magnus Carlsson singles chronology
""Gå din egen väg!""" (2004)	"Lev livet!" (2006)	"Mellan vitt och svart" (2006)

"Lev livet!" is a song written by Anders Glenmark and Niklas Strömstedt, and performed by Magnus Carlsson at Melodifestivalen 2006, where it went further from the semifinal in Karlstad to the final inside the Stockholm Globe Arena where it ended up eight. The single was released in 2006.

The song received a Svensktoppen on 14 May 2006, but failed to enter chart.

== Charts ==
Chart (2006)	Peak position
Sweden (Sverigetopplistan)	1
