= Melodifestivalen 2006 =

Swedish music competition

Dates and venue
- Heat 1: 18 February 2006
- Heat 2: 25 February 2006
- Heat 3: 4 March 2006
- Heat 4: 11 March 2006
- Second chance: 12 March 2006
- Final: 18 March 2006

Organisation
- Broadcaster: Sveriges Television (SVT)
- Presenters: Heats and Final: Lena Philipsson; Second chance: Carin Hjulström-Livh; Henrik Johnsson

Participants
- Number of entries: 32
- Number of finalists: 10

Vote
- Voting system: Heats and Second chance: 100% public vote Final: 50% public vote, 50% jury vote
- Winning song: "Evighet" by Carola

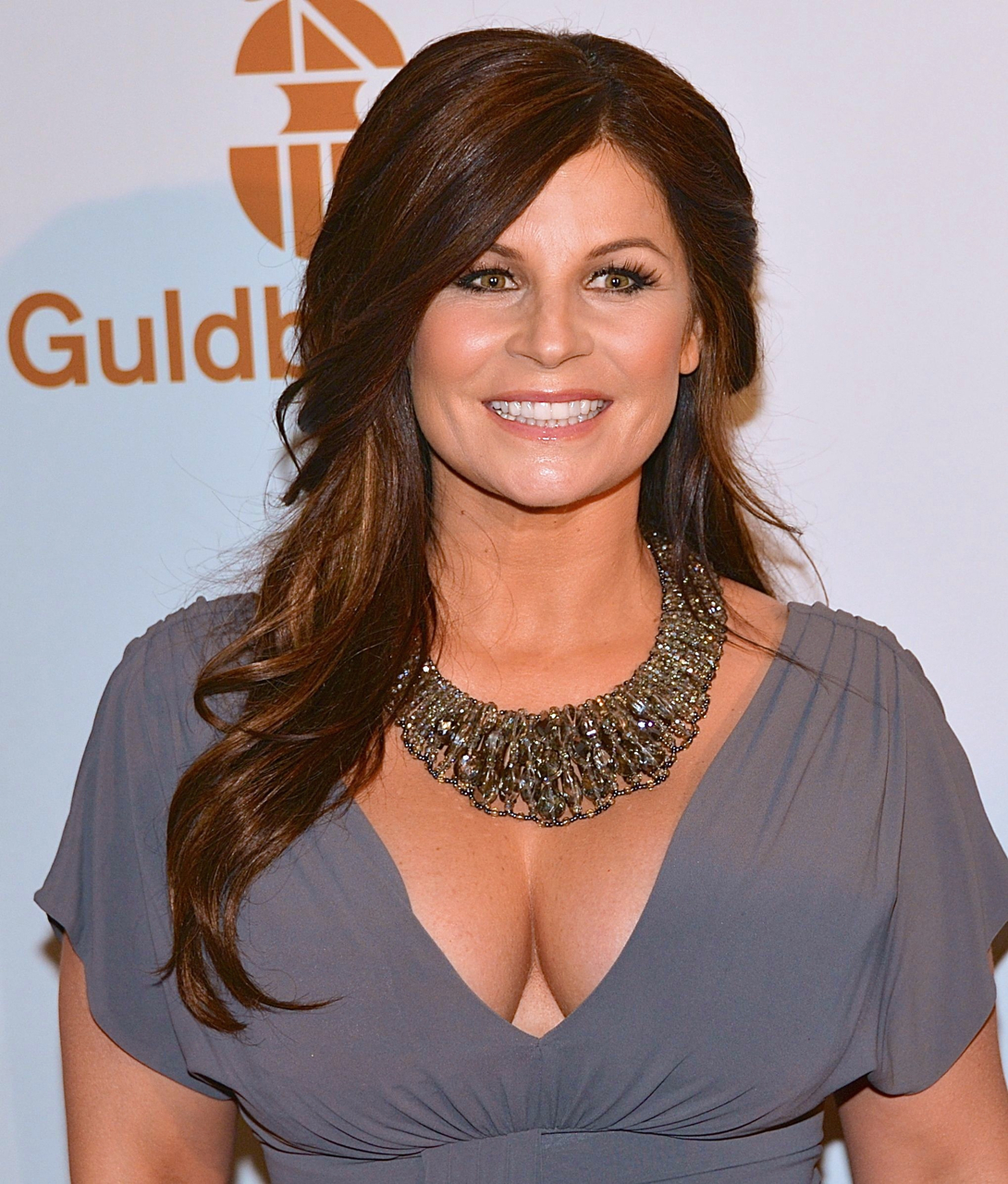
Carola Häggkvist at the Guldbagge Gala at Cirkus, Stockholm on January 21, 2013.

Melodifestivalen 2006 was the 46th edition of the Swedish music competition Melodifestivalen, which was organised by Sveriges Television (SVT) and took place over a five-week period between 18 February and 18 March 2006. The winner of the competition was Carola with the song "Evighet". She represented Sweden in the Eurovision Song Contest 2006, with the English version of the song, "Invincible", where she came fifth with 170 points.

== Format ==
The heats for Melodifestivalen 2006 began on 18 February 2006. Ten songs from these heats qualified for the final on 18 March 2006. This was the fifth year that a heat format had been used for the competition.

On 15 August 2005, SVT confirmed that Leksand, Karlstad, Karlskrona and Gothenburg would host the heats of Melodifestivalen 2006, with the final taking place at the Stockholm Globe Arena for the fifth year running (sixth overall).

Lena Philipsson was a surprise choice as host, as rumors had been spreading that SVT wanted Helena Paparizou to present the Gothenburg heat or the final. The proposed changes to the voting format (caused by the controversy over Nanne Grönvall's defeat in Melodifestivalen 2005) never materialised.

Competition Schedule
Show	Date	City	Venue
Heat 1	18 February 2006	Leksand	Ejendals Arena
Heat 2	25 February 2006	Karlstad	Löfbergs Lila Arena
Heat 3	4 March 2006	Karlskrona	Arena Rosenholm
Heat 4	11 March 2006	Gothenburg	Scandinavium
Second chance	12 March 2006	Stockholm	SVT Broadcasting House
Final	18 March 2006	Stockholm	Stockholm Globe Arena

=== Wildcards ===
Unlike past years, where all Melodifestivalen participants were chosen by a selection jury, starting in 2004, four out of the 32 participants were selected directly by the contest's producers, in order to increase musical and artistic breadth. Each artist, called "wildcard", participated in a different heat. BWO were unveiled as the first wildcard in a pre-Christmas special. There was much speculation that Eurovision Song Contest 1999 winner Charlotte Perrelli would be among the others, but ultimately was not included when the final list was revealed in late January 2006. The wildcards in 2006 were the following:

Artist	Song	Heat
Andreas Johnson	"Sing for Me"	Heat 1
Magnus Carlsson	"Lev livet!"	Heat 2
BWO	"Temple of Love"	Heat 3
Rednex	"Mama, Take Me Home"	Heat 4

== Competing entries ==
Artist	Song	Songwriter(s)
Andreas Johnson	"Sing for Me"	Andreas Johnson; Peter Kvint
Anna Sahlene	"This Woman"	Anna Sahlin; Bobby Ljunggren; Henrik Wikström
Björn Kjellman	"Älskar du livet"	Calle Kindbom; Dan Fernström
BWO	"Temple of Love"	Alexander Bard; Anders Hansson
Carola	"Evighet"	Carola Häggkvist; Thomas G:son; Bobby Ljunggren; Henrik Wikström
Electric Banana Band	"Kameleont"	Lasse Åberg; Janne Schaffer
Elysion	"Golden Star"	Dan Attlerud; Andreas Nordqvist; Mikael Anderfjärd
Evan	"Under Your Spell"	Jonas Sjöström; Malin Eriksson; Pontus Ewan Hagberg
Gregor	"Mi amor"	Henrik Rongedal; Lotta Ahlin; Magnus Rongedal; Tommy Lydell
Günter and the Sunshine Girls	"Like Fire Tonight"	Anderz Wrethov; Mats Söderlund
Hannah Graaf	"Naughty Boy"	Joacim Dubbelman; Martin Landh; Sam McCarthy
Jessica Andersson	"Kalla nätter"	Johan Fransson; Niklas Edberger; Tim Larsson; Tobias Lundgren
Jessica Folcker	"When Love's Comin' Back Again"	Pontus Assarsson; Thomas G:son
Kayo	"Innan natten är över"	Henrik Sethsson; Thomas G:son
Kikki Danielsson	"Idag & imorgon"	Thomas G:son; Calle Kindbom
Laila Adèle	"Don't Try To Stop Me"	Henrik Hansson; Anders Hallbäck
Linda Bengtzing	"Jag ljuger så bra"	Ingela Forsman; Lars Diedricson; Martin Hedström
Magnus Bäcklund	"The Name of Love"	Lina Eriksson; Mårten Eriksson
Magnus Carlsson	"Lev livet!"	Niklas Strömstedt; Anders Glenmark
Niclas Wahlgren	"En droppe regn"	Ingela Forsman; Bobby Ljunggren; Henrik Wikström
Östen med Resten	"Ge mig en kaka till kaffet"	Thomas G:son
Pablo Cepeda	"La chica de la copa"	Johan Ramström; Pablo Cepeda; Patrik Magnusson
Pandang	"Kuddkrig"	Adam Chiapponi; Stefan Wesström; Kristofer Stange
Patrik Isaksson	"Faller du så faller jag"	Patrik Isaksson
Rednex	"Mama, Take Me Home"	Matthews Green; Michael Clauss
Roger Pontare	"Silverland"	Marcos Ubeda; Thomas G:son
Sandra Dahlberg	"Jag tar det jag vill ha"	Johan Fransson; Niklas Edberger; Tim Larsson; Tobias Lundgren; Sandra Dahlberg
Simone Moreno	"Aiayeh (The Music of the Samba)"	Anders von Hofsten; Andreas Unge; Simone Moreno; Andreas Kleerup
Sonya	"Etymon"	Ingela Forsman; Bobby Ljunggren; Henrik Wikström
The Elephantz	"Oh Yeah"	Daniel Bäckström; Eddie Brown; Funky Dan Larsson; Jens Patrik Duvsjö; Martin Carboo
The Poodles	"Night of Passion"	Sonja Aldén; Johan Lyander; Matti Alfonzetti; Robert Olausson
Velvet	"Mi amore"	Joacim Persson; Niclas Molinder; Pelle Ankarberg

== Contest overview ==
=== Heat 1 ===
The first heat took place on 18 February 2006 at the Ejendals Arena in Leksand. 3,045,000 viewers watched the heat live. A total of 466,660 votes were cast, with a total of SEK 1,181,000 collected for Radiohjälpen.

R/O	Artist	Song	Votes			Place	Result
R/O	Artist	Song	Round 1	Round 2	Total	Place	Result
1	Simone Moreno	"Aiayeh (The Music of the Samba)"	6,688	—N/a	6,688	8	Out
2	Electric Banana Band	"Kameleont"	32,192	29,037	61,229	4	Second Chance
3	Anna Sahlene	"This Woman"	22,078	25,954	48,032	5	Out
4	Magnus Bäcklund	"The Name of Love"	39,442	45,561	85,003	3	Second Chance
5	Linda Bengtzing	"Jag ljuger så bra"	49,506	56,658	106,164	2	Final
6	Pandang	"Kuddkrig"	16,611	—N/a	16,611	6	Out
7	Hannah Graaf	"Naughty Boy"	14,230	—N/a	14,230	7	Out
8	Andreas Johnson	"Sing for Me"	56,354	61,323	117,677	1	Final

=== Heat 2 ===
The second heat took place on 25 February 2006 at the Löfbergs Lila Arena in Karlstad. 2,320,000 viewers watched the heat live. A total of 306,074 votes were cast, with a total of SEK 617,542 collected for Radiohjälpen.

R/O	Artist	Song	Votes			Place	Result
R/O	Artist	Song	Round 1	Round 2	Total	Place	Result
1	Magnus Carlsson	"Lev livet!"	31,115	49,610	80,765	1	Final
2	The Elephantz	"Oh Yeah"	7,856	—N/a	7,856	8	Out
3	Sonya	"Etymon"	16,541	17,299	33,840	5	Out
4	Östen med Resten	"Ge mig en kaka till kaffet"	13,617	—N/a	13,617	6	Out
5	Pablo Cepeda	"La chica de la copa"	12,630	—N/a	12,630	7	Out
6	Kikki Danielsson	"Idag & imorgon"	35,792	35,753	71,545	2	Final
7	Niclas Wahlgren	"En droppe regn"	17,600	23,339	40,939	4	Second Chance
8	Velvet	"Mi amore"	21,496	22,627	44,123	3	Second Chance

=== Heat 3 ===
The third heat took place on 4 March 2006 at the Arena Rosenholm in Karlskrona. 3,109,000 viewers watched the heat live. A total of 411,478 votes were cast, with a total of SEK 810,713 collected for Radiohjälpen.

R/O	Artist	Song	Votes			Place	Result
R/O	Artist	Song	Round 1	Round 2	Total	Place	Result
1	BWO	"Temple of Love"	38,733	53,820	92,553	2	Final
2	Jessica Folcker	"When Love's Comin' Back Again"	14,725	—N/a	14,725	7	Out
3	Gregor	"Mi amor"	6,801	—N/a	6,801	8	Out
4	Jessica Andersson	"Kalla nätter"	17,873	26,247	44,120	5	Out
5	The Poodles	"Night of Passion"	45,927	56,242	102,169	1	Final
6	Elysion	"Golden Star"	27,241	31,864	59,105	3	Second Chance
7	Patrik Isaksson	"Faller du så faller jag"	22,985	33,080	56,065	4	Second Chance
8	Kayo	"Innan natten är över"	17,770	—N/a	17,770	6	Out

=== Heat 4 ===
The fourth heat took place on 11 March 2006 at the Scandinavium in Gothenburg. 3,645,000 viewers watched the heat live. A total of 653,991 votes were cast, with a total of SEK 1,475,132 collected for Radiohjälpen.

R/O	Artist	Song	Votes			Place	Result
R/O	Artist	Song	Round 1	Round 2	Total	Place	Result
1	Roger Pontare	"Silverland"	29,939	37,645	67,584	4	Second Chance
2	Laila Adèle	"Don't Try To Stop Me"	17,851	—N/a	17,851	7	Out
3	Günter and the Sunshine Girls	"Like Fire Tonight"	20,767	—N/a	20,767	6	Out
4	Sandra Dahlberg	"Jag tar det jag vill ha"	26,462	34,769	61,231	5	Out
5	Evan	"Under Your Spell"	13,600	—N/a	13,600	8	Out
6	Rednex	"Mama, Take Me Home"	37,104	50,418	87,522	3	Second Chance
7	Björn Kjellman	"Älskar du livet"	40,574	53,000	93,574	2	Final
8	Carola	"Evighet"	139,952	151,021	290,973	1	Final

=== Second chance ===
The second chance round took place on 12 March 2006 at the SVT Broadcasting House in Stockholm. 2,140,000 viewers watched the show live. A total of 480,449 votes were cast, with a total of SEK 721,990 collected for Radiohjälpen.

R/O	Artist	Song	Votes			Place	Result
R/O	Artist	Song	Round 1	Round 2	Total	Place	Result
1	Electric Banana Band	"Kameleont"	14,961	—N/a	14,961	6	Out
2	Magnus Bäcklund	"The Name of Love"	35,823	53,582	89,405	2	Final
3	Niclas Wahlgren	"En droppe regn"	10,584	—N/a	10,584	8	Out
4	Velvet	"Mi amore"	12,076	—N/a	12,076	7	Out
5	Elysion	"Golden Star"	25,947	33,583	59,530	5	Out
6	Patrik Isaksson	"Faller du så faller jag"	36,613	51,270	87,883	3	Out
7	Roger Pontare	"Silverland"	36,180	45,188	81,298	4	Out
8	Rednex	"Mama, Take Me Home"	53,635	68,670	122,305	1	Final

=== Final ===
The final took place on 18 March 2006 at the Stockholm Globe Arena in Stockholm. 4,242,000 viewers watched the show live. A total of 1,913,152 votes were cast, with a total of SEK 3,271,259 collected for Radiohjälpen.

R/O	Artist	Song	Juries	Televote		Total	Place
R/O	Artist	Song	Juries	Votes	Points	Total	Place
1	Andreas Johnson	"Sing for Me"	112	350,938	88	200	3
2	Björn Kjellman	"Älskar du livet"	6	83,917	0	6	9
3	Linda Bengtzing	"Jag ljuger så bra"	34	138,249	22	56	7
4	The Poodles	"Night of Passion"	32	180,784	66	98	4
5	Magnus Carlsson	"Lev livet!"	19	44,825	0	19	8
6	Rednex	"Mama, Take Me Home"	17	154,115	44	61	6
7	Carola	"Evighet"	102	437,876	132	234	1
8	Magnus Bäcklund	"The Name of Love"	57	101,799	11	68	5
9	Kikki Danielsson	"Idag & imorgon"	2	51,742	0	2	10
10	BWO	"Temple of Love"	92	368,907	110	202	2

Detailed jury votes
R/O	Song	Örebro	Luleå	Falun	Karlstad	Umeå	Norrköping	Gothenburg	Sundsvall	Växjö	Malmö	Stockholm	Total
1	"Sing for Me"	8	12	10	12	12	12	8	10	12	10	6	112
2	"Älskar du livet"							6					6
3	"Jag ljuger så bra"	1	6	6	1	2	6	1	4	2	4	1	34
4	"Night of Passion"	6	2	2	6	1	2	2	1	4	2	4	32
5	"Lev livet!"			1	4	4	1			1		8	19
6	"Mama, Take Me Home"	4	4						8		1		17
7	"Evighet"	2	8	12	10	10	10	12	12	8	8	10	102
8	"The Name of Love"	10	1	8	8	8	4	4	2	6	6		57
9	"Idag & imorgon"											2	2
10	"Temple of Love"	12	10	4	2	6	8	10	6	10	12	12	92
Jury spokesperson
Fredrik Lindström

== Ratings ==
Viewing figures by show
Show	Air date	Viewers (millions)	Ref.
Heat 1	18 February 2006	3.045	
Heat 2	25 February 2006	2.320	
Heat 3	4 March 2006	3.109	
Heat 4	11 March 2006	3.645	
Second chance	12 March 2006	2.140	
Final	18 March 2006	4.242	

== See also ==
- Eurovision Song Contest 2006
- Sweden in the Eurovision Song Contest
- Sweden in the Eurovision Song Contest 2006
