= Linda Bengtzing =

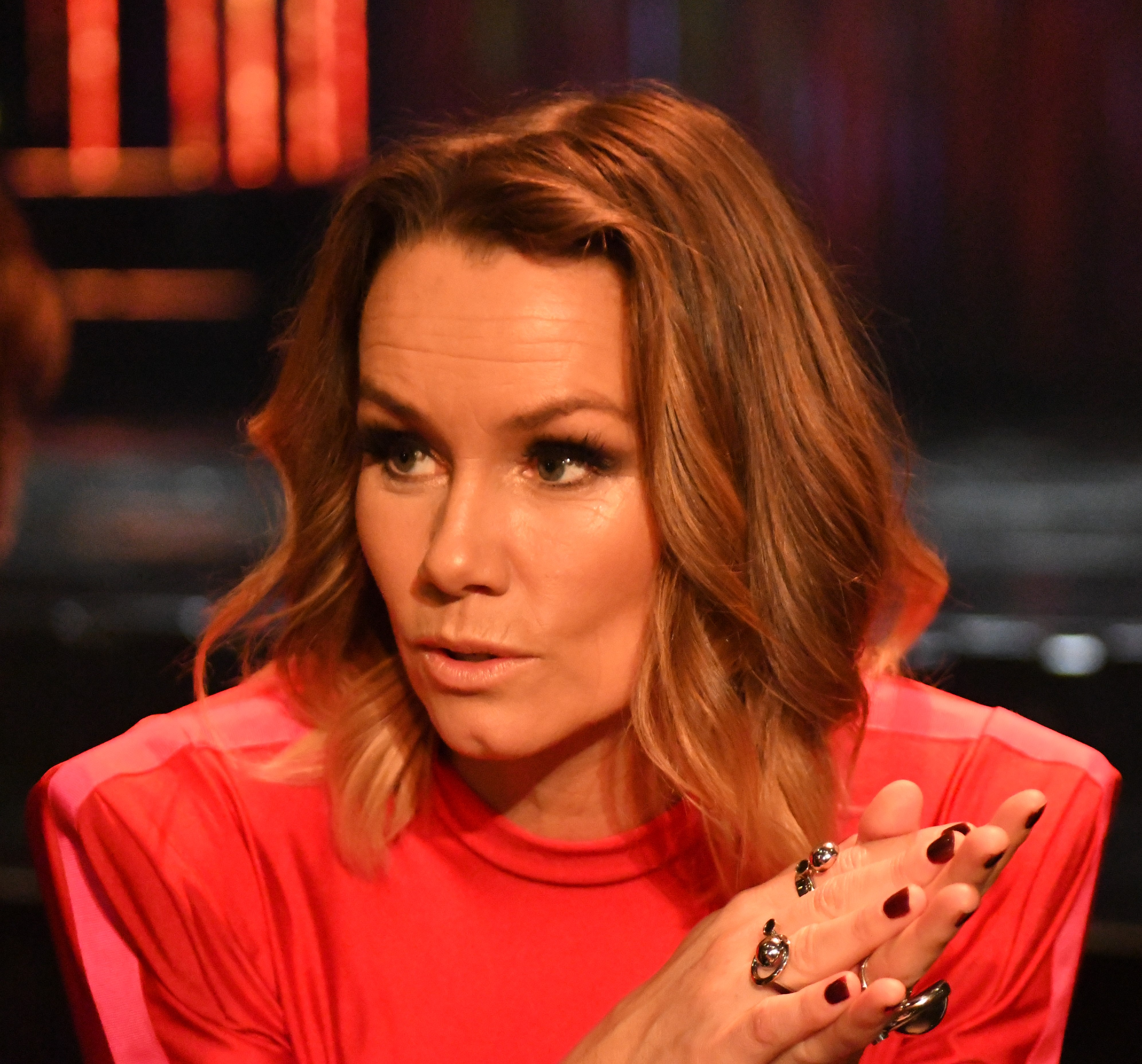
- Bengtzing in 2020

Background information
- Born: Linda Birgitta Bengtzing; 13 March 1974 (age 52); Gullspång, Sweden
- Genres: Pop, Schlager
- Occupation: Singer
- Years active: 1986–present

Linda Birgitta Bengtzing (born 13 March 1974) is a Swedish pop singer famous for her participation in the fourth season of Fame Factory in Sweden and for her entries at Melodifestivalen 2005, 2006, 2008, 2011, 2014, 2016, 2020 and 2022.

== Biography ==
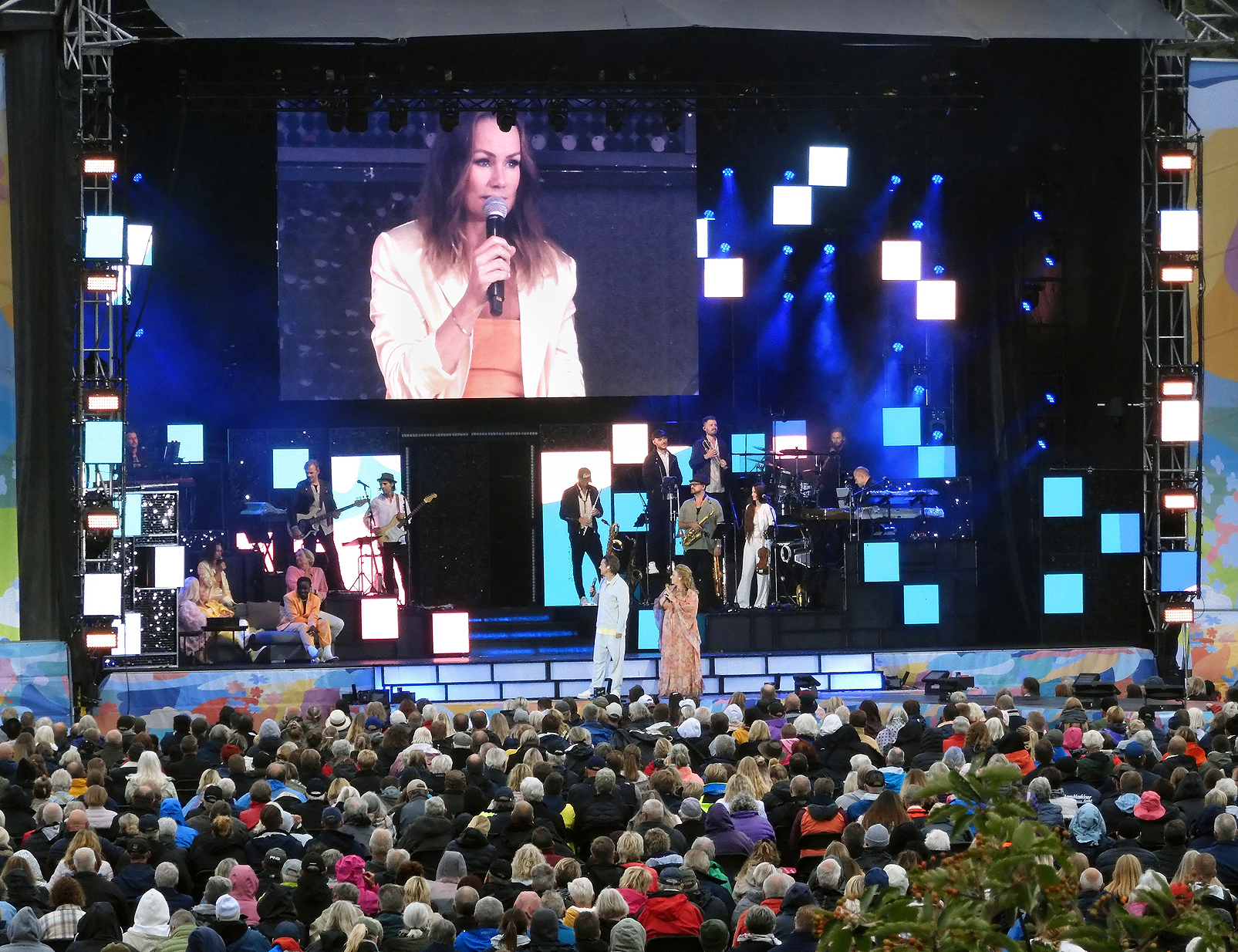
Bengtzing at Diggiloo in Ystad in August 2021

Bengtzing grew up in Gullspång, a little village in Västra Götaland located in the west of Sweden. She released two singles in 1987 and 1989, however, she disappeared from the music industry for 15 years. By the mid 1990s, Linda Bengtzing moved to Stockholm, where she worked as a nanny girl in Östermalm

In 2004, she took part in the fourth and the final season of Fame Factory but she went on the program at the same time as her song "Alla flickor" being selected to participate at Melodifestivalen 2005. Her song surprised everyone and she took part in the Melodifestivalen final after receiving sufficient votes in the 'Andra Chansen' (Second Chance) round. She finished in last place, scoring 15 jury points but receiving 0 points from the Swedish public's televoting. The single reached No. 8 in the Swedish charts and a few months "Diamanter", a song very similar to Alla flickor, reached No. 32.

One year later she appeared again in Melodifestivalen. Her song, "Jag ljuger så bra", written first for Jessica Andersson, finished in the top two of the first heat and, therefore, was entered into the final. Linda's song came seventh out of 10 in the final in the Stockholm Globe Arena. While Linda may not have received many votes from the public the single rose to No. 2 in the Swedish charts, making it her greatest hit. Days before the Melodifestivalen 2006 final, she released her first album, "Ingenting att förlora" (No. 4) and months later the second single from the album, "Kan du se" debuted at No. 7, though did not chart the next week.

In 2007, she released a new single, "Värsta schlagern", a parody on traditional Melodifestivalen entries. The song is rumoured to have been entered into Melodifestivalen 2007 but was not selected as one of the 32 songs to compete for the title in the live shows. The song is a duet together with Markoolio. Linda participated at Melodifestivalen 2008, competing in Heat 4 (Karlskrona) on 1 March 2008, where she directly qualified for the final round. She went on to finish fifth out of ten in the final, with 64 points from the juries but nothing from the public. The song was composed by Johan Fransson, Tim Larsson, Tobias Lundgren and is called Hur svårt kan det va? (How hard can it be?). Linda released her second album on 19 February 2008, four days after the Melodifestivalen final. It has been reported that Linda's record company (Mariann Records) would not allow Linda to release her second album unless she entered Melodifestivalen 2008.

In 2009, she recorded the song "Victorious", which was submitted for the 2010 edition of Melodifestivalen but was not selected. The song was eventually recorded as a duet with the Swedish singer Velvet (one of her friends). On 22 February 2010, the song was available as a digital release and some remixes were also released a few weeks later. The "Victorious" music video was shot in Los Angeles.

In 2011, she once again competed at Melodifestivalen with the song "E de fel på mig?", and 2014, she tried to represent to Sweden at Eurovision Song Contest 2014 but for the first time she failed to reach the final with her song "Ta mig".

Two years later, she participated in Melodifestivalen 2016 with the song "Killer Girl", finishing last in the first round on 27 February 2016 and failing to qualify.

She entered the song "Alla mina sorger" into Melodifestivalen 2020, competing in Heat 2 on 8 February 2020. She finished in sixth place out of seven, failing to qualify.

Her most recent entry into the competition was "Fyrfaldigt hurra!" at Melodifestivalen 2022. She performed the song during Heat 3 on 19 February 2022 and finished fifth, failing to proceed to the final.

== Discography ==
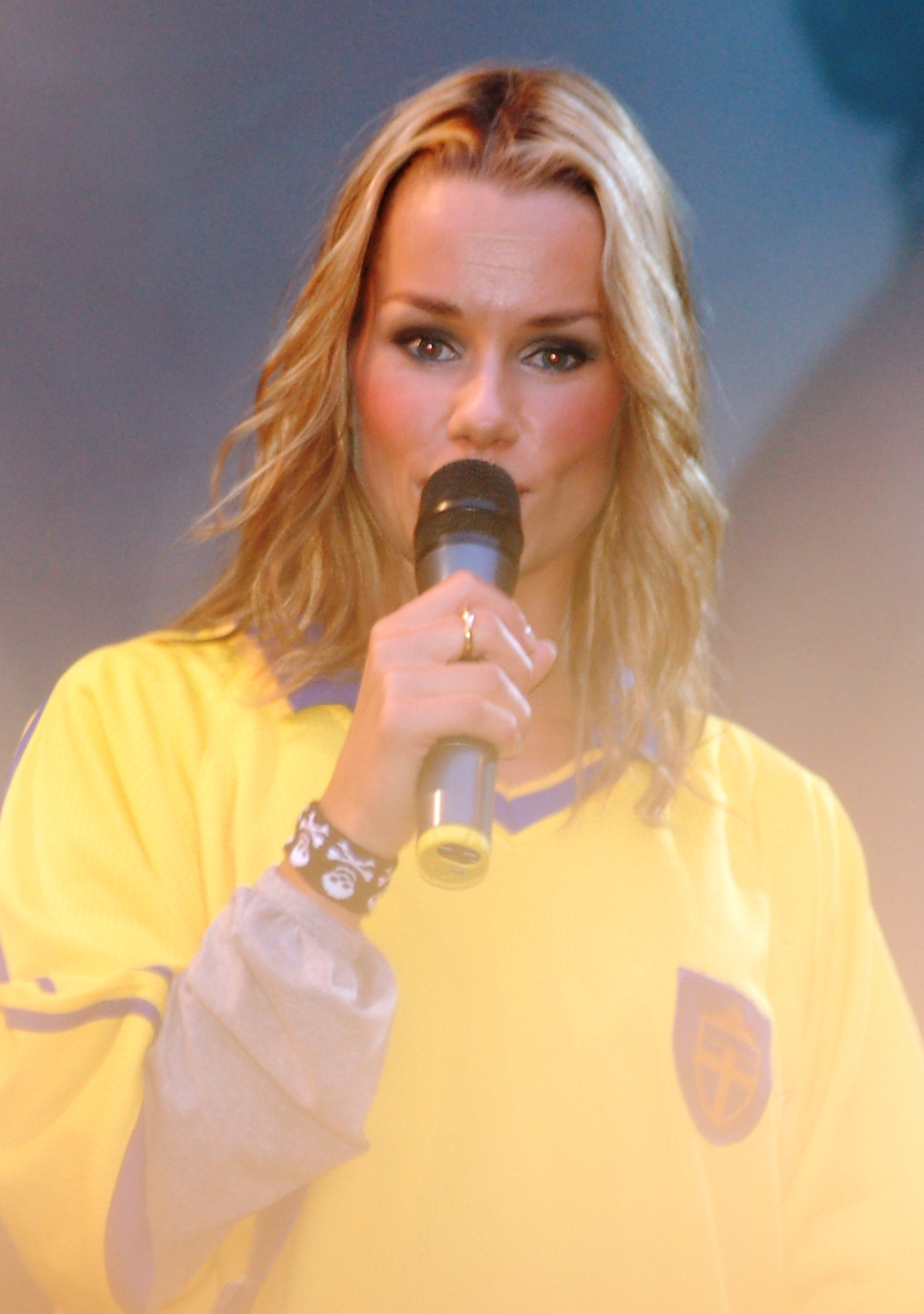
Bengtzing performing in 2008

=== Albums ===
Album details	Chart pos.	Album singles
Album details	Sweden	Album singles
Ingenting att Förlora: Released: 13 March 2006; Certification/Sales: -	4	Singles: 2005 "Alla flickor"; 2005 "Diamanter"; 2006 "Jag Ljuger Så Bra"; 2006 "Kan Du Se"
Vild & Galen: Released: 19 March 2008; Certification/Sales: - Gold	2	Singles: 2007 "Värsta Schlagern"; 2008 "Hur svårt kan det va?"

Compilation albums

- 2011: Min Karusell – En samling (peaked at No. 14 in Sweden)

=== Singles ===
Year	Single	Chart positions			Notes
Year	Single	Sweden	Netherlands	Europe	Notes
2005	"Alla flickor": Album: Ingenting att förlora; Released: February 2005; Formats: CD single	8	-	188	Melodifestivalen 2005
2005	"Diamanter": Album: Ingenting att förlora; Released: 2005; Formats: CD single	35	-	-	
2006	"Jag ljuger så bra": Album: Ingenting att förlora; Released: 13 March 2006; Formats: CD single, digital download; Sales/Certification: 20,000 (Platinum)	2	-	148	Melodifestivalen 2006
2006	"I gult och blått" (With Magnus Hedman): Album: -; Released: July 2006; Formats: CD single	48	-	-	
2006	"Kan du se": Album: Ingenting att förlora; Released: July 2006; Formats: CD single, digital download	7	-	-	
2007	"Värsta schlagern" (featuring Markoolio): Album: Vild & galen; Released: 10 January 2007; Formats: Digital download	1	-	137	
2008	"Hur svårt kan det va?": Album: Vild & galen; Released: 9 March 2008; Formats: CD single, digital download	3	-	-	Melodifestivalen 2008
2009	"Not That Kinda Girl" (with Kim-Lian): Released: 16 October 2009; Formats: CD single, digital download	-	32	-	
2010	"Victorious" (with Velvet): Released: 22 February 2010; Formats: Digital download	15	-	-	
2011	"E det fel på mej": Released: 2011; Formats: CD single, digital download	15	-	-	Melodifestivalen 2011
2014	"Ta mig": Released: 2014; Formats: CD single, digital download	-	-	-	Melodifestivalen 2014
2016	"Killer Girl": Released: 2016; Formats: CD single, digital download	85	-	-	Melodifestivalen 2016
2020	"Alla mina sorger": Released: 8 February 2020; Formats: CD single, digital download, streaming	(Note: "Alla mina sorger" did not enter the Swedish Singellista Chart, but peaked at number 7 on the Swedish Heatseeker Chart.)	-	-	Melodifestivalen 2020
2022	"Fyrfaldigt hurra!": Released: February 2022; Formats: Digital download, streaming	70	-	-	Melodifestivalen 2022

== Image gallery ==
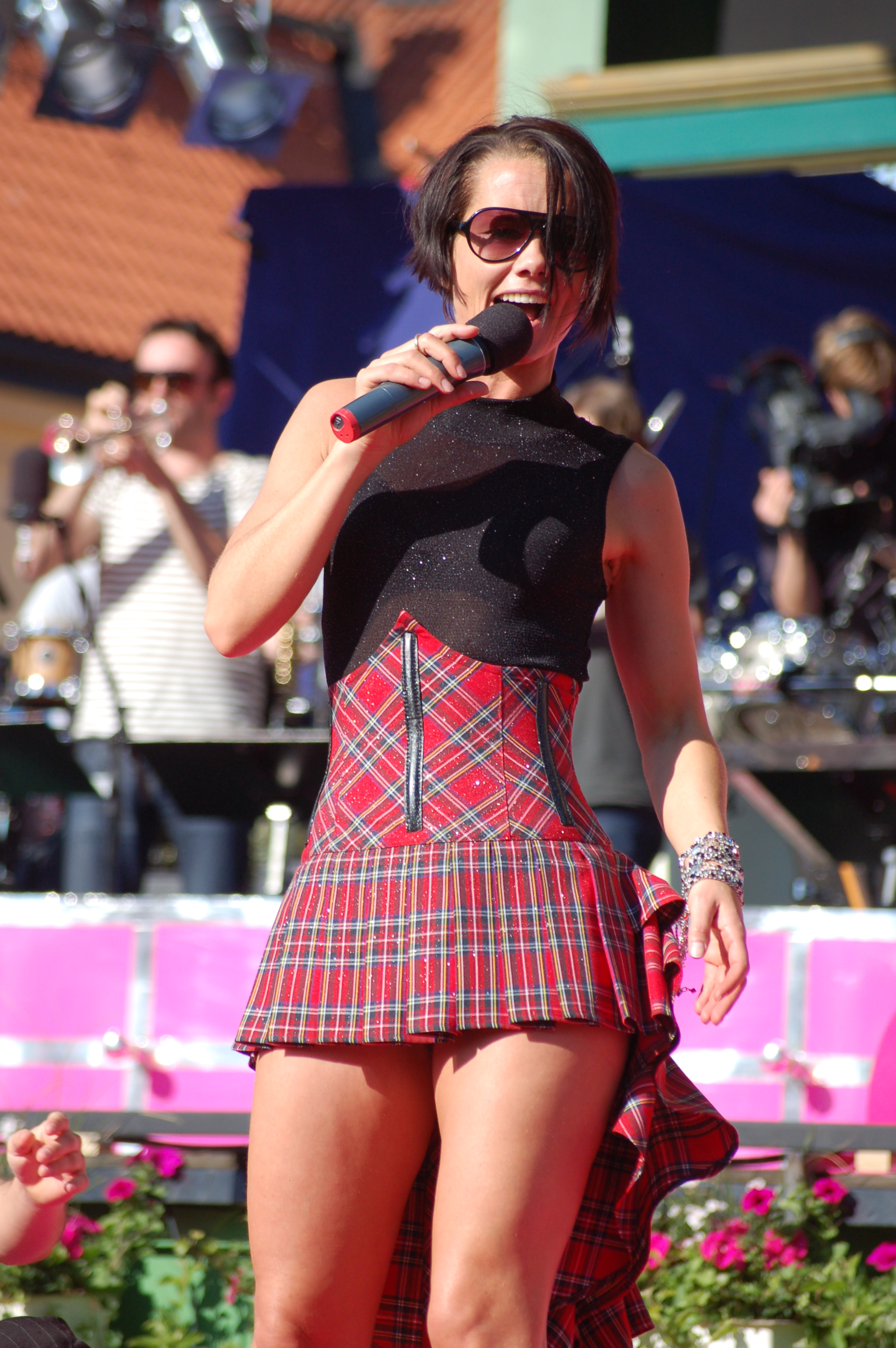
Bengtzing in 2008

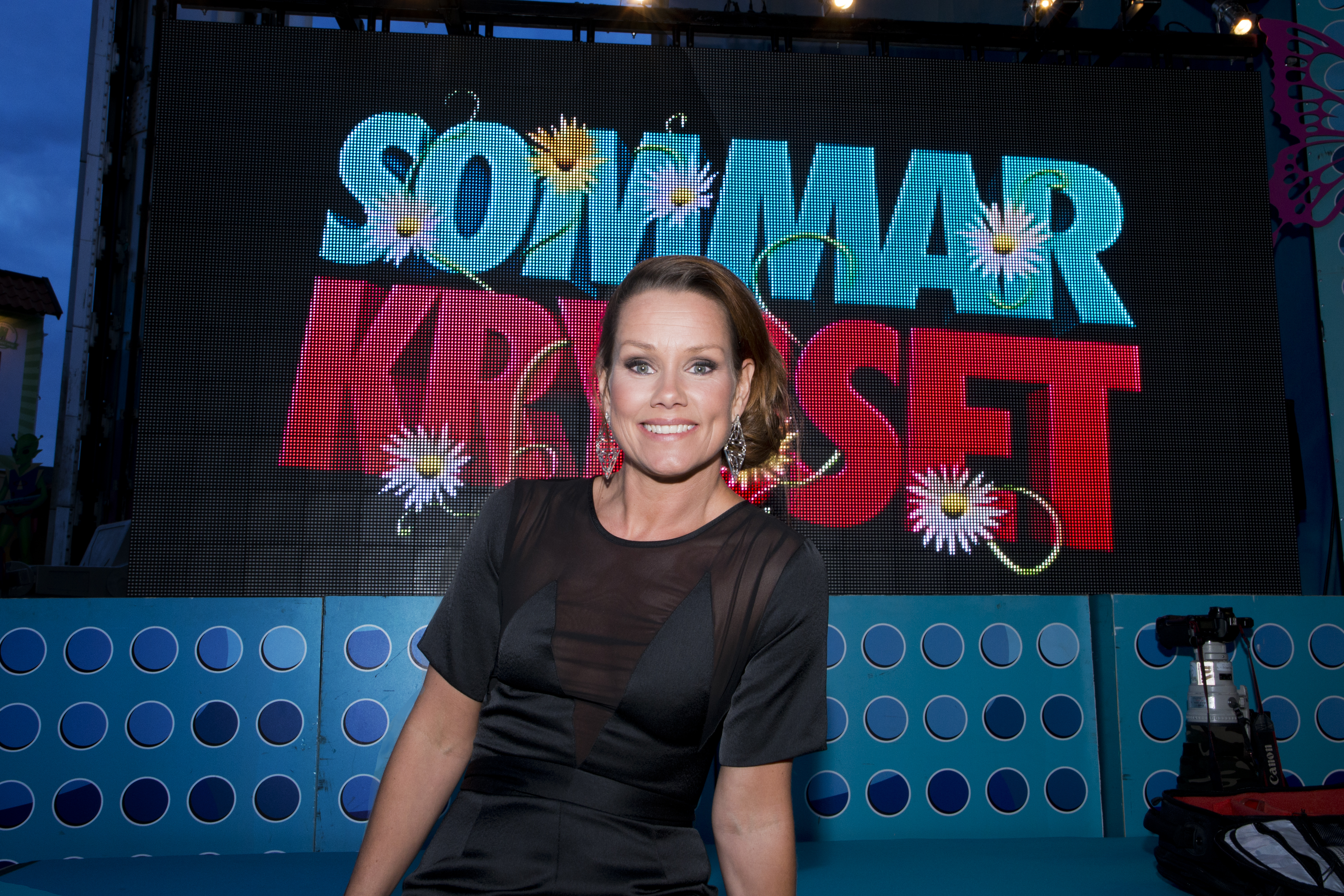
Bengtzing during Sommarkrysset 2014

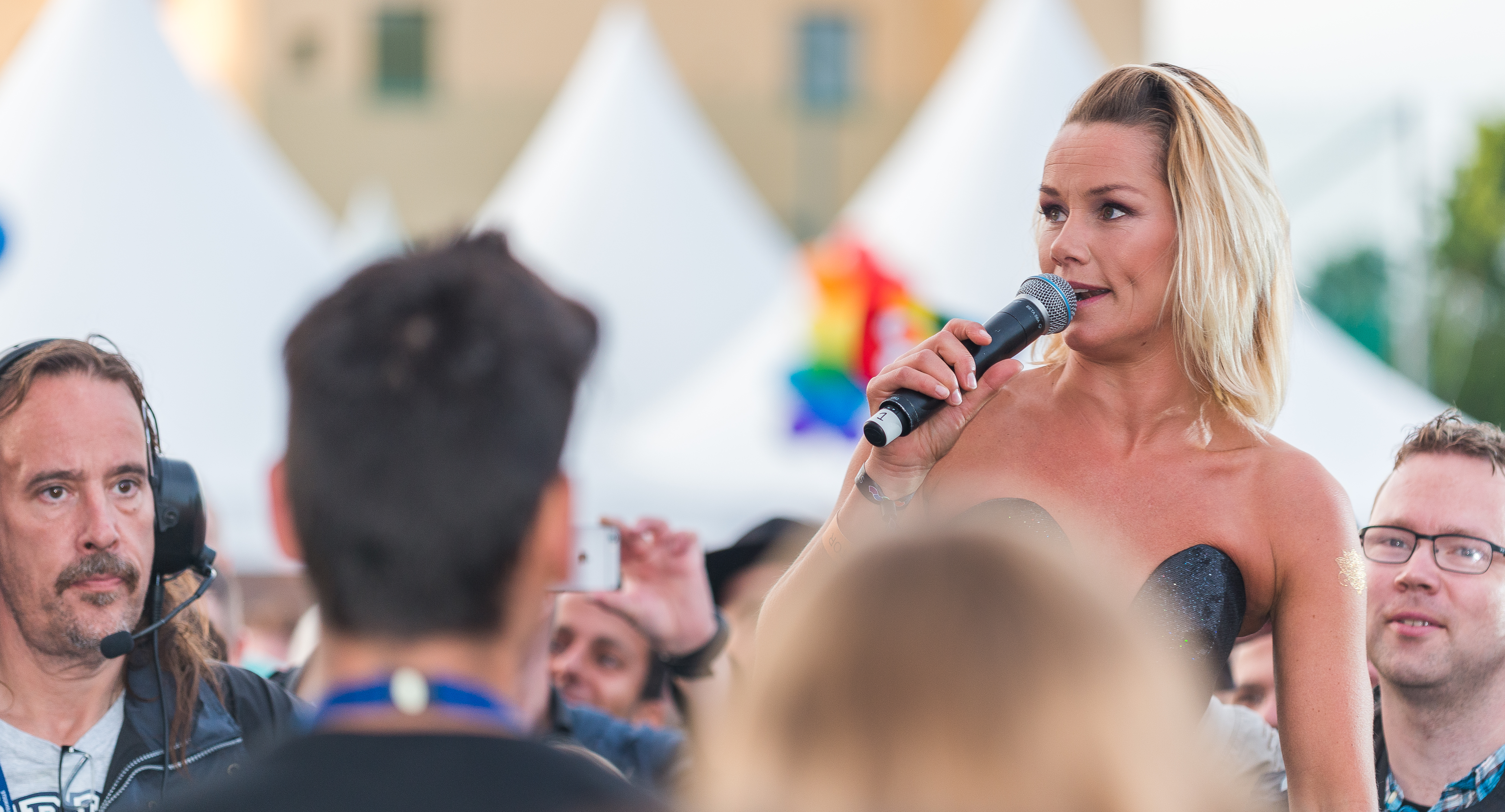
Bengtzing during Stockholm Pride 2015

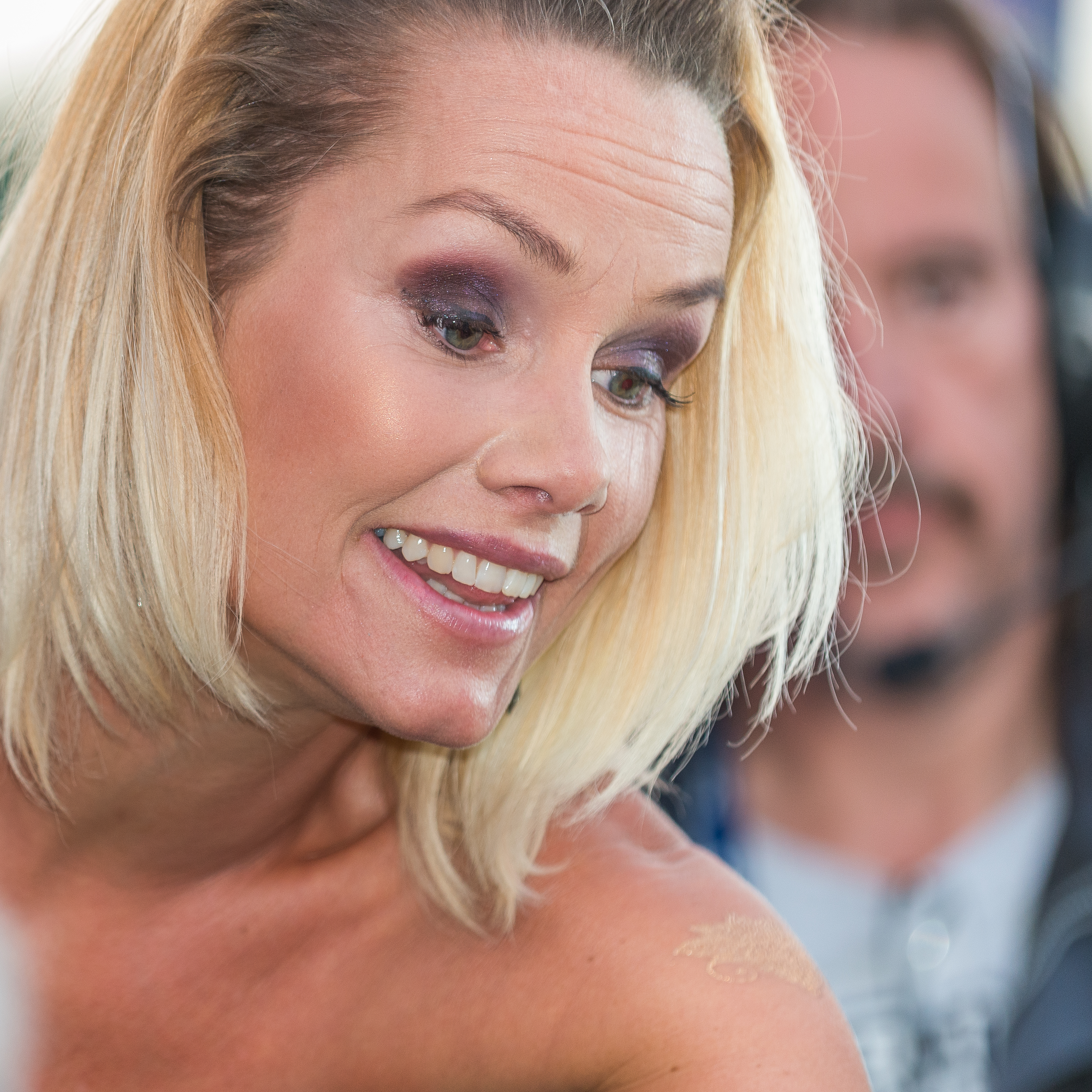
Bengtzing during Stockholm Pride 2015

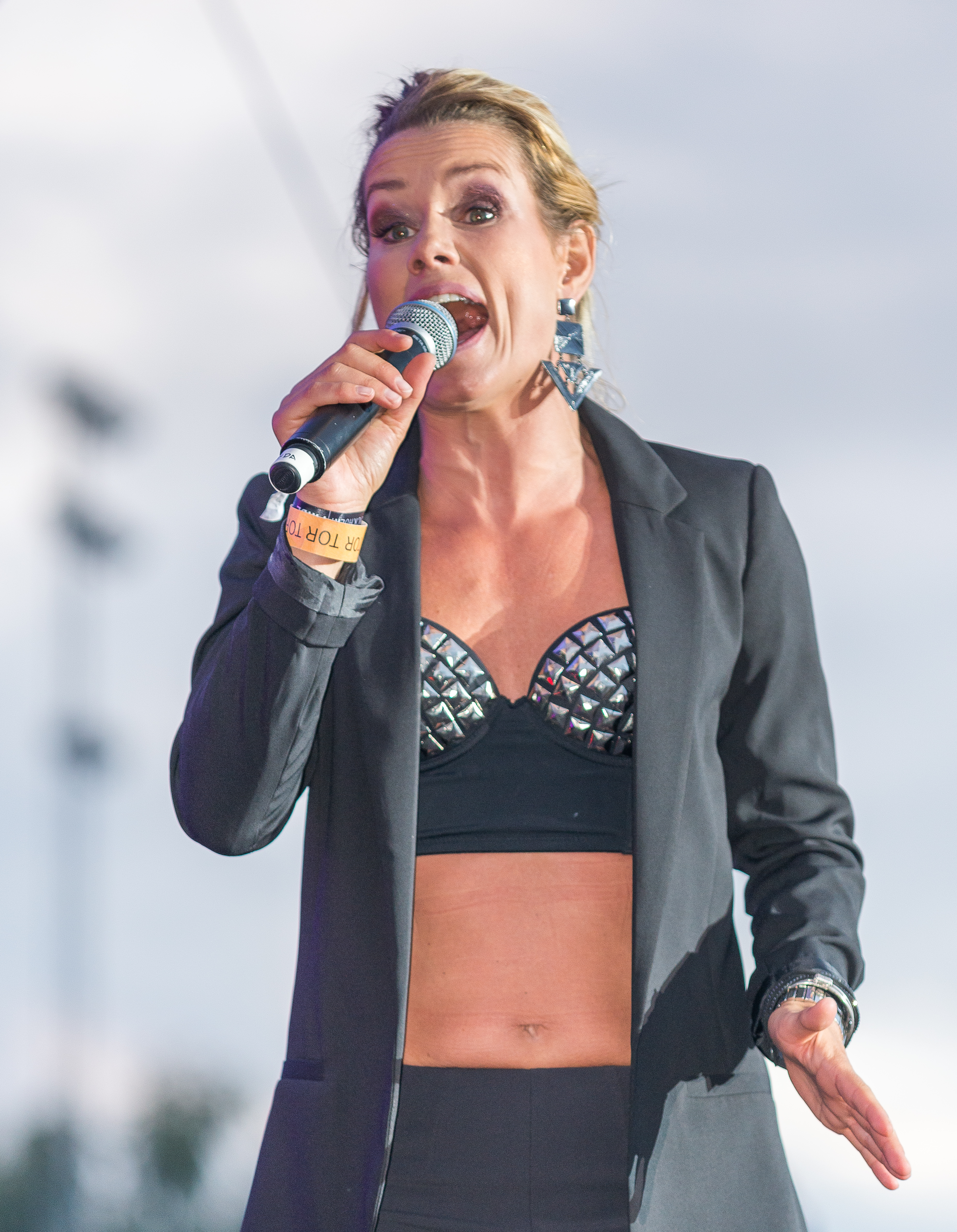
Bengtzing at Stockholm Pride 2015

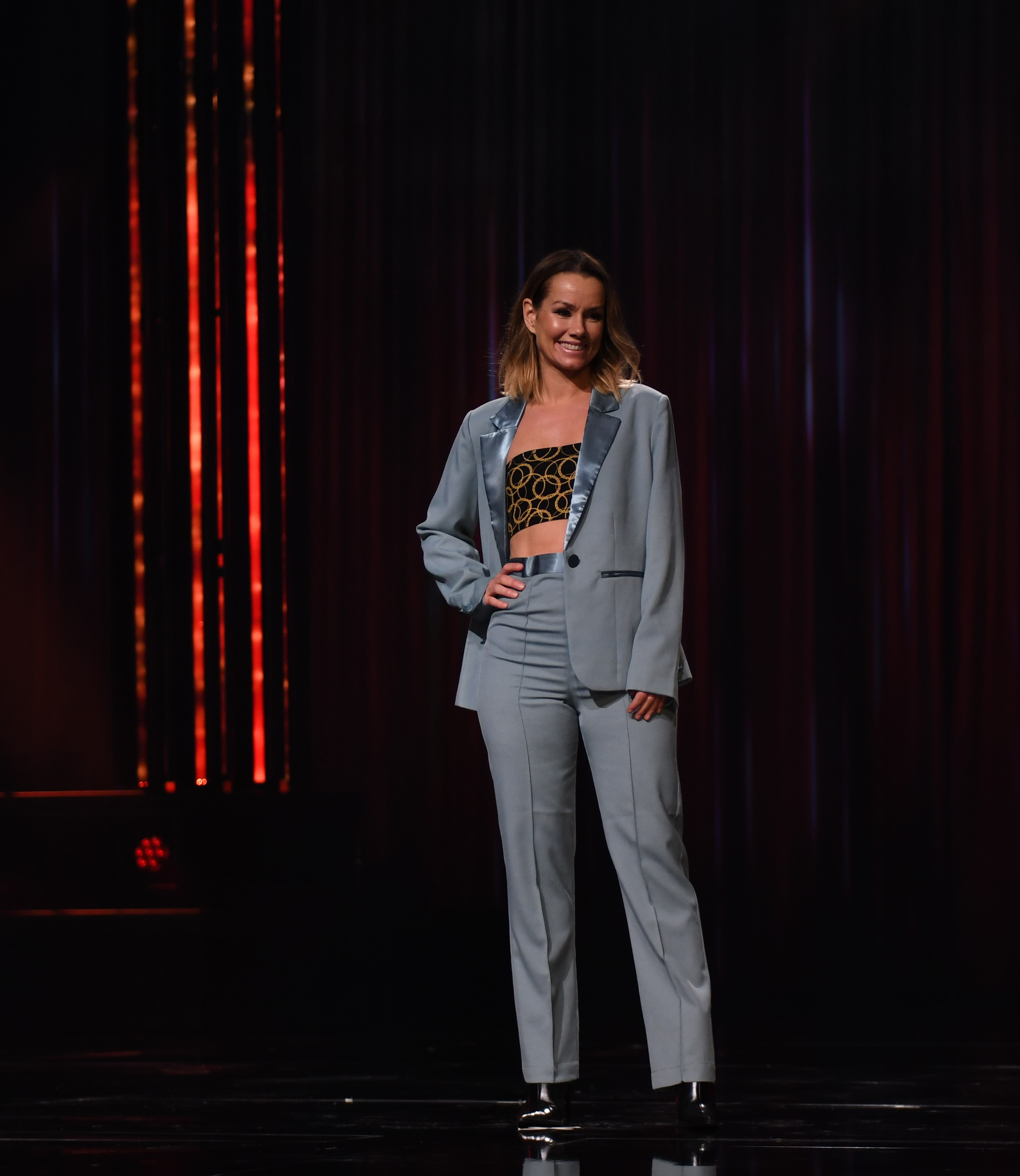
Bengtzing at Melodifestivalen 2020 in Gothenburg

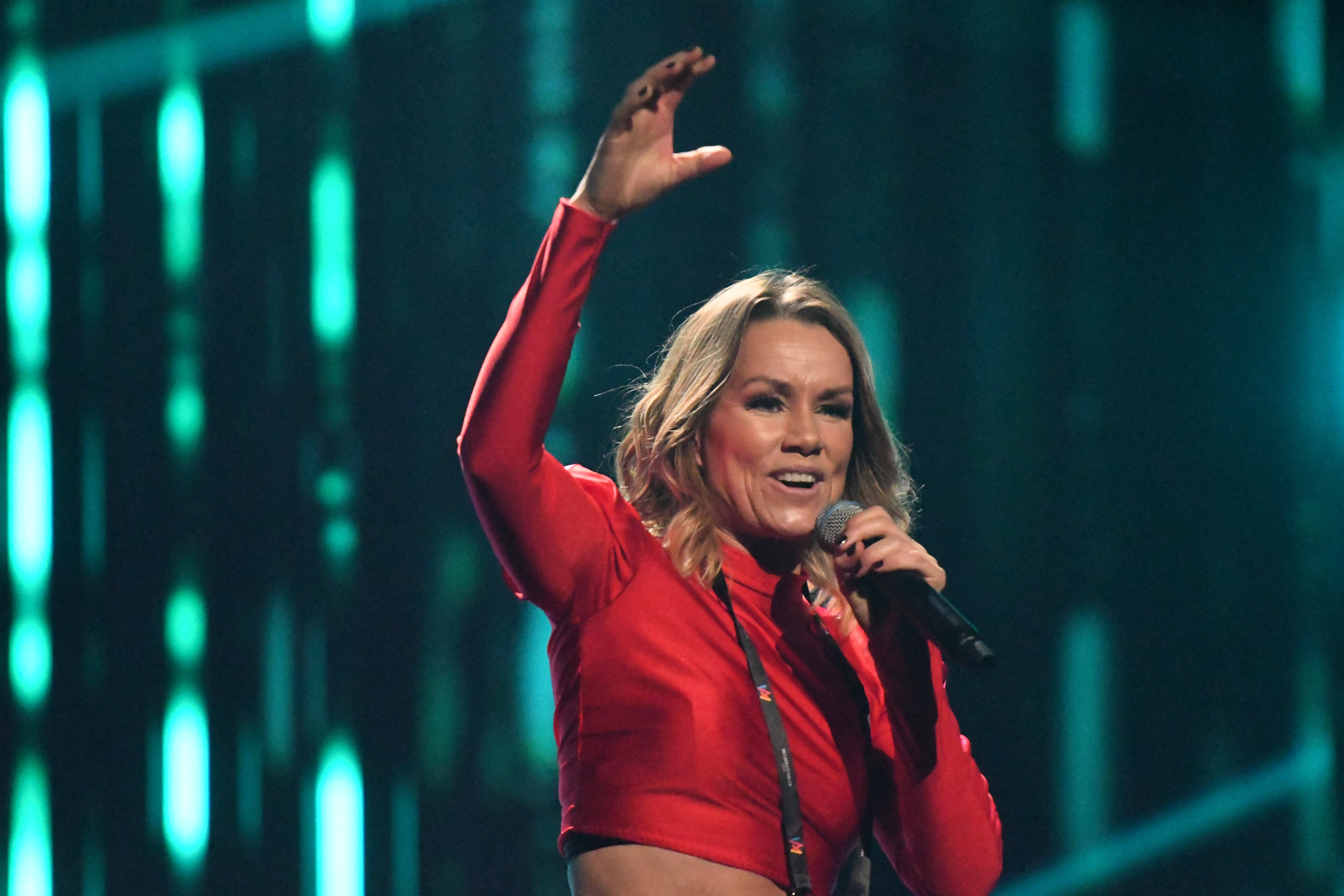
Bengtzing at Melodifestivalen 2020 in Göteborg
