= Rednex discography =

- Studio albums: 3
- Compilation albums: 3
- Singles: 18
- Music videos: 17
- Promotional singles: 9
- EP: 1

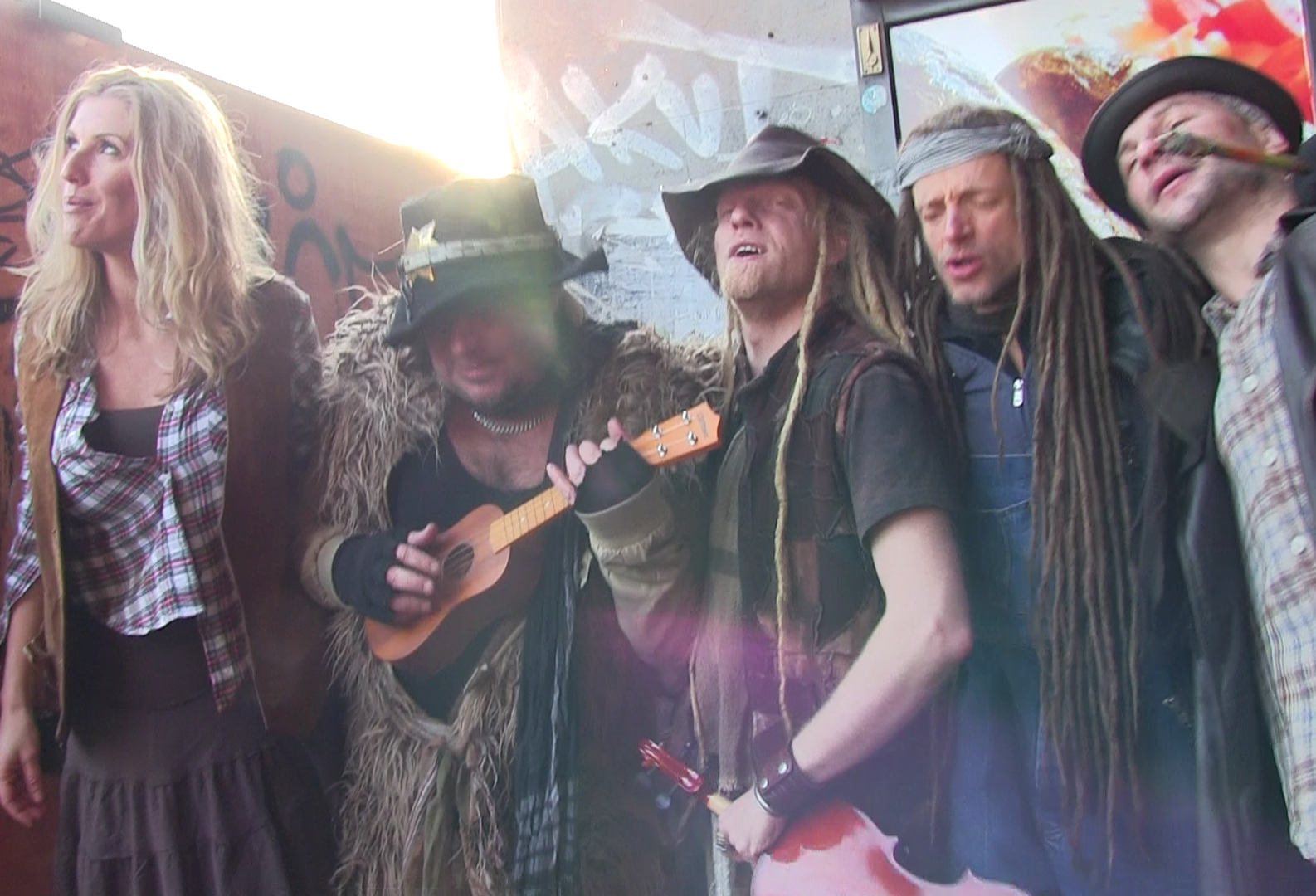

The discography of Rednex, a Swedish dance group, consists of three studio albums, two compilation albums, one extended plays, 18 singles, including one as featured artist, 9 promotional singles, and 17 music videos, including one as featured artist. The first Rednex release was the debut studio album Sex & Violins in 1995, preceded by the massive chart hits "Cotton Eye Joe", a cover version, and "Old Pop in an Oak", both released in 1994. This success was followed with the sophomore release Farm Out in 2000, including the hit single "The Spirit of the Hawk". The album Best of the West, their first compilation album, followed in 2002. In 2012, a studio album titled Saturday Night Beaver was planned, but remains shelved.

== Albums ==
=== Studio albums ===
List of studio albums, with selected chart positions and certifications
Title	Details	Peak chart positions										Certifications (sales threshold)
Title	Details	SWE	AUS	AUT	CAN	FIN	NL	NOR	NZ	SWI	US	Certifications (sales threshold)
Sex & Violins	Release date: 27 February 1995; Label: Zomba; Formats: CD, cassette	3	71	2	37	1	27	2	21	1	68	IFPI AUT: Platinum; IFPI FIN: Platinum; MC: Platinum
Farm Out	Release date: 21 November 2000; Label: Jive; Formats: CD, cassette	60	—	34	—	—	—	—	—	16	—	
The Cotton Eye Joe Show	Release date: 2009; Label: Lek; Format: Download	—	—	—	—	—	—	—	—	—	—	
"—" denotes studio album that did not chart

=== Unreleased albums ===
Title	Details	Notes
Saturday Night Beaver	Release date: Unreleased (2012); Label: Muunshine Muusic; Format: CD	Shelved and cancelled due to low sales of the three singles "Devil's on the Loose", "Racing" and "The End". Another three promotional singles were "Desert Town", "The Hix Off" and "Raise Your Glass".

=== Compilation albums ===
Title	Details
The Best of the West	Release date: 10 February 2002; Label: Jive; Formats: CD, download
Cotton Eye Joe	Release date: 2003; Label: BMG; Formats: CD, download
Greatest Hits & Remixes	Release date: 2019, 2021 (Vinyl); Label: ZYX Music; Formats: CD, Vinyl, download

== Extended plays ==
Title	Details
Inbred with Rednex	Release date: 1995; Label: BMG; Format: CD

== Singles ==
List of singles, with selected chart positions and certifications
Year	Title	Peak chart positions										Certifications (sales threshold)	Album
Year	Title	SWE	AUS	AUT	FIN	GER	NL	NOR	SWI	UK	US	Certifications (sales threshold)	Album
1994	"Cotton Eye Joe"	1	8	1	1	1	1	1	1	1	25	GLF: Platinum; ARIA: Gold; BPI: 2× Platinum; BVMI: 2× Platinum; IFPI AUT: Platinum; IFPI NOR: 2× Platinum; IFPI SWI: Platinum; NVPI: Gold; RIAA: Gold; RMNZ: 2× Platinum	Sex & Violins
1994	"Old Pop in an Oak"	1	70	1	1	2	11	1	2	12	—	BVMI: Platinum; IFPI AUT: Platinum; IFPI NOR: Platinum; IFPI SWI: Gold	Sex & Violins
1995	"Wish You Were Here"	3	—	1	6	1	26	1	1	—	—	BVMI: Platinum; IFPI AUT: Gold; IFPI SWI: Gold	Sex & Violins
1995	"Wild 'N Free"	37	—	12	11	18	—	—	24	55	—		Sex & Violins
1995	"Rolling Home"	32	—	18	—	42	—	—	—	81	—		Sex & Violins
1999	"The Way I Mate"	7	72	22	—	34	58	—	37	—	—		Farm Out
2000	"The Spirit of the Hawk"	10	—	1	—	1	78	—	3	—	—	BVMI: 3× Gold; IFPI AUT: Platinum; IFPI SWI: Gold	Farm Out
2000	"Hold Me for a While"	—	—	16	—	25	—	—	19	—	—		Farm Out
2001	"The Chase"	—	—	44	—	65	—	—	54	—	—		The Best of the West
2002	"Cotton Eye Joe 2003"	—	81	32	—	83	—	—	—	—	—		Cotton Eye Joe
2006	"Mama, Take Me Home"	3	—	—	—	—	—	—	—	—	—		The Cotton Eye Joe Show
2006	"Fe Fi (The Old Man Died)"	4	—	—	—	—	—	—	—	—	—		The Cotton Eye Joe Show
2007	"Anyway You Want Me"	8	—	—	—	—	—	—	—	—	—		The Cotton Eye Joe Show
2007	"Looking for a Star"	4	—	—	—	—	—	—	—	—	—		The Cotton Eye Joe Show
2008	"Football Is Our Religion"	1	—	—	—	59	—	—	—	—	—		The Cotton Eye Joe Show
2010	"Devil's on the Loose"	—	—	—	—	—	—	—	—	—	—		Non-album singles
2012	"Racing"	—	—	—	—	—	—	—	—	—	—		Non-album singles
2012	"The End"	—	—	—	—	—	—	—	—	—	—		Non-album singles
2016	"Innit for the Money"	—	—	—	—	—	—	—	—	—	—		Non-album singles
2018	"Manly Man"	—	—	—	—	—	—	—	—	—	—		Non-album singles
2025	"Poor Boy Pour"	—	—	—	—	—	—	—	—	—	—		
2026	"Cryin' Me Blind"	—	—	—	—	—	—	—	—	—	—		
2026	"Nothing Ever Happens in Brunkeflo"	—	—	—	—	—	—	—	—	—	—		
2026	"Bullfrog"	—	—	—	—	—	—	—	—	—	—		
"—" denotes single that did not chart

=== Featured singles ===
List of featured singles
Year	Title	Album
1996	"Children" (As part of the supergroup "Hand in Hand for Children")	Non-album single

=== Promotional singles ===
List of promotional singles, with selected chart positions
Year	Title	Album
1995	"Ein Bisschen Frieden" (Note: "Ein Bisschen Frieden" has been labeled as "Collo Rossi" for the promotional release.)	Non-album single
1997	"Riding Alone"	Sex & Violins
2007	"Well-O-Wee" (featuring Ro-Mania)	The Cotton Eye Joe Show
2007	"With Bells On"	The Cotton Eye Joe Show
2008	"Railroad, Railroad" (featuring Ro-Mania)	The Cotton Eye Joe Show
2009	"Desert Town"	Non-album singles
2011	"Raise Your Glass"	Non-album singles
2012	"The Hix Off" (Note: "The Hix Off" has been sublabeled "Live" on the promotional release, which says it is the intro used for live performances.)	Non-album singles
2016	"Innit for the Money"	
2021	"Nowhere in Idaho"	
"—" denotes promotional single that did not chart

== Music videos ==
Year	Title	Director(s)
1994	"Cotton Eye Joe"	
1994	"Old Pop in an Oak"	
1995	"Wish You Were Here"	
1995	"Wild 'N Free"	
1995	"Rolling Home"	
1999	"The Way I Mate"	
2000	"The Spirit of the Hawk"	Patric Ullaeus
2000	"Hold Me for a While"	Patric Ullaeus
2000	"The Devil Went Down to Georgia" (Note: "The Devil Went Down to Georgia" uses the same animated music video by Mike Johnson labeled by the band as the official video, previously released by Primus in 1998.)	Mike Johnson
2001	"The Chase"	Patric Ullaeus
2002	"Cotton Eye Joe (Remix)"	Patric Ullaeus
2007	"Well-O-Wee" (featuring Ro-Mania)	
2008	"Football Is Our Religion"	
2010	"Devil's on the Loose"	Emil Henricsson
2012	"Racing"	Patrick Edenberg
2012	"The End"	Patrick Edenberg
2016	"Innit for the Money"	
2021	"Nowhere in Idaho"	

=== Featured music videos ===
Year	Title	Director(s)
1996	"Children" (As part of the supergroup "Hand in Hand for Children")	
