= The Best of the West =

Greatest hits album by Rednex
- Released: 2002
- Recorded: 1994–2002
- Genre: Electronica, country, house
- Label: Jive Records
- Producer: F.A.F., Krusher K., Pat Reiniz, Snowboy, Utti

Rednex chronology
Farm Out (2000)	The Best of the West (2002)	Cotton Eye Joe (2003)

Singles from The Best of the West
- 1. "The Chase" Released: 5 November 2001; 2. "Cotton Eye Joe (Remix)" Released: 2002

The Best of the West is the first compilation album released by Swedish dance group Rednex compiling almost all previously released Rednex singles, except the promotional single "Riding Alone". The album is the second and final release through Jive Records.

== Background ==
Following the success of the previous single release "The Spirit of the Hawk" and the second studio album Farm Out, Rednex released their first compilation album The Best of the West in 2002.

== Content ==
The Best of the West consists of 15 songs, six of them, "Old Pop in an Oak", "Wish You Were Here", "Cotton Eye Joe" in its original and a remix version, "Rolling Home" and "Wild 'N Free", which have been previously released as singles from Sex & Violins in 1995. Four tracks, "Spirit Of The Hawk", "The Way I Mate", "The Devil Went Down To Georgia" and "Hold Me For A While", have been previously released as singles, except "The Devil Went Down To Georgia", which only received a music video release, from Farm Out in 2000. The other five songs – "Are You Strong Enough", "The Song Of Silence", "Love Me Or Leave Me", "Ride The Hurricane's Eye" and "The Chase" – are previously unreleased new material, which latter mentioned has been released as the album's lead single, followed by the 2002 remix version of "Cotton Eye Joe". The only single release excluded on this album is the promotional single "Riding Alone", released in 1997. The vocals on the new material are by Julie-Anne Tulley, while Annika Ljungberg's and Mia Löfgren's vocals are still featured on the old material from their Sex & Violins and Farm Out eras.

== Track listings ==
1. "Cotton Eye Joe (Remix)" – 3:33
2. "Spirit Of The Hawk" – 4:01
3. "Old Pop In An Oak" – 3:31
4. "Wish You Were Here" – 3:55
5. "Are You Strong Enough" – 3:42
6. "The Way I Mate" – 3:37
7. "The Song Of Silence" – 3:39
8. "Love Me Or Leave Me" – 4:04
9. "The Devil Went Down To Georgia" – 3:35
10. "Ride The Hurricane's Eye" – 3:18
11. "Hold Me for a While" – 4:44
12. "The Chase" – 3:10
13. "Cotton Eye Joe" – 3:12
14. "Rolling Home" – 4:41
15. "Wild 'N Free" – 3:38
