= Anders Lundström =

Swedish songwriter and record producer (born 1977)

Anders Lundström MAV
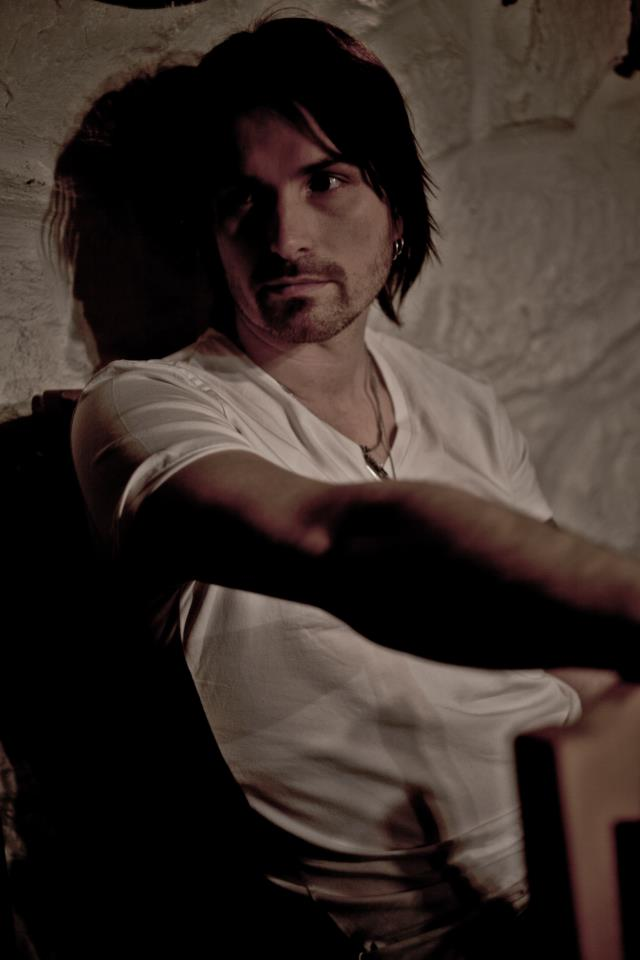
- Lundström in 2012

Background information
- Also known as: Maverick; MAV (country singer); A.L. Sweet; Lucka
- Born: 11 October 1977 (age 48); Stöde, Sundsvall Municipality, Sweden
- Genres: Pop
- Occupations: Singer, songwriter, record producer, musician
- Instruments: Vocals, guitar, keyboards, percussion
- Years active: 1999 – present
- Labels: Bolero Records, Saddle & Sabre Music
- Website: mavcountrymusic.com

Anders Lundström (born in Stöde, Sundsvall Municipality on 11 October 1977) is a Swedish songwriter and record producer. He is also a country recording artist who has released in January 2013 an album Stay True with the stage name MAV. At various times earlier in his career he was also known as A.L. Sweet, Lucka and during his Rednex days (2006–2008) as Maverick.

== Career ==
=== Superswede ===
Between 2001 and 2006, Lundström was a co-producer with Patrik Frisk, owner of Sidelake Studios in Sundsvall. In 2002, he toured as part of the band for Lutricia McNeal. Also from 2003 to 2006, he was the lead vocalist for the band Superswede. The Sundsvall-based rock band (originally known as Garbo, but in 2004 name changed to Superswede) was made up of Anders Lundström (vocals & guitar), Fredrik Hast (guitar), Ida Bengtsson (keyboards & vocals), David Tjernell (bass) and Kim Thalén (drums).

=== Rednex ===
In 2006 he participated in Melodifestivalen 2006 as part of a reformed Rednex in "Mama Take Me Home" made up of Mary Joe (main vocals), Maverick, Ace Ratclaw and Snake. Lundström would tour with the band using the name Maverick, a cooperation that went on from 2006 to 2008 with a string of hits including "Fe Fi (The Old Man Died)", "Anyway You Want Me", "Looking for a Star", "Football Is Our Religion" and a failed attempt for 2007 Romanian national final for Eurovision preselection, together with the Romanian band Ro-Mania, performing "Well-o-Wee", and a second attempt at 2008 Romanian preselection for Eurovision, singing "Railroad Railroad" again featuring the band Ro-Mania.

After an earlier band set-up made up of Scarlet, Dagger, Ace Ratclaw and Joe Cagg were reinstated as Rednex, Maverick continued touring with Mary Joe (Annika Ljungberg) and her husband Snake (Jens Sylsjö) as "The Cotton Eye Joe Show" until end of 2008, but with legal opposition from the returning Rednex AB management headed by Ranis Edenberg.

=== Producing and songwriting ===
Besides his Melodifestivalen experience in 2006, Lundström has also produced "Pame" for Daniel Mitsogiannis in Melodifestivalen 2008, did the arrangement for The Moniker song "Oh My God!" in Melodifestivalen 2011 and produced "Ge aldrig upp" for Thomas Di Leva in Melodifestivalen 2012. In 2011, he had co-produced a full album for Di Leva titled Hjärtat Vinner Alltid.

As a songwriter, he has produced, co-produced or written songs for Rednex, Superswede, Carola Häggkvist, Lutricia McNeal, Da Möb, Uno Svenningsson, Chill del Sol, Thomas Di Leva, Psychosomatic Cowboys, Date, Adam Story, Cue, Panetoz, The Moniker, Louis Sebastian, Peter Jöback, BWO and others.

=== Solo: Maverick / MAV ===
In early 2009, after Maverick left "The Cotton Eye Joe Show", he continued to use the name Maverick releasing his own independent single "Pretending" in 2009 a rock song co-produced by Lundström and Patrik Frisk. A prospective album to be recorded in the States with songs written amongst others by Jeff Franzel and Alex Forbes was announced but did not materialize.

In 2012 he ventured on a solo singing career as a country singer under the name MAV (a reminder of his Rednex days as Maverick). "I Like the Loneliness" is his debut single from his debut album Stay True released on 28 January 2013 on Bolero Recordings.

== Discography ==
=== Albums ===
as MAV

- 2013: Stay True

Tracklist

1. "Too Late" (3:06)
2. "I'll Leave My Heart" (3:13)
3. "Breathe" (3:27)
4. "Find a Way" (3:52)
5. "I Like the Loneliness" (3:16)
6. "In and Out of Pain" (4:23)
7. "In the Afterlife" (3:45)
8. "He's You and Me" (3:21)
9. "Artificial Self-Esteem" (2:48)
10. "Stay True" (4:07)
11. "Inevitable" (4:23)

=== Singles ===
as part of Rednex (2006–2008)

- 2006: "Mama Take Me Home"
- 2006: "Fe Fi (The Old Man Died)"
- 2007: "Anyway You Want Me"
- 2007: "Looking for a Star"
- 2008: "Railroad, Railroad"
- 2008: "Football Is Our Religion"

as Maverick

- 2009: "Pretending"

as MAV

- 2013: "I Like the Loneliness"
- 2013: "Breathe"

=== Productions / co-productions ===
- 2001: Carola – My Show
- 2002: Lutricia McNeal – Metroplex
- 2003: Da Möb – Hådast av dom hårda
- 2004: Monica Starck – Desert Flower
- 2004: Lutricia McNeal – Soul Sister Ambassador (European Edition)
- 2004: Uno Svenningsson – "Andas genom mig" (single)
- 2005: Lutricia McNeal – Rise (Japanese Version of Soul Sister Ambassador)
- 2006: Uno Svenningsson – Så underbart (Sånger för December)
- 2008: Rednex – Thank God I'm a Country Boy
- 2008: One Voice – Gospel Classics 2008
- 2009: Chill del Sol – Under the Palms, Warm Nights
- 2009: Maverick (Anders Lundström) – "Pretending" (single)
- 2010: Peter Gustafsson – En annan man
- 2010: Thomas Di Leva – Love Star
- 2010: Thomas Di Leva – "Sträck ut din hand" (single)
- 2010: Psychosomatic Cowboys – Intoxication
- 2010: Date – Här och nu
- 2011: Thomas Di Leva – Hjärtat vinner alltid
- 2011: Thomas Di Leva – "Välkommen hem" (single)
- 2011: Thomas Di Leva – "Julens Stjärna" (single)
- 2011: Vinni – "Sommerfuggel i vinterland" (Hver gang vi møtes, Norway) (single)
- 2011: Adam Story – Forward Rewind (EP)
- 2012: Susanne Fellbrink – Vilken känsla
- 2012: Psychosomatic Cowboys – 90 Proof
- 2012: Susanne Fellbrink – "Jag kommer hem igen" (single)
- 2012: Thomas Di Leva – "Ge aldrig upp" (Melodifestivalen) (single)
- 2012: Adam Story – "The River" (single)
- 2013: Cue – Back to See This Place
- 2013: Uno Svenningsson – Semester (Varm sommarversion)
- 2013: Susanne Fellbrink – "Ensam" (single)
- 2013: Mindful feat. Uri Geller – "Bend & Melt" (single)
- 2013: Panetoz – "Vissla med mig" (single)

=== Songwriting ===
- 2003: Da Möb – "Hårdast av dom hårda"
- 2004: Lutricia McNeal – "All That Matters" / "Rise" / "Shake Your Whatozee" / "Soulsister Ambassador"
- 2005: Superswede – "Automatic Children"
- 2006: Uno Svenningsson – "Så underbart"
- 2008: One Voice – "Long Long Way to Christmas Day"
- 2009: Chill del Sol – "Under the Palms, Warm Nights"
- 2010: Psychosomatic Cowboys – "In and Out of Pain", "White Collar Greed"
- 2010: Date – "Då kommer känslorna"
- 2011: The Moniker – "Oh My God!" (arrangement)
- 2011: Louis Sebastian – "Take Me Higher", "Rewarded", "Just a Word Away"
- 2011: Thomas Di Leva – "Julens stjärna"
- 2012: MAV – "I Like the Loneliness"
- 2013: Mindful feat. Uri Geller – "Bend & Melt"
- 2013: Panetoz – "Vissla med mig"

=== Remixes ===
(with Emil Hellman / Soundfactory)

- 2002: Afrodite – "Never Let It Go"
- 2007: Peter Jöback – "Stockholm i natt"
- 2007: The Ark – "Prayer for the Weekend"
- 2008: Disco Ormene – Disco Inferno 2008 (Soundfactory & Mavelicious)
- 2008: Daniel Mitsogiannis – Pame 2008
- 2008: Ani Lorak – "Shady Lady"
- 2008: Sanna Nielsen – "Empty Room"
- 2008–2009: BWO – "Lay Your Love on Me" / "Barcelona" / "Bells of Freedom" / "You're Not Alone"
