= List of number-one singles of 1994 (Finland) =

This is the list of the number-one singles of the Finnish Singles Chart in 1994.

== History ==
Week	Artist	Song
1	Ace of Base	"The Sign"
2	Bryan Adams, Rod Stewart & Sting	"All for Love"
3	Bryan Adams, Rod Stewart & Sting	"All for Love"
4	Bryan Adams, Rod Stewart & Sting	"All for Love"
5	Jam & Spoon	"Right in the Night"
6	Jam & Spoon	"Right in the Night"
7	Jam & Spoon	"Right in the Night"
8	Cappella	"Move on Baby"
9	Dr. Alban	"Look Who's Talking"
10	Dr. Alban	"Look Who's Talking"
11	Dr. Alban	"Look Who's Talking"
12	Dr. Alban	"Look Who's Talking"
13	Taikapeili	"Jos sulla on toinen"
14	Taikapeili	"Jos sulla on toinen"
15	Taikapeili	"Jos sulla on toinen"
16	Taikapeili	"Jos sulla on toinen"
17	Metallica	"One"
18	Metallica	"One"
19	U96	"Inside Your Dreams"
20	2 Unlimited	"The Real Thing"
21	2 Unlimited	"The Real Thing"
22	2 Unlimited	"The Real Thing"
23	The Prodigy	"No Good (Start the Dance)"
24	Cappella	"U & Me"
25	Cappella	"U & Me"
26	Mariah Carey	"Anytime You Need a Friend"
27	DJ BoBo	"Everybody"
28	DJ BoBo	"Everybody"
29	Jam & Spoon	"Find Me (Odyssey to Anyoona)"
30	WestBam	"Wizards of the Sonic"
31	Youssou N'Dour & Neneh Cherry	"7 Seconds"
32	Westbam	"Wizards of the Sonic"
33	Klamydia	"Huipulla tuulee"
34	Snap!	"Welcome to Tomorrow (Are You Ready?)"
35	Snap!	"Welcome to Tomorrow (Are You Ready?)"
36	Snap!	"Welcome to Tomorrow (Are You Ready?)"
37	Wet Wet Wet	"Love Is All Around"
38	The Prodigy	"Voodoo People"
39	Rednex	"Cotton Eye Joe"
40	Madonna	"Secret"
41	Rednex	"Cotton Eye Joe"
42	Madonna	"Secret"
43	DJ BoBo	"Let the Dream Come True"
44	Moby	"Feeling So Real"
45	Moby	"Feeling So Real"
46	Rednex	"Old Pop in an Oak"
47	Rednex	"Old Pop in an Oak"
48	Rednex	"Old Pop in an Oak"
49	Rednex	"Old Pop in an Oak"
50	Rednex	"Old Pop in an Oak"
51	Mo-Do	"Super Gut"
