= The Cotton Eye Joe Show =

Studio album by Rednex
- Released: 2009
- Recorded: 2006–2008
- Genre: Pop, country, dance
- Length: 40:54
- Label: Lek Records
- Producer: Annika Ljungberg

Rednex chronology
Cotton Eye Joe (2003)	The Cotton Eye Joe Show (2009)	Saturday Night Beaver (2012)

Singles from The Cotton Eye Joe Show
- 1. "Mama, Take Me Home" Released: 2006; 2. "Fe Fi (The Old Man Died)" Released: November 2006; 3. "Anyway You Want Me" Released: 7 March 2007; 4. "Looking for a Star" Released: 2007; 5. "Football Is Our Religion" Released: 2008

The Cotton Eye Joe Show is the third studio album by Swedish dance group Rednex. It has been independently released in 2009 in the Netherlands via Lek Records. It marks the second release to feature original lead singer Annika Ljungberg, who rejoined Rednex and replaced the previous female vocalist Julie-Anne Tulley, when she departed from the group. On January 1, 2009, however Ljungberg again left the band after the release due to the ending of Ljungberg's management licence, when control of the Rednex brand returned to the band's founders.

== Background ==
Following the releases of the previous albums in 2002 and 2003, their first and second compilation albums The Best of the West and Cotton Eye Joe, and the two single releases "The Chase" and the 2000 version of "Cotton Eye Joe", and a short break, the band returned in 2006 with their original lead singer Annika Ljungberg, who rejoined Rednex and replaced the previous female vocalist Julie-Anne Tulley.

== Composition ==
Unlike the band's previous studio albums "Sex & Violins" and "Farm Out", which have as similar amount on dance/country, classic country songs and ballads, "The Cotton Eye Joe Show" is a more pop album with softer classic country songs.

== Content ==
The album contains 13 songs, compiling all recordings between 2006 and 2008 with Annika Ljungberg as the female lead singer. Five singles, "Mama, Take Me Home", "Fe Fi (The Old Man Died)", "Anyway You Want Me", "Looking for a Star" and "Football Is Our Religion", have been previously released out of the album, which all of them proved to be surprisingly successful in the Swedish Single Chart respectively. The promotional singles were "With Bells On", "Well-O-Wee" and "Railroad, Railroad", with the first mentioned being a Kenny Rogers & Dolly Parton cover, and the latter two mentioned, both featuring Romanian group Ro-Mania, and being Romanian national pre-selections for the Eurovision Song Contest 2007 and the Eurovision Song Contest 2008. "Football Is Our Religion" served as the unofficial song to the 2008 UEFA European Football Championship which took place in Austria and Switzerland in June 2008.

== Track listing ==
1. "Fe Fi (The Old Man Died)" – 3:14
2. "Well-O-Wee" (featuring Ro-Mania) – 3:00
3. "Louisiana" – 3:05
4. "Anyway You Want Me" - 3:01
5. "Football Is Our Religion" - 3:33
6. "Looking for a Star" - 3:15
7. "Railroad, Railroad" (featuring Ro-Mania) – 2:55
8. "Mama, Take Me Home" - 3:01
9. "Run Runaway" - 3:08
10. "Thank God I'm a Country Boy" - 3:00
11. "Dead Mans Hand" - 3:36
12. "With Bells On" - 2:46
13. "Hi Ho Silver" - 3:04

== Personnel ==
- Annika Ljungberg – vocals
- Jens Sylsjö – vocals, violin
- Tor Penten – vocals, violin
- Anders Sandberg – vocals, violin
- Björn Scheffler – vocals, violin
- Anders Lundström – vocals, violin
