= Inbred with Rednex =

EP by Rednex
- Released: 1995
- Recorded: 1994–1995
- Length: 15:23
- Label: BMG Interactive
- Producer: Pat Reiniz

Rednex chronology
Sex & Violins (1995)	Inbred with Rednex (1995)	Farm Out (2000)

Singles from Inbred With Rednex
- 1. "Cotton Eye Joe" Released: August 12, 1994; 2. "Old Pop in an Oak" Released: November 17, 1994; 3. "Wish You Were Here" Released: May 6, 1995

Inbred with Rednex, sometimes misread as "In Bred with Rednex", is the first EP by Swedish dance group Rednex. The album was recorded and released in Germany in 1995 through BMG Interactive.

== Background ==
Following the success of the previous single releases "Cotton Eye Joe", "Old Pop in an Oak" and "Wish You Were Here" and the debut studio album Sex & Violins, Rednex released their first extended play in 1995.

== Content ==
The Inbred with Rednex extended play contains seven songs, three of them, "Cotton Eye Joe", "Old Pop in an Oak" and "Wish You Were Here", which had been previously released as singles. While "Cotton Eye Joe" and "Wish You Were Here" only appear in video form on the album, "Old Pop in an Oak" appears in both, video and audio form. The other five songs are four previously unreleased songs and one remix of "Cotton Eye Joe", labeled the "Öban Remix". The first track of the disc contains the interactive multimedia part "Inbred With Rednex", a point 'n' click adventure game starring Rednex, playable only for Windows & Mac PCs. The whole release is housed in an 18x23cm game box. Two of the previously unreleased four songs, "So long Johnny" and "The Whore in San Pedro", can only be played in a CD-ROM player.

== Appearances ==
The single "Old Pop in an Oak" previously appeared on Rednex's debut studio album Sex & Violins.

== Track listing ==
No.	Title	Writer(s)	Producer(s)	Length
1.	"Inbred with Rednex" (Multimedia Part)
2.	"Cotton Eye Joe" (Öban Remix)	Janne Ericsson; Örjan Öberg; Patrick Edenberg	Reiniz	4:46
3.	"Old Pop in an Oak"	Edenberg	Reiniz	3:31
4.	"Ropin' a Cow"	Öberg	Öberg	4:12
5.	"Crying Me Blind"	Edenberg	Reiniz	2:54
Total length:				15:23

Inbred with Rednex Multimedia Part
No.	Title	Writer(s)	Producer(s)	Length
1.	"So Long Johnny"	Annika Ljungberg	Stefan Een	2:46
2.	"The Whore in San Pedro"	Een	Een	3:43
3.	"Cotton Eye Joe" (Video)	Ericsson; Öberg; Edenberg	Reiniz	3:12
4.	"Old Pop in an Oak" (Video)	Edenberg	Reiniz	3:31
5.	"Wish You Were Here" (Video)	Leskelä Teijo; Dag Volle; Karl Sandberg	Denniz Pop; Max Martin	3:56
Total length:				17:08

Notes

- The interactive multimedia part "Inbred with Rednex" can only be played in CD-Rom players.

== Personnel ==
- Rednex – vocals
