= Eins, Zwei, Polizei =

1994 single by Mo-Do

Single by Mo-Do

from the album Was Ist Das?
- Language: German
- English title: "One, Two, Police"
- Released: 1994
- Genre: Eurodance; techno
- Length: 5:12 (album version); 3:25 (radio edit)
- Label: Expanded Music
- Songwriters: Fabio Frittelli; Mario Pinosa; Sergio Portaluri; Fulvio Zafret; Claudio Zennaro
- Producer: Claudio Zennaro

Mo-Do singles chronology
"Eins, Zwei, Polizei" (1994)	"Super Gut" (1994)

Music video
- "Eins, Zwei, Polizei" on YouTube

"Eins, Zwei, Polizei" (English: "One, Two, Police") is a song co-written and recorded by Italian dance musician Mo-Do (a.k.a. Fabio Frittelli) and released in 1994, by label Expanded Music, as the debut single from his first and only album, Was Ist Das? (1995). The song got its inspiration from "Der Kommissar" by Austrian singer Falco and "Da Da Da" by German band Trio, both released in the early 1980s. It was co-produced by Claudio Zennaro and Fulvio Zafret, and achieved great success in many European countries. "Eins, Zwei, Polizei" reached the number-one position in Austria, Germany and Italy. Giuseppe Capotondi directed the accompanying music video. The song has been remixed and re-released several times. In 1995, it was remixed by DJ XTC of Chile, in 2000, it was re-released in a remix by Maurizio Ferrara, in 2008 with remixes by German DJ Blutonium Boy and Floorfilla, and in 2019, the song was reworked by Dutch-Turkish DJ Ummet Ozcan.

== Background and release ==
The song was born out of a chance meeting of Italian dance music producer Einstein Dr. DJ and Italian model and musician Fabio Frittelli (Mo-Do) at a rave party in Frankfurt, Germany. The lyrics Eins, Zwei, Polizei come from a nursery rhyme Einstein's Austrian grandmother used to sing to him. The track's sound epitomized European dance trends at the time and managed to break big without English lyrics, but was not a big hit in the UK. According to ZYX UK manager John Richards, "Eins, Zwei, Polizei" got little response in the UK "mainly because of the German vocal". However, it became a European-wide success and was also released in the US on 15 August 1994. Mark Dezzani from Billboard magazine described the song as a "techno-lullaby".

== Chart performance ==
"Eins, Zwei, Polizei" was a commercial success across Europe, remaining Fabio Frittelli's biggest hit. It peaked at number-one in Austria (7 weeks), Germany (4 weeks) and Italy (2 weeks), with a total of 18, 22 and 23 weeks inside the singles charts. In Belgium, Denmark and the Netherlands, it peaked at number two, being kept off the number-one position by Wet Wet Wet's "Love Is All Around", Rednex' "Cotton Eye Joe" and Marco Borsato's "Dromen Zijn Bedrog". The single was a top-10 hit also in Finland (3), France (8), Spain (3), Sweden (9) and Switzerland (5), as well as on the Eurochart Hot 100, where it reached number four in September 1994, after 16 weeks on the chart. In the United Kingdom and Scotland, "Eins, Zwei, Polizei" reached numbers 81 and 76 in its first week at the UK Singles Chart and the Scottish Singles Chart on 9 October 1994. In Austria and Belgium, it ended up at numbers six and 18 on the countries' year-end chart.

The single earned a gold record in both Austria and Germany, with a sale of 25,000 and 250,000 units.

== Music video ==
The music video for "Eins, Zwei, Polizei" was directed by Giuseppe Capotondi, an Italian director of feature films, music videos and commercials. It features Mo-Do performing at a crowded party in a hotelroom. The video was A-listed on German music television channel VIVA in September 1994. It also received active rotation on MTV Europe one month later. "Eins, Zwei, Polizei" was made available on Expanded Music's official YouTube channel in 2015, and as of late 2025, the video had generated more than 68 million views on the platform.

== Track listings ==
- CD single
1. "Eins, Zwei, Polizei" (gendarmerie mix - radio edit) – 3:20
2. "Eins, Zwei, Polizei" (gendarmerie mix) – 5:12
- CD maxi
1. "Eins, Zwei, Polizei" (radio mix) – 3:12
2. "Eins, Zwei, Polizei" (gendarmerie mix) – 5:12
3. "Eins, Zwei, Polizei" (club mix) – 5:05
4. "Eins, Zwei, Polizei" (Einstein Dr. DJ Konzept) – 4:05
5. "Eins, Zwei, Polizei" (akkappella) – 0:55
- CD maxi
1. "Einz, Zwei, Polizei" (gendarmerie mix) – 5:12
2. "Einz, Zwei, Polizei" (extended remix) – 7:25
3. "Einz, Zwei, Polizei" (polizei mix) – 5:25
- 7-inch single
1. "Eins, Zwei, Polizei" (gendarmerie mix) – 5:12
2. "Eins, Zwei, Polizei" (club mix) – 5:05
- 12-inch maxi
1. "Eins, Zwei, Polizei" (gendarmerie mix)
2. "Eins, Zwei, Polizei" (club mix)
3. "Eins, Zwei, Polizei" (Einstein Dr. DJ Konzept)
4. "Eins, Zwei, Polizei" (akkappella)
- CD maxi - Remixes
1. "Eins, Zwei, Polizei" (radio edit) – 3:25
2. "Eins, Zwei, Polizei" (extended remix) – 7:26
3. "Eins, Zwei, Polizei" (polizei mix) – 5:25
4. "Eins, Zwei, Polizei" (original radio mix) – 3:12
5. "Eins, zwei, Polizei" (gendarmerie mix) – 5:12
6. "Eins, zwei, Polizei" (Einstein Dr. DJ Konzept) – 4:05
- 12-inch maxi - Remixes
1. "Eins, Zwei, Polizei" (extended remix) – 7:26
2. "Eins, Zwei, Polizei" (polizei mix) – 5:25
3. "Eins, Zwei, Polizei" (radio edit) – 3:25

== Charts ==
=== Weekly charts ===
Weekly chart performance for "Eins, Zwei, Polizei"
Chart (1994)	Peak position
Austria (Ö3 Austria Top 40)	1
Belgium (Ultratop 50 Flanders)	2
Belgium (VRT Top 30 Flanders)	2
Belgium (Ultratop 50 Wallonia)	1
Denmark (IFPI)	2
Europe (Eurochart Hot 100)	4
Europe (European Dance Radio)	6
Finland (Suomen virallinen lista)	3
France (SNEP)	8
Germany (Media Control)	1
Italy (Musica e dischi)	1
Netherlands (Dutch Top 40)	2
Netherlands (Single Top 100)	3
Scotland (OCC)	76
Spain (AFYVE)	3
Sweden (Sverigetopplistan)	9
Switzerland (Schweizer Hitparade)	5
UK Singles (OCC)	81

=== Year-end charts ===
Year-end chart for "Eins, Zwei, Polizei"
Chart (1994)	Position
Austria (Ö3 Austria Top 40)	6
Belgium (Ultratop 50 Flanders)	6
Europe (Eurochart Hot 100)	20
France (SNEP)	23
Germany (Media Control)	18
Italy (Musica e dischi)	8
Netherlands (Dutch Top 40)	30
Netherlands (Single Top 100)	23
Sweden (Topplistan)	62
Switzerland (Schweizer Hitparade)	13

== Certifications ==
Certifications for "Eins, Zwei, Polizei"
Region	Certification	Certified units/sales
Austria (IFPI Austria)	Gold	25,000^{*}
Germany (BVMI)	Gold	250,000^{^}
^{*} Sales figures based on certification alone.^{^} Shipments figures based on certification alone.
