= Frittelli =

Frittelli is an Italian surname. Notable people with the surname include:

- Dylan Frittelli (born 1990), South African golfer
- Gino Frittelli (1879–1950), Italian painter
- Vincent Frittelli (born 1940), South African Violinist
- Fabio Frittelli (1966–2013), Italian musician
