= List of number-one hits of 1995 (Austria) =

This is a list of the Austrian Singles Chart number-one hits of 1995.

Issue date	Song	Artist
1 January	"Hey Süßer"	Lucilectric
8 January	"An Angel"	The Kelly Family
15 January	"An Angel"	The Kelly Family
22 January	"An Angel"	The Kelly Family
29 January	"Old Pop in an Oak"	Rednex
5 February	"Old Pop in an Oak"	Rednex
12 February	"Old Pop in an Oak"	Rednex
19 February	"Old Pop in an Oak"	Rednex
26 February	"Old Pop in an Oak"	Rednex
5 March	"Old Pop in an Oak"	Rednex
12 March	"Old Pop in an Oak"	Rednex
19 March	"Old Pop in an Oak"	Rednex
26 March	"Old Pop in an Oak"	Rednex
2 April	"Old Pop in an Oak"	Rednex
9 April	"Scatman (Ski-Ba-Bop-Ba-Dop-Bop)"	Scatman John
16 April	"Scatman (Ski-Ba-Bop-Ba-Dop-Bop)"	Scatman John
23 April	"Scatman (Ski-Ba-Bop-Ba-Dop-Bop)"	Scatman John
30 April	"Scatman (Ski-Ba-Bop-Ba-Dop-Bop)"	Scatman John
7 May	"Scatman (Ski-Ba-Bop-Ba-Dop-Bop)"	Scatman John
14 May	"Scatman (Ski-Ba-Bop-Ba-Dop-Bop)"	Scatman John
21 May	"Shut Up (and Sleep with Me)"	Sin with Sebastian
28 May	"Shut Up (and Sleep with Me)"	Sin with Sebastian
4 June	"Shut Up (and Sleep with Me)"	Sin with Sebastian
11 June	"Shut Up (and Sleep with Me)"	Sin with Sebastian
18 June	"Shut Up (and Sleep with Me)"	Sin with Sebastian
25 June	"Shut Up (and Sleep with Me)"	Sin with Sebastian
2 July	"Shut Up (and Sleep with Me)"	Sin with Sebastian
9 July	"Laß uns schmutzig Liebe machen"	Die Schröders
16 July	"Have You Ever Really Loved a Woman?"	Bryan Adams
23 July	"Wish You Were Here"	Rednex
30 July	"Wish You Were Here"	Rednex
6 August	"Wish You Were Here"	Rednex
13 August	"Wish You Were Here"	Rednex
20 August	"Wish You Were Here"	Rednex
27 August	"Wish You Were Here"	Rednex
3 September	"Wish You Were Here"	Rednex
10 September	"Wish You Were Here"	Rednex
17 September	"Wish You Were Here"	Rednex
24 September	"Wish You Were Here"	Rednex
1 October	"I Wanna Be a Hippy"	Technohead
8 October	"I Wanna Be a Hippy"	Technohead
15 October	"I Wanna Be a Hippy"	Technohead
22 October	"I Wanna Be a Hippy"	Technohead
29 October	"Knockin'"	Double Vision
5 November	"Knockin'"	Double Vision
12 November	"Knockin'"	Double Vision
19 November	"Knockin'"	Double Vision
26 November	"Knockin'"	Double Vision
3 December	"Knockin'"	Double Vision
10 December	"Knockin'"	Double Vision
17 December	"Gangsta's Paradise"	Coolio featuring L.V.
24 December	"Gangsta's Paradise"	Coolio featuring L.V.
31 December	"Gangsta's Paradise"	Coolio featuring L.V.

== See also ==
- 1995 in music
