= Mama, Take Me Home (Rednex song) =

Single by Rednex

from the album The Cotton Eye Joe Show
- Released: 2006
- Recorded: 2006
- Genre: Pop, country
- Length: 3:01
- Label: M&L Records
- Songwriter(s): Matthews Green, Michael Clauss
- Producer(s): Annika Ljungberg

Rednex singles chronology
"Cotton Eye Joe 2002" (2002)	"Mama, Take Me Home" (2006)	"Fe Fi (The Old Man Died)" (2006)

"Mama, Take Me Home", sometimes "Mama Take Me Home", is a song by Swedish dance group Rednex. It has been released in 2006 through M&L Records as the first single of their independently released third studio album The Cotton Eye Joe Show. The song marks the first release with Annika Ljungberg, who rejoined the band.

== Background ==
After the group's previous single release, the 2002 Remix of Cotton Eye Joe and their first greatest hits compilation The Best of the West in 2002, Rednex returned in 2006 with new material, the song "Mama, Take Me Home". The song also marks the first release with Annika Ljungberg, who rejoined the band.

== Composition ==
In contrast of their previous releases, which were a mixture of dance/techno with country elements, and pop ballads, "Mama, Take Me Home" is a more classical country song with a softer beat, similar to their previous release "Riding Alone". The song is completely unrelated to the 1970s country song Mama Take Me Home by country singer George Jones.

== Commercial performance ==
"Mama, Take Me Home" was released and entered into the Melodifestivalen (Music Festival) in Gothenburg, Sweden. Melodifestivalen is the Swedish national annual music competition organized by Swedish public television broadcasters for the Eurovision Song Contest. The song came in 3rd in the semi-final, and took part in the Second Chance round, which it won. In the final, the song finished in 6th place. "Mama, Take Me Home" was subsequently released as a single in a few European countries in 2006. In addition to a CD single, the single was released intact on iTunes. It became a hit in Sweden, where it peaked #3 in the Swedish Single Chart respectively.

== Track listing ==
1. "Mama, Take Me Home" - 2:59
2. "Mama, Take Me Home (Singback Mix)" - 2:59

== Charts ==
=== Weekly charts ===
Chart (2006)	Peak position
Sweden (Sverigetopplistan)	3

=== Year-end charts ===
Chart (2006)	Position
Sweden (Sverigetopplistan)	34
