= List of number-one hits of 1995 (Denmark) =

This is a list of the Danish Singles Chart number-one hits of 1995 from the International Federation of the Phonographic Industry and Nielsen Soundscan. They were provided through Billboard magazine under the "Hits of the World" section.

== Chart history ==
| Issue date | Song | Artist |
|---|---|---|
| 7 January | "Old Pop In An Oak" | Rednex |
| 14 January | "Old Pop In An Oak" | Rednex |
| 21 January | "Old Pop In An Oak" | Rednex |
| 28 January | "Old Pop In An Oak" | Rednex |
| 4 February | "Zombie" | The Cranberries |
| 11 February | "Stay Another Day" | East 17 |
| 18 February | "Stay Another Day" | East 17 |
| 25 February | "Here Comes The Hotstepper" | Ini Kamoze |
| 4 March | "Scatman (Ski Ba Bop Ba Dop Bop)" | Scatman John |
| 11 March | "Scatman (Ski Ba Bop Ba Dop Bop)" | Scatman John |
| 18 March | "Scatman (Ski Ba Bop Ba Dop Bop)" | Scatman John |
| 25 March | "Scatman (Ski Ba Bop Ba Dop Bop)" | Scatman John |
| 1 April | "Scatman (Ski Ba Bop Ba Dop Bop)" | Scatman John |
| 8 April | "Sarajevos Børn - Gi' Dem Et Håb" | Various artists |
| 15 April | "Sarajevos Børn - Gi' Dem Et Håb" | Various artists |
| 22 April | "Sarajevos Børn - Gi' Dem Et Håb" | Various artists |
| 29 April | "Sarajevos Børn - Gi' Dem Et Håb" | Various artists |
| 6 May | "Sarajevos Børn - Gi' Dem Et Håb" | Various artists |
| 13 May | "Sarajevos Børn - Gi' Dem Et Håb" | Various artists |
| 20 May | "Sarajevos Børn - Gi' Dem Et Håb" | Various artists |
| 27 May | "Sarajevos Børn - Gi' Dem Et Håb" | Various artists |
| 3 June | "Self Esteem" | The Offspring |
| 10 June | "Back For Good" | Take That |
| 17 June | "21 Go'nat Historier" | Timm & Gordon |
| 24 June | "21 Go'nat Historier" | Timm & Gordon |
| 1 July | "21 Go'nat Historier" | Timm & Gordon |
| 8 July | "21 Go'nat Historier" | Timm & Gordon |
| 15 July | "21 Go'nat Historier" | Timm & Gordon |
| 22 July | "21 Go'nat Historier" | Timm & Gordon |
| 30 July | "Dub-I-Dub" | Me & My |
| 6 August | "Dub-I-Dub" | Me & My |
| 13 August | "Dub-I-Dub" | Me & My |
| 25 August | "Dub-I-Dub" | Me & My |
| 6 September | "Dub-I-Dub" | Me & My |
| 13 September | "Dub-I-Dub" | Me & My |
| 20 September | "Dub-I-Dub" | Me & My |
| 27 September | "Dub-I-Dub" | Me & My |
| 4 October | "Dub-I-Dub" | Me & My |
| 11 October | "Tør Du La' Vær'?" | Timm & Gordon |
| 18 October | "Tør Du La' Vær'?" | Timm & Gordon |
| 25 October | "Tør Du La' Vær'?" | Timm & Gordon |
| 2 November | "Tør Du La' Vær'?" | Timm & Gordon |
| 9 November | "Gangsta's Paradise" | Coolio featuring L.V. |
| 16 November | "Gangsta's Paradise" | Coolio featuring L.V. |
| 23 November | "Gangsta's Paradise" | Coolio featuring L.V. |
| 30 November | "Gangsta's Paradise" | Coolio featuring L.V. |
| 7 December | "Gangsta's Paradise" | Coolio featuring L.V. |
| 14 December | "Gangsta's Paradise" | Coolio featuring L.V. |
| 21 December | "Gangsta's Paradise" | Coolio featuring L.V. |
| 28 December | "Gangsta's Paradise" | Coolio featuring L.V. |

== See also ==
- 1995 in music
