= Farm Out =

...Farm Out

Studio album by Rednex
- Released: 29 May 2000
- Recorded: 1999–2000
- Length: 45:07
- Label: Jive
- Producer: Pat Reiniz; Janne Ericsson; Anders Hansson; David Millington; Stefan Sir Een; Leskelä Teijo; Anders Hellquist; Thomas Hegert

Rednex chronology
Inbred with Rednex (1995)	...Farm Out (2000)	The Best of the West (2002)

Singles from Farm Out
- 1. "The Way I Mate" Released: August 1999; 2. "The Spirit of the Hawk" Released: 28 February 2000; 3. "Hold Me for a While" Released: 21 June 2000

Farm Out (stylized as ...farm out!) is the second studio album by Swedish dance group Rednex through Jive Records. It is the first and only album to feature the female lead singer Mia Löfgren, who replaced original singer Annika Ljungberg, who departed the group. Löfgren herself left the band after the album's third single release due to disagreements with the producers and other band members.

== Content ==
The album contains 18 songs, three of which are the singles "The Way I Mate", "The Spirit of the Hawk" and "Hold Me for a While" that were released from the album. Unlike the first album, Farm Out featured an intro track "Fresh Pigs and More" and three interludes, titled "Boring...", "Animal in the Rain" and "Message from Our Sponsors". The song "McKenzie Brothers II (Continued...)", as the title reveals, is a continuation of the story previously told in their song "McKenzie Brothers" from Sex & Violins. "The Devil Went Down to Georgia" is a cover version of the 1979 song by the Charlie Daniels Band. While Sex & Violins has the same amount of dance/country, classic country songs and ballads, Farm Out is full of their dance/country-style songs only, except one ballad, "Hold Me for a While", and one country song, "Ranger Jack". The song "Bottleneck Bob", subtitled as the "2000 version", appears for the first time on a Rednex album, which had been previously released in a remixed version, titled the "Run Like Hell Mix", as a B-side on their single "Rolling Home". Although Ljungberg was not involved in the production of this album, her vocals are still featured on the "Message from Our Sponsors" interlude, which flashbacks Rednex's super hits including "Wish You Were Here", and on the album version of "Bottleneck Bob".

== Commercial performance ==
Although in the same vein as their debut album, this album was not as successful as Sex & Violins.

== Track listings ==
Standard edition

1. "Fresh Pigs and More" (Intro) – 1:00
2. "The Spirit of the Hawk" – 3:57
3. "The Way I Mate" – 3:43
4. "The Devil Went Down to Georgia" – 3:35
5. "Hold Me for a While" – 4:44
6. "Boring..." (Interlude) – 0:28
7. "Where You Gonna Go" – 3:23
8. "Maggie Moonshine" – 4:20
9. "Animal in the Rain" (Interlude) – 0:11
10. "Ranger Jack" – 4:15
11. "Get the Truck Loaded" – 3:43
12. "Message from Our Sponsors" (Interlude) – 0:49
13. "Is He Alive" – 3:22
14. "McKenzie Brothers II (Continued...)" – 3:58
15. "Bottleneck Bob" – 3:38

Asian edition bonus tracks

16. "Here I Am" – 3:54
17. "We're in It for the Money" – 3:17

Australian edition bonus tracks

16. "Here I Am" – 3:54
17. "We're in It for the Money" – 3:17
18. "Come Closer to Me" – 4:08

Australian mispress bonus tracks

16. "Here I Am" – 3:54
17. "We're in It for the Money" – 3:17
18. "Swamp Love" – 2:51

== Charts ==
Chart performance for Farm Out
Chart (2000)	Peak position
Austrian Albums (Ö3 Austria)	34
German Albums (Offizielle Top 100)	18
Swedish Albums (Sverigetopplistan)	60
Swiss Albums (Schweizer Hitparade)	16
