= Rolling Home (song) =

Single by Rednex

from the album Sex & Violins
- Released: 5 December 1995
- Recorded: 1994
- Genre: Country pop; christmas
- Length: 4:41
- Label: Jive Records
- Songwriters: Jan Ericsson and Lizette von Panajott
- Producer: Michael B. Tretow

Rednex singles chronology
"Wild 'N Free" (1995)	"Rolling Home" (1995)	"The Way I Mate" (1999)

Music video
- "Rolling Home" on YouTube

"Rolling Home" is a Christmas-themed song by Swedish band Rednex, released in December 1995 by Jive Records as the last single from the band's debut album, Sex & Violins (1995). The song is written by Jan Ericsson and Lizette von Panajott, and produced by Michael B. Tretow. Lead vocals are performed by Annika Ljungberg. It was a top-20 hit in Austria (18), a top-40 hit in the band's native Sweden (32) and a top-50 hit in Germany (42). The music video for "Rolling Home" features the band performing the song in a winter-landscape. It was filmed in the Swedish North Pole area and shot in black-and-white.

== Critical reception ==
Pan-European magazine Music & Media wrote, "Legendary ABBA producer Tretow has turned this Dolly Parton-like album track into a splashing Christmas song with a great abundance of sleighbells, drums and choir girls. Note the unexpected twist at the end. This one is sure to break some borders in December."

== Track listing ==
1. "Rolling Home" (Tretow's Treatment - Radio) - 4:41
2. "Rolling Home" (Tretow's Treatment - Long) - 6:30
3. "Bottleneck Bob" (Run Like Hell Mix) - 3:39
4. The Ultimate Rednex Mega Mix - "Old Pop in an Oak" - 1:08
5. The Ultimate Rednex Mega Mix - "Wish You Were Here" - 0:23
6. The Ultimate Rednex Mega Mix - "Cotton Eye Joe" - 1:00
7. The Ultimate Rednex Mega Mix - "Riding Alone" - 0:51
8. The Ultimate Rednex Mega Mix - "Fat Sally Lee" - 1:00
9. The Ultimate Rednex Mega Mix - "Wild 'N Free" - 1:23
10. "Old Pop in an Oak" (DJ Cerla + Moratto Remix) - 5:08
11. "Old Pop in an Oak" (One More Mix) - 4:52

== Charts ==
Chart (1995)	Peak position
Austria (Ö3 Austria Top 40)	18
Europe (Eurochart Hot 100)	84
Germany (GfK)	42
Scotland (OCC)	97
Sweden (Sverigetopplistan)	32
UK Singles (OCC)	81
