= Gino Frittelli =

Italian painter

Gino Frittelli (31 May 1879 – 13 January 1950) was an Italian painter.

== Biography ==
He was born near Florence, and he enrolled in the Accademia di Belle Arti of Florence, then under the leadership of Giovanni Fattori. Here he studies ornamentation, including the artisanship of ceramic or figure making. Part of his life was dedicated to such work, and part was dedicated to painting. His outdoor painting of landscapes was influenced directly by the Florentine School of Macchiaoli painters. He lived and worked Orvieto from 1922 to 1935. He died in Trieste.
