= Fe Fi (The Old Man Died) =

Single by Rednex

from the album The Cotton Eye Joe Show
- Released: November 2006
- Recorded: 2006
- Genre: Pop, country
- Length: 3:15
- Label: Pyjama Records
- Songwriter(s): Matthews Green, Michael Clauss
- Producer(s): Annika Ljungberg

Rednex singles chronology
"Mama Take Me Home" (2006)	"Fe Fi (The Old Man Died)" (2006)	"Well-O-Wee" (2007)

"Fe Fi (The Old Man Died)", or simply "Fe Fi", is a country song by the Swedish band Rednex. It has been released in November 2006 through Pyjama Records as the second single of their independently released third studio album The Cotton Eye Joe Show.

== Background ==
After a slump in their commercial appeal, Rednex made a minor comeback with their 2006 single "Mama, Take Me Home". Their comeback continued when this single in November 2006, after having performed it at the Nickelodeon Kids' Choice Awards.

== Commercial performance ==
"Fe Fi (The Old Man Died)" was surprisingly successful, reaching #4 in the Swedish Single Chart respectively.

== Track listing ==
1. "Fe Fi (The Old Man Died)" - 3:15
2. "Fe Fi (The Old Man Died)" (Instrumental) - 3:16

== Charts ==
=== Weekly charts ===
Chart (2006)	Peak position
Sweden (Sverigetopplistan)	4

=== Year-end charts ===
Chart (2006)	Position
Sweden (Sverigetopplistan)	44
