= Football Is Our Religion =

Single by Rednex

from the album The Cotton Eye Joe Show
- B-side: "Thank God I'm a Country Boy"
- Released: 2008
- Recorded: 2008
- Genre: Country
- Length: 3:34
- Label: Universal Records
- Songwriter(s): Alex Christensen, Peter Könemann
- Producer(s): Alex Christensen

Rednex singles chronology
"Railroad, Railroad" (2008)	"Football Is Our Religion" (2008)	"With Bells On" (2008)

"Football Is Our Religion" is a country-dance song by the Swedish band Rednex, released in 2008 via Universal Records, as the fifth single of their independently released third studio album The Cotton Eye Joe Show. The song serves as the unofficial song to UEFA Euro 2008 which took place in Austria and Switzerland in June of that year.

== Track listing ==
1. "Football Is Our Religion" (Single Mix) - 3:34
2. "Football Is Our Religion" (Extended Mix) - 4:29
3. "Football Is Our Religion" (Alex C. Remix) - 4:15
4. "Thank God I'm a Country Boy" - 3:00

== Charts ==
Chart (2008)	Peak position
Germany (GfK)	59
Sweden (Sverigetopplistan)	1
