= Super Gut =

Single by Mo-Do

from the album Was Ist Das?
- Released: 21 November 1994
- Recorded: 1994
- Studio: Palace Recordings Studios, Udine, Italy.
- Genre: Eurodance
- Length: 3:35 (radio version)
- Label: Plastika (Italy)
- Songwriters: Mario Pinosa; Sergio Portaluri; Fulvio Zafret; Claudio Zennaro

Mo-Do singles chronology
"Eins, Zwei, Polizei" (1994)	"Super Gut" (1994)	"Gema Tanzen" (1995)

Music video
- "Super Gut" on YouTube

"Super Gut" is a song recorded by Italian dance act Mo-Do, released in November 1994 as the second single from their only album, Was Ist Das? (1995). The song was the follow-up to their successful European hit-single "Eins, Zwei, Polizei" and reached number one in Finland. It was also a notable hit in European countries like Austria, Belgium, Germany, Latvia, Sweden and Switzerland. On the Eurochart Hot 100, "Super Gut" peaked at number 19. It was released via various labels: Plastika, ZYX Music, Hit Plus, Scorpio Music. The accompanying music video was directed by Giuseppe Capotondi, who had previously directed the video for "Eins, Zwei, Polizei".

== Track listing ==
All tracks are written by Mario Pinosa, Sergio Portaluri, Fulvio Zafret, Claudio Zennaro.

No.	Title	Length
1.	"Super Gut" (Radio Edit)	3:35
2.	"Super Gut" (Super Gut Mix)	5:54
3.	"Super Gut" (Wunderschon Mix)	5:10
4.	"Super Gut" (Einstein Konzept)	5:00
5.	"Eins, Zwei, Polizei" (Gendarmerie Mix)	5:12
6.	"Eins, Zwei, Polizei" (Extended Remix)	7:26

== Charts ==
=== Weekly charts ===
Chart (1994–1995)	Peak position
Austria (Ö3 Austria Top 40)	11
Belgium (Ultratop 50 Flanders)	7
Belgium (Ultratop 50 Wallonia)	4
Europe (Eurochart Hot 100)	19
Finland (Suomen virallinen lista)	1
France (SNEP)	30
Germany (GfK)	26
Israel (Israeli Singles Chart)	27
Sweden (Sverigetopplistan)	20
Switzerland (Schweizer Hitparade)	18

=== Year-end charts ===
Chart (1995)	Position
Latvia (Latvijas Top 50)	45
