= Looking for a Star =

Single by Rednex

from the album The Cotton Eye Joe Show
- Released: 2007
- Recorded: 2007
- Genre: Country, electronic
- Length: 3:18
- Label: MMS Records
- Songwriter(s): Sebastian Fronda, Michael Clauss, Jens Sylsjö, Karin Ljungberg
- Producer(s): Annika Ljungberg

Rednex singles chronology
"Anyway You Want Me" (2007)	"Looking for a Star" (2007)	"With Bells On" (2007)

"Looking for a Star" is a country-dance song by the Swedish band Rednex, released in 2007 via MMS Records, as the fourth single of their independently released third studio album The Cotton Eye Joe Show.

== Track listing ==
1. "Looking for a Star (Original Single Version)" - 3:18
2. "Looking for a Star (Instrumental Version)" - 3:18

== Charts ==
Chart (2007)	Peak position
Sweden (Sverigetopplistan)	4
