= Anyway You Want Me (Rednex song) =

Single by Rednex

from the album The Cotton Eye Joe Show
- Released: 7 March 2007
- Recorded: 2007
- Genre: Country
- Length: 3:02
- Label: Universal Records
- Songwriter(s): Aleena Gibson, Bobby Ljunggren
- Producer(s): Annika Ljungberg

Rednex singles chronology
"Well-O-Wee" (2007)	"Anyway You Want Me" (2007)	"Looking for a Star" (2007)

"Anyway You Want Me" is a country-dance song by the Swedish band Rednex, released on March 7, 2007 via Universal Records, as the third single of their independently released third studio album The Cotton Eye Joe Show.

== Track listing ==
1. "Anyway You Want Me" (Single Version) - 3:03
2. "Anyway You Want Me" (Instrumental Version) - 3:01

== Charts ==
Chart (2007)	Peak position
Sweden (Sverigetopplistan)	8
