= Hold Me for a While =

Single by Rednex

from the album Farm Out
- Released: 21 June 2000
- Recorded: 1999
- Length: 4:44 (album version); 3:16 (radio edit)
- Label: Zomba Records
- Songwriters: Teijo Agélii-Leskelä, Ranis
- Producer: Utti

Rednex singles chronology
"The Spirit of the Hawk" (2000)	"Hold Me for a While" (2000)	"The Chase" (2001)

"Hold Me for a While" is a pop ballad by the Swedish band Rednex, released from their second album Farm Out as the third and final single. It was the last single to feature the second female lead singer Whippy (Mia Löfgren), after she left the band in 2001, before she rejoined in 2015.

Vietnamese version is: "Bình minh sẽ mang em đi" (by Đàm Vĩnh Hưng) .

== Track listing ==
1. "Hold Me for a While" (Radio Edit) – 3:16*
2. "Hold Me for a While" (Alternative Radio Edit) – 3:40
3. "Hold Me for a While" (Album Version) – 4:44
4. "Hold Me for a While" (The Midnight Sun Remix) – 5:52

* Track duration incorrectly listed as 3:38 instead of 3:16

== Charts ==
Chart (2000)	Peak position
Austria (Ö3 Austria Top 40)	16
Germany (GfK)	25
Switzerland (Schweizer Hitparade)	19
