= The Way I Mate =

2000 single by Rednex

Single by Rednex

from the album Farm Out
- Released: December 1999
- Length: 3:46
- Label: Jive
- Songwriter(s): Pat Reiniz
- Producer(s): Pat Reiniz

Rednex singles chronology
"Rolling Home" (1997)	"The Way I Mate" (1999)	"The Spirit of the Hawk" (2000)

"The Way I Mate" is a song by the Swedish band Rednex, released from their second album, Farm Out, in December 1999. In keeping with the title of the song, moaning can be heard faintly in the background, especially near the end.

== Track listing ==
1. "The Way I Mate" (single version) – 3:46
2. "The Way I Mate" (extended version) – 6:57
3. "The Way I Mate" (Rally remix) – 5:12
4. "The Way I Mate" (L.A. dub) – 8:31
5. "The Way I Mate" (Gaelic mix) – 5:56
6. "The Way I Mate" (Karaoke D.I.Y.) – 3:44

== Charts ==
=== Weekly charts ===
Chart (2000)	Peak position
Australia (ARIA)	72
Austria (Ö3 Austria Top 40)	22
Germany (GfK)	34
Netherlands (Single Top 100)	58
Sweden (Sverigetopplistan)	7
Switzerland (Schweizer Hitparade)	37

=== Year-end charts ===
Chart (2000)	Position
Sweden (Hitlistan)	81
