= Mo-Do =

Background information
- Born: Fabio Frittelli; 24 July 1966
- Origin: Monfalcone, Italy
- Died: 6 February 2013 (aged 46) Udine, Italy
- Genre: Eurodance
- Years active: 1994–2000
- Labels: Dancing Ferret, ZYX Music, Metronome Records, Flex Records, Full Access

Fabio Frittelli (24 July 1966 – 6 February 2013), better known by his pseudonym Mo-Do, was an Italian musician. Mo-Do appeared in the 1990s as an Italian electronic music act. Although Mo-Do was Italian, his songs were in German.

== Biography ==
Mo-Do was best known for the single "Eins, Zwei, Polizei" (co-produced with Zennaro and Zafret) which reached No. 1 in the German, Austrian and Italian music charts.

Frittelli was found dead at his home in Italy on 7 February 2013, at age 46. Police ruled his death a suicide.

== Discography ==
=== Album ===
- Was ist das? (Metronome Records, 1995)

=== Singles ===
Year	Single	Peak chart positions								Certifications (sales thresholds)	Album
Year	Single	ITA	AUT	FIN	FRA	GER	NL	SWE	SWI	Certifications (sales thresholds)	Album
1994	"Eins, Zwei, Polizei"	1	1	3	8	1	2	9	5	AUT: Gold; GER: Gold	Was ist das?
1994	"Super Gut"	—	11	1	30	26	—	20	18		Was ist das?
1995	"Gema tanzen"	—	—	—	—	—	—	—	—		Was ist das?
1996	"Sex Bump Twist"*	—	—	—	—	—	—	—	—		Was ist das?
1999	"Superdisco (Cyberdisco)										Non-album single
"—" denotes releases that did not chart.

* Non-album single; only appeared on the Lithuanian CD release of Was ist das? as a bonus track
