= Wild 'N Free =

Single by Rednex

from the album Sex & Violins
- Released: 4 September 1995
- Recorded: 1995
- Genre: Country; happy hardcore
- Length: 3:39
- Songwriters: Anders Hansson; John Francis; Pat Reiniz
- Producer: Pat Reiniz

Rednex singles chronology
"Wish You Were Here" (1995)	"Wild 'N Free" (1995)	"Rolling Home" (1995)

Music video
- "Wild 'N Free" on YouTube

"Wild 'N Free" is a country-dance song by the Swedish band Rednex, released as the fourth single from their debut album, Sex & Violins. Its techno-country dance style is built around a re-recorded sample of "The Infernal Galop" from Act II, Scene 2 from Jacques Offenbach's Orpheus in the Underworld. The song appeared in the 2006 Paramount Pictures and Nickelodeon Movies film Barnyard in the scene where the character Wild Mike dances.

== Critical reception ==
James Hyman from British magazine Music Week's RM Dance Update commented, "Someone had to give the can-can a stompin' Euro-novelty workout. At least Rednex have done it in style with interesting production and remixes that include the slower Nightcrawlers/Robin-S sounding ones from Rhythm on the Loose." Another editor, James Hamilton described it as a "fiddles scraped and 'French Can Can' whistled corny Village People-ish pop chanter". Chuck Campbell from Scripps Howard News Service wrote that "Rednex pull their oddest move with "Wild and Free", a hyper can-can/country/techno/neo-Village People free-for-all."

== Music video ==
The music video for "Wild 'N Free" was directed by Van Der Berg.

== Track listings ==
1. "Wild 'N Free" (Original Mix) – 3:39
2. "Wild 'N Free" (Remix Edit) – 3:52
3. "Wild 'N Free" (Original Extended) – 4:54
4. "Wild 'N Free" (Remix Extended) – 4:46

== Charts ==
Chart (1995)	Peak position
Austria (Ö3 Austria Top 40)	12
Finland (Suomen virallinen lista)	11
Germany (GfK)	18
Netherlands (Dutch Top 40 Tipparade)	9
Netherlands (Dutch Single Tip)	9
Scotland (OCC)	44
Sweden (Sverigetopplistan)	37
Switzerland (Schweizer Hitparade)	24
UK Singles (Official Charts)	55
