= The Spirit of the Hawk =

2000 single by Rednex

Single by Rednex

from the album Farm Out
- B-side: "Ranger Jack"
- Released: 7 August 2000
- Length: 3:57 (album version); 4:03 (F.A.F. radio mix)
- Label: Jive
- Songwriter: Axel Breitung
- Producer: F.A.F.

Rednex singles chronology
"The Way I Mate" (1999)	"The Spirit of the Hawk" (2000)	"Hold Me for a While" (2000)

Music video
- "The Spirit of the Hawk" on YouTube

"The Spirit of the Hawk" is a song by Swedish musical group Rednex released from their second album, Farm Out (2000). The lyrics include the spoken lines "My people, some of them, have run away to the hills, and have no shelter, no food. No one knows where they are. Hear me, my chiefs! I am tired; my heart is sick and sad. I will fight no more.", taken from Chief Joseph's famous speech.

Released in August 2000, the song topped the charts of Austria and Germany while reaching the top 10 in Sweden and Switzerland. The track is certified triple gold in Germany, platinum in Austria, and gold in Sweden and Switzerland. In 2010, "The Spirit of the Hawk" was ranked as Germany's ninth-most-successful hit of the 2000s decade.

== Track listings ==
European CD single

1. "The Spirit of the Hawk" (F.A.F. radio mix) – 4:03
2. "The Spirit of the Hawk" (instrumental) – 4:03

European maxi-CD single

1. "The Spirit of the Hawk" (F.A.F. radio mix) – 4:03
2. "The Spirit of the Hawk" (instrumental) – 4:03
3. "The Spirit of the Hawk" (F.A.F.'s "Heap Bigg" remix) – 5:57
4. "Ranger Jack" – 4:17

== Charts ==
=== Weekly charts ===
Chart (2000)	Peak position
Austria (Ö3 Austria Top 40)	1
Europe (Eurochart Hot 100)	5
Germany (GfK)	1
Netherlands (Single Top 100)	78
Sweden (Sverigetopplistan)	10
Switzerland (Schweizer Hitparade)	3

=== Year-end charts ===
Chart (2000)	Position
Austria (Ö3 Austria Top 40)	3
Europe (Eurochart Hot 100)	32
Germany (Media Control)	2
Sweden (Hitlistan)	74
Switzerland (Schweizer Hitparade)	18

Chart (2001)	Position
Austria (Ö3 Austria Top 40)	49

=== Decade-end charts ===
Chart (2000–2009)	Position
Austria (Ö3 Austria Top 40)	12
Germany (Media Control GfK)	9

== Certifications ==
Region	Certification	Certified units/sales
Austria (IFPI Austria)	Platinum	50,000^{*}
Germany (BVMI)	3× Gold	750,000^{^}
Sweden (GLF)	Gold	15,000^{^}
Switzerland (IFPI Switzerland)	Gold	25,000^{^}
^{*} Sales figures based on certification alone.^{^} Shipments figures based on certification alone.

== Release history ==
Region	Date	Format(s)	Label	Ref.
Germany	7 August 2000	CD; maxi-CD	Jive	
