= Mama Take Me Home =

Single by George Jones
- Released: 1972
- Recorded: 1972
- Genre: Country
- Length: 2:59
- Label: Zomba Records
- Songwriter(s): George Jones
- Producer(s): George Jones

"Mama Take Me Home" is a song by Country Music Singer George Jones, released in the early 1970s. Country singer Charlie Rich covered the song in 1973.

== Background ==
George Jones recorded "Mama Take Me Home" in 1972. This country music song was released by Jones and appeared his 1972 LP album First in the Hearts of Country Music Lovers. The author of the original country song titled "Mama Take Me Home" was singer-songwriter Carmol Taylor. Charlie Rich covered "Mama Take Me Home" in 1973. This country music song was released by Rich and appeared on his 1973 LP Album I Do My Swinging At Home. The song is also found on the Rich's posthumous 2001 CD re-release of the 1973 LP album Behind Closed Doors.

== Composition ==
Lyrically, Rich's version is virtually identical to Jones' version, with the exception on the first few words of the song. The George Jones version of the song starts with "A drunk man, crossed the street today, he staggered all around...". The Charlie Rich version of the song starts with "I saw a man walk, from a bar today and stagger, all around...". On The George Jones Show airing on The Nashville Network in 1999, country singer Sammy Kershaw described this song, that he'd heard only once, as a young child, as one of the most "memorable" and "saddest songs" he'd ever heard in his life. Kershaw cited George Jones as a heavy influence of his own music. In 2006, Swedish dance group Rednex recorded a song titled "Mama, Take Me Home", which is completely unrelated to the country song recorded by Jones.
