= Old Pop in an Oak =

1994 single by Rednex

Single by Rednex

from the album Sex & Violins
- Released: 1994
- Studio: Future Crew (Stockholm, Sweden)
- Genre: Country and western; dance; techno-pop
- Length: 3:30
- Label: Jive; Zomba
- Songwriter: Pat Reiniz
- Producer: Pat Reiniz

Rednex singles chronology
"Cotton Eye Joe" (1994)	"Old Pop in an Oak" (1994)	"Wish You Were Here" (1995)

Music video
- "Old Pop in an Oak" on YouTube

"Old Pop in an Oak" is a song recorded by Swedish band Rednex, released in 1994, by Jive and Zomba, as the second single from their debut album, Sex & Violins (1995). Lead vocals are by band members Göran Danielsson and Annika Ljungberg, and it was both written and produced by Pat Reiniz (a.k.a. Patrick Edenberg). The song reached number-one in many countries, including Austria, Belgium, Denmark, Finland, and Sweden. In the UK, it peaked at number 12. The accompanying music video was directed by Stefan Berg.

== Composition ==
When asked about the similarities between the band's first single "Cotton Eye Joe" and "Old Pop in an Oak", singer Annika Ljungberg (a.k.a. Mary Joe in Rednex) told in an 1995-interview, "The two melodies are completely different! The only thing that is similar is that techno beat but if you took that away and played it acoustically with violins and a banjo, then you can hear there's a very big difference. They are totally different songs, different stories. 'Cotton Eye Joe' was an old, trad song. But 'Old Pop in an Oak' is a whole new, original song that we dedicated to an old man in our village."

Pat Reiniz, producer and writer of the song, told in 2021, "When writing it, I was determined to use the same phonetics as in 'Cotton Eye Joe' (which I came to regret later) as an exercise to better understand what made the song sound "folky." So first the words were chosen (out of a long list of options with the same phonetics), then afterwards a "meaning" was attached to them and later a whole lyric was written. The story is that Old Pop is being chased up the oak by an angry grandma for doing some mischief by the BBQ."

== Chart performance ==
Like its predecessor, "Old Pop in an Oak" was very successful on the charts across Europe, remaining one of the group's biggest hits. It peaked at number-one in Austria (10 weeks), Denmark (4 weeks), Finland (5 weeks), Norway (6 weeks) and Sweden (6 weeks). Additionally, the single entered the top 10 also in Belgium (2), Germany (2), Iceland (6), the Netherlands (6), Scotland (8) and Switzerland (2), as well as on the Eurochart Hot 100, where it reached number two. In these countries, it was kept from the number-one position by The Cranberries' "Zombie" (in Belgium), Vangelis' "Conquest of Paradise" (in Germany) and Rednex' own "Cotton Eye Joe" (in Switzerland).

In the UK, "Old Pop in an Oak" debuted and peaked at number 12 in its first week at the UK Singles Chart, on March 19, 1995. It spent nine weeks within the UK Top 100. In France, it was a top-50 hit. Outside Europe, the single peaked at number 17 on the RPM Dance/Urban chart and number 53 on the RPM Top Singles chart in Canada. In West Asia, it became a top-20 hit in Israel, peaking at number 14 on April 4, 1995. In Oceania, it reached numbers seven and 70 in New Zealand and Australia, respectively. And in Africa, "Old Pop in an Oak" became a top-20 hit also in Zimbabwe, peaking at number 12.

"Old Pop in an Oak" earned a gold record in Switzerland (25,000) and a platinum record in Austria (50,000), Germany (500,000) and Norway.

== Critical reception ==
British Lennox Herald noted that "Old Pop in an Oak" is a "similar sounding song" to their previous single, 'Cotton Eye Joe'. A reviewer from Manila Standard described it as "techno-pop fun". Pieter Kops from Music & Media viewed it as a "C&W/dance mixture". Music Week constated that "Rednex regurgitate 'Cotton Eye Joe' – give or take the odd twang – and set out to prove that successfully following up a novelty number one isn't impossible." James Hamilton from the magazine's RM Dance Update declared it as a "speak of the devil, another thumbs in braces, boot stompin', high steppin' moonshine swiggin' gingham swirling Swedish disco hoedown much too much like their last one".

Also Chuck Campbell from Scripps Howard News Service deemed the song as a "very similar re-take" on the band's first hit. Pete Stanton from Smash Hits wrote, "The only difference between this song and 'Cotton Eye Joe' is that this one is called 'Old Pop in an Oak'. Anyway, what or who is old pop in an oak? Have they hidden Grandad in a tree? It sounds like they're singing Pop in my nose, one chicken here looks like Emmy Joe."

== Music video ==
The music video for "Old Pop in an Oak" was directed by Stefan Berg, who had previously directed the video for "Cotton Eye Joe". It was A-listed on German music television channel VIVA and received active rotation on MTV Europe in February 1995. On British The Box, the video was a Box Top for 7 weeks from March 1995.

== Track listing ==
- CD maxi
1. "Old Pop in an Oak" (Original Radio Edit) – 3:30
2. "Old Pop in an Oak" (Doug's Klub Mix) – 5:25
3. "Old Pop in an Oak" (Original Extended Mix) – 5:38
4. "Old Pop in an Oak" (Doug's Phantom Dub Mix) – 3:50
5. "Old Pop in an Oak" (Original Instrumental) – 3:20

== Personnel ==
Personnel are taken from the European maxi-single liner notes.

- Göran Danielsson – lead vocals
- Mary Joe (Annika Ljungberg) – lead vocals
- Christopher Sylvan Stewart, Cool James – backing vocals
- Ken Tacky – vocals, banjo
- Mup – bass drum
- Billy Ray – violin
- Bosse Nilsson – violin (additional)
- Bobby Sue – violin, harp
- Pat Reiniz – producer, engineer, writer
- John Wayne – recorder, mixer

== Charts ==
=== Weekly charts ===
Chart (1994–1995)	Peak position
Australia (ARIA)	70
Austria (Ö3 Austria Top 40)	1
Belgium (Ultratop 50 Flanders)	2
Belgium (Ultratop 50 Wallonia)	32
Canada Dance/Urban (RPM)	17
Canada Top Singles (RPM)	53
Denmark (IFPI)	1
Europe (Eurochart Hot 100)	2
Europe (European Dance Radio)	20
Europe (European Hit Radio)	28
Finland (Suomen virallinen lista)	1
France (SNEP)	50
Germany (GfK)	2
Iceland (Íslenski Listinn Topp 40)	6
Ireland (IRMA)	11
Israel (Israeli Singles Chart)	14
Netherlands (Dutch Top 40)	6
Netherlands (Single Top 100)	11
New Zealand (Recorded Music NZ)	7
Norway (VG-lista)	1
Quebec (ADISQ)	21
Scottish Singles Sales (Official Charts)	8
Sweden (Sverigetopplistan)	1
Switzerland (Schweizer Hitparade)	2
UK Singles (Official Charts)	12
UK Dance (Official Charts)	21
UK Airplay (Music Week)	29
UK Pop Tip Club Chart (Music Week)	21
Zimbabwe (ZIMA)	12

=== Year-end charts ===
Chart (1994)	Position
Netherlands (Dutch Top 40)	117
Sweden (Topplistan)	11

Chart (1995)	Position
Austria (Ö3 Austria Top 40)	2
Belgium (Ultratop 50 Wallonia)	56
Europe (Eurochart Hot 100)	21
Germany (Media Control)	16
Iceland (Íslenski Listinn Topp 40)	82
Latvia (Latvijas Top 50)	23
Netherlands (Dutch Top 40)	185
Norway Winter Period (VG-lista)	1
Sweden (Topplistan)	55
Switzerland (Schweizer Hitparade)	11

=== Decade-end charts ===
Chart (1990–1999)	Position
Austria (Ö3 Austria Top 40)	96

== Certifications and sales ==
Region	Certification	Certified units/sales
Austria (IFPI Austria)	Platinum	50,000^{*}
Germany (BVMI)	Platinum	500,000^{^}
Norway (IFPI Norway)	Platinum	
Switzerland (IFPI Switzerland)	Gold	25,000^{^}
^{*} Sales figures based on certification alone.^{^} Shipments figures based on certification alone.

== See also ==
- List of number-one hits of 1995 (Austria)
- List of number-one hits of 1995 (Denmark)
- List of number-one singles of 1994 (Finland)
- List of number-one singles and albums in Sweden
- List of number-one songs in Norway
- Ultratop 50 number-one hits of 1995
