= Sex & Violins =

Studio album by Rednex
- Released: 27 February 1995
- Recorded: 1994
- Genres: Electronic country; Eurodance; pop
- Length: 46:59
- Labels: Battery; Jive
- Producers: Pat Reiniz; Janne Ericsson; Anders Hansson; Denniz Pop; Max Martin; David Millington; Stefan Sir Een; Leskelä Teijo; Anders Hellquist; Thomas Hegert

Rednex chronology
Sex & Violins (1995)	Inbred with Rednex (1995)

Singles from Sex & Violins
- 1. "Cotton Eye Joe" Released: 12 August 1994; 2. "Old Pop in an Oak" Released: 17 November 1994; 3. "Wish You Were Here" Released: 6 May 1995; 4. "Wild 'N Free" Released: 4 September 1995; 5. "Rolling Home" Released: 5 December 1995

Alternative cover
- Edited original cover for initial US release

Alternative cover
- Alternative cover for later US releases

Professional ratings
Review scores
Source	Rating
AllMusic	2/5 stars
Billboard	(favorable)
Entertainment Weekly	D
Knoxville News Sentinel	3/5 stars
Music & Media	(favorable)
Music Week	2/5 stars
Smash Hits	1/5 stars

Sex & Violins (also known on later US releases as Cotton Eye Joe (Sex & Violins)) is the debut studio album by Swedish Eurodance group Rednex, released on Jive Records in February 1995.

== Content ==
Female vocals on the album are provided by Annika Ljungberg; due to a disagreement with the other band members, she left the band after the release of the album's fifth single, "Rolling Home", in 1996, to start a solo career. The album was a commercial success, including the hit dance single "Cotton Eye Joe".

For its US release, the album was retitled Cotton Eye Joe (Sex & Violins) and received new cover art – presumably due to the possible offensive nature of the original artwork depicting a golden shower. In it an unseen person urinates into a chamber pot onto which the band members' faces are superimposed. Initially, the album cover was edited to leave out the stream but with the yellow liquid remaining. This would be substituted for wholly original artwork for a short time, which depicted a desert landscape with cacti warped by heat haze, but returned to the unedited original cover after a single pressing.

== Critical reception ==
David Browne from Entertainment Weekly said, "For sheer audaciousness, it’s not surprising that the record is garnering such attention. Where else can you hear a barn-dance staple gone techno, complete with dance-diva wailing and manic banjos and fiddles?" Pan-European magazine Music & Media stated, "What started off as a good joke with 'Cotton Eye Joe', could now very well become the best promotion for what is euphemistically called "New American Music". Dance can definitely bring country music closer to the masses than any strategic marketing campaign could before the Rednex popped up." Neil Spencer from The Observer wrote, "Swedish barn-dance disco: an initially amusing joke (chart-topping 'Cotton Eye Joe') repeated to the point of inanity." Jordan Paramor from Smash Hits was very negative to the album, giving it one out of five, but praised 'Wish You Were Here' as a "very lovely ballad".

== Track listing ==
Standard edition
No.	Title	Writer(s)	Producer(s)	Length
1.	"Cotton Eye Joe"	Janne Ericsson; Øban; Pat Reiniz	Reiniz	3:14
2.	"Hittin' the Hay"	Ericsson; Leskelä Teijo	Ericsson; Reiniz^{[a]}	3:17
3.	"Riding Alone"	Øban	Anders Hansson; Reiniz	3:27
4.	"Wish You Were Here"	Teijo	Denniz Pop; Max Martin	3:56
5.	"Mary Lou"	Stefan Sir Een; David Millington	Een; Millington	3:38
6.	"Old Pop in an Oak"	Reiniz	Reiniz	3:32
7.	"Nowhere in Idaho"	Teijo	Teijo	4:05
8.	"The Sad But True Story of Ray Mingus, the Lumberjack of Bulk Rock City, and His Never Slacking Strive to Exploit the So Far Undiscovered Areas of the Intention to Bodily Intercourse from the Opposite Species of His Kind, During Intake of All the Mental Conditions That Could Be Derived from Fermentation" ("Harder Than Your Husband" on Spotify)	Thomas Hegert; Anders Hellquist	Een; Hegert; Hellquist; Reiniz	2:21
9.	"Fat Sally Lee"	Reiniz	Reiniz	3:16
10.	"Shooter"	Ericsson; Lizette von Panajotte	Ericsson; Mr. Maple^{[a]}	3:44
11.	"McKenzie Brothers"	Hegert; Hellquist; Reiniz	Hegert; Hellquist; Reiniz	4:28
12.	"Rolling Home"	Ericsson; Panajotte	Ericsson	4:22
13.	"Wild and Free"	Reiniz; Hansson; John Francis	Hansson	3:39
Total length:				46:59

Cotton Eye Joe (Sex & Violins) – US bonus track
No.	Title	Writer(s)	Producer(s)	Length
14.	"Cotton Eye Joe" (Slide to the Side Mix)	Ericsson; Øban; Reiniz	Reiniz	4:14
Total length:				51:13

Japanese edition bonus tracks
No.	Title	Writer(s)	Producer(s)	Length
14.	"Cotton Eye Joe" (Madcow instrumental version)	Ericsson; Øban; Reiniz	Reiniz	4:49
15.	"Old Pop in an Oak" (extended mix)	Reiniz	Reiniz	5:39
16.	"Ropin' a Cow" (radio edit)	Öban	Öban	3:15
Total length:				60:42

Notes

- ^{^[a]} signifies a co-producer

1996 VCD edition
No.	Title	Length
14.	"The Ultimate Rednex Megamix"	5:45
15.	"Rolling Home" (New Version)	4:41
16.	"Old Pop in an Oak" (DJ Cerla + Moratto Remix)	5:08
17.	"Old Pop in an Oak" (West Side Story)	3:30

VCD
No.	Title	Length
1.	"Hieroglyph (Game)"

== Personnel ==
- Accordion – Ari Haatainen and Henrik Widén
- Banjo – Gary Johansson, General Custer, and Kjell Johansson
- Bass – Björn Lagberg
- Drums – Anders Lövmark, Animal, and Heffa
- Guitar – Anders Hellquist, Boba, Bonne Lövman, Clint Eastwood, and Henrik Jansson
- Steel guitar – Uffe Sterling
- Harmonica – Ove Sandberg
- Piano – Henrik Widén
- Violin – Bosse Nilsson
- Vocals – Anders Hansson, Annika Ljungberg, Björn Lagberg, Camena, Camilla Molinder, Chris Sylvan Stewart, Cool James, Currey, Göran Danielsson, Hanna Wannagárd, Henrik Widen, Hoss, Janne Ericsson, Jean-Paul Wall, Jeanette Söderholm, Joe Cartwright, Lotten Andersson, Ludde, Michelle Anenberg, Monte Reid, Pat Reiniz, Stefan Cevaco, Sir Een, Thomas Hegert, and Zeb Macahan
- Whistle – Jean-Paul Wall

=== Production ===
- Producers – Pat Reiniz, Janne Ericsson, Anders Hansson, Denniz Pop, Max Martin, David Millington, Stefan Sir Een, L. Teijo, Anders Hellquist, and Thomas Hegert
- Engineering assistant – Jacob Schultze

== Charts ==
=== Weekly charts ===
Weekly chart performance for Sex & Violins
Chart (1995)	Peak position
Australian Albums (ARIA)	71
Austrian Albums (Ö3 Austria)	2
Belgian Albums (Ultratop Flanders)	42
Belgian Albums (Ultratop Wallonia)	20
Canada Top Albums/CDs (RPM)	37
Dutch Albums (Album Top 100)	27
European Albums (European Top 100 Albums)	4
Finnish Albums (Suomen virallinen lista)	1
German Albums (Offizielle Top 100)	4
Hungarian Albums (MAHASZ)	2
New Zealand Albums (RMNZ)	21
Norwegian Albums (VG-lista)	2
Swedish Albums (Sverigetopplistan)	3
Swiss Albums (Schweizer Hitparade)	1
US Billboard 200	68

=== Year-end charts ===
1995 year-end chart performance for Sex & Violins
Chart (1995)	Position
Austrian Albums (Ö3 Austria)	16
Dutch Albums (Album Top 100)	85
European Albums (European Top 100 Albums)	21
German Albums (Offizielle Top 100)	17
Swedish Albums & Compilations (Sverigetopplistan)	69
Swiss Albums (Schweizer Hitparade)	7

== Sales and certifications ==
Certifications for Sex & Violins
Region	Certification	Certified units/sales
Austria (IFPI Austria)	Platinum	50,000^{*}
Canada (Music Canada)	Platinum	100,000^{^}
Finland (Musiikkituottajat)	Platinum	62,213
Germany (BVMI)	Gold	250,000^{^}
New Zealand (RMNZ)	Gold	7,500^{^}
Norway (IFPI Norway)	Platinum	50,000^{*}
Sweden (GLF)	Gold	50,000^{^}
Switzerland (IFPI Switzerland)	Platinum	50,000^{^}
^{*} Sales figures based on certification alone.^{^} Shipments figures based on certification alone.
