= Wish You Were Here (Rednex song) =

1995 single by Rednex

Single by Rednex

from the album Sex & Violins
- B-side: "Hittin' the Hay"
- Released: 10 April 1995
- Genre: Pop
- Length: 4:00
- Label: ZYX Music
- Songwriter: Teijo Agélii-Leskelä
- Producers: Denniz Pop; Max Martin

Rednex singles chronology
"Old Pop in an Oak" (1994)	"Wish You Were Here" (1995)	"Wild 'N Free" (1995)

Music video
- "Wish You Were Here" on YouTube

"Wish You Were Here" is a song by Swedish band Rednex from their first album, Sex & Violins (1995). Written by Teijo Agélii-Leskelä and produced by Denniz Pop and Max Martin, the ballad is performed by lead singer Annika Ljungberg and was released as the third single of the album in April 1995 by ZYX Music. It became a number-one hit in Austria, Germany, Norway, and Switzerland. In Austria, it was the most successful single of 1995. Additionally, the song reached number two in Iceland, number three in Israel and Sweden, and number six in Finland. The accompanying music video was directed by Matt Broadley and filmed in Spain.

== Critical reception ==
American magazine Billboard complimented the song as a "surprisingly sincere ballad". J.D. Considine from The Daily Gazette described it as "unexpectedly ABBA-esque" and "melancholy". Chuck Campbell from Knoxville News Sentinel called it a "leaden ballad". Howard Cohen for The Miami Herald named it one of "a few melodramatic instances" on the Sex & Violins album. Pan-European magazine Music & Media remarked that it focuses on a totally different side by the band, adding, "It's a ballad, sung with lots of Dolly-patented vibrato and pathos." M&M editor Thessa Mooij praised it as "a tastefully produced ballad, with its string accompaniment and exquisite harmonies." David Nagy from Red Deer Advocate wrote, "Just when the hillbilly party gets going, the band throws a contemporary pop ballad at you, and thoughts of ABBA come to mind." Jordan Paramor from Smash Hits was also very positive, saying, "Mind you, in amongst all the barn dance bobbins, there is a very lovely ballad to be found called 'Wish You Were Here'."

== Chart performance ==
"Wish You Were Here" reached number one in Austria, Germany, Norway, and Switzerland. It entered the top five in Iceland and Sweden, as well as on the Eurochart Hot 100, where it peaked at number five in July 1995, after 14 weeks on the chart. Additionally, "Wish You Were Here" was a top-10 hit in Denmark and Finland, and a top-30 hit in Belgium and the Netherlands. In Austria, it was the most successful single of 1995 after peaking at the top position for ten weeks, and it is also ranked number 11 on the Ö3 Austria Top 40 decade-end chart for 1990–1999. In both Germany and Switzerland, it was the third-most successful single of 1995. Outside Europe, it became a top-3 hit in Israel, peaking at number three on 13 June 1995. The song was awarded with a gold record in Austria and Switzerland and a platinum record in Germany and Norway.

== Music video ==
The music video for "Wish You Were Here" was directed by Swedish-based director Matt Broadley and has a sepia tone. It was filmed in Cádiz, Spain in March 1995. The video depicts a woman, Mary Joe, played by lead singer Annika Ljungberg, sitting in a meadow, singing to her man, a soldier who has been killed in a war. Other times we see the male band members dressed like soldiers, on a battlefield. They are shooting at each other and some of them being shot. In between, romantic flashbacks between the woman and the man takes us back to happier days. In the end, the woman walks through the battlefield at night with a torch in her hand. She watches and sings to the dead soldiers, lying on the ground. "Wish You Were Here" was A-listed on German music television channel VIVA in June 1995. It was later made available in HD on Rednex' official YouTube channel in 2013, and had generated more than 19 million views as of late 2025.

== Other versions ==
Blackmore's Night, the band formed by Rainbow guitarist Ritchie Blackmore (formerly of Deep Purple) and his wife Candice Night, recorded a rendition on their 1997 debut album Shadow of the Moon.

== Track listings ==
- 7-inch single, Germany
1. "Wish You Were Here" (radio edit) — 4:00
2. "Wish You Were Here" (Live at Brunkeflo Town Hall) — 4:08
- 12-inch maxi-single, Germany
1. "Wish You Were Here" (Stampede Remix) — 5:57
2. "Wish You Were Here" (radio edit) — 4:00
3. "Wish You Were Here" (Live at Brunkeflo Town Hall) — 4:08
4. "Hittin' the Hay" — 3:19
- CD single, Europe
1. "Wish You Were Here" (radio edit) — 3:56
2. "Hittin' the Hay" — 3:18
- CD maxi, Europe
1. "Wish You Were Here" (radio edit) — 3:56
2. "Wish You Were Here" (Live at Brunkeflo Town Hall) — 3:57
3. "Hittin' the Hay" — 3:18
4. "Wish You Were Here" (Stampede Remix) — 6:05

== Charts ==
=== Weekly charts ===
Chart (1995)	Peak position
Austria (Ö3 Austria Top 40)	1
Belgium (Ultratop 50 Flanders)	50
Belgium (Ultratop 50 Wallonia)	24
Denmark (IFPI)	10
Europe (Eurochart Hot 100)	5
Europe (European Hit Radio)	40
Finland (Suomen virallinen lista)	6
Germany (GfK)	1
Iceland (Íslenski Listinn Topp 40)	2
Israel (Israeli Singles Chart)	3
Netherlands (Dutch Top 40)	32
Netherlands (Single Top 100)	26
Norway (VG-lista)	1
Sweden (Sverigetopplistan)	3
Switzerland (Schweizer Hitparade)	1

=== Year-end charts ===
Chart (1995)	Position
Austria (Ö3 Austria Top 40)	1
Europe (Eurochart Hot 100)	22
Germany (Media Control)	3
Iceland (Íslenski Listinn Topp 40)	41
Latvia (Latvijas Top 50)	14
Sweden (Topplistan)	16
Switzerland (Schweizer Hitparade)	3

=== Decade-end charts ===
Chart (1990–1999)	Rank
Austria (Ö3 Austria Top 40)	11

== Certifications ==
Region	Certification	Certified units/sales
Austria (IFPI Austria)	Gold	25,000^{*}
Germany (BVMI)	Platinum	500,000^{^}
Norway (IFPI Norway)	Platinum	
Switzerland (IFPI Switzerland)	Gold	25,000^{^}
^{*} Sales figures based on certification alone.^{^} Shipments figures based on certification alone.

== Cover versions ==
- Urgent C in 1995
- Blackmore's Night on album, Shadow of the Moon (1997)
- In 2006, the song was covered by former Deutschland sucht den SuperStar contestant Anna-Maria Zimmermann on the Love Songs album.
