= Cotton Eye Joe (Rednex song) =

1994 single by Rednex

Single by Rednex

from the album Sex & Violins
- Released: 2 August 1994
- Studio: Future Crew, Idaho
- Genre: Techno; country; Eurodance; novelty
- Length: 3:14
- Label: Jive; Zomba
- Songwriters: Janne Ericsson; Örjan Öban Öberg; Pat Reiniz
- Producer: Pat Reiniz

Rednex singles chronology
"Cotton Eye Joe" (1994)	"Old Pop in an Oak" (1994)
"The Chase" (2001)	"Cotton Eye Joe 2002" (2002)	"Mama Take Me Home" (2006)

Music video
- "Cotton Eye Joe" on YouTube

"Cotton Eye Joe" is a novelty song by the Swedish Eurodance group Rednex, released in August 1994 by Jive and Zomba as the lead single from their debut studio album, Sex & Violins (1995). Based on the traditional American folk song "Cotton-Eyed Joe", it blends the group's Eurodance style with traditional American instruments like the banjo and fiddle. The song was written by Janne Ericsson, Örjan "Öban" Öberg, and Pat Reiniz, and produced by Reiniz. The vocal verses are performed by Annika Ljungberg, while the "Cotton Eye Joe" chorus is sung by Göran Danielsson, who does not appear in the music video, which was directed by Stefan Berg.

"Cotton Eye Joe" became a number-one hit in at least 11 countries and reached number 25 on the US Billboard Hot 100. In Sweden, it was the most successful single of 1994. In 2002, "Cotton Eye Joe" was remixed into a new dance version and included on Rednex's first greatest hits album, The Best of the West (2002).

== Background and composition ==
"Cotton Eye Joe" is based on the traditional country folk song "Cotton-Eyed Joe". In 1992, the Irish group The Chieftains recorded a version of the traditional song with American country singer Ricky Skaggs. It caught the attention of the Swedish producers of Rednex, who transformed it into a techno number. "Cotton Eye Joe" was made in about 4 hours. Originally, it was recorded as a instrumental track. At the time of release, it was also compared to instrumental tracks such as "Swamp Thing" and "Everybody Gonfi-Gon". Zomba marketing manager Charles Hunfeld told Music & Media, "Whereas the others are more or less instrumental 'country-house', the Rednex have made a vocal record. Admittedly, originally it wasn't. After we heard the first demo version, we had to A&R it a bit. The effect of the song in the clubs is beyond belief. [...] Within a split second it looks like everybody's got mad cow disease."

"Cotton Eye Joe" has a new verse that doesn't appear in the original traditional song and was written by producer Pat Reiniz. He had been an exchange student in the US in the 1980s. Reiniz told in an interview in 2021, "When we released "Cotton Eye Joe", we knew very little about the American hillbilly/redneck culture, other than the stereotypes. For us, the redneck image was very compatible with the feeling of the music - raw, energetic, simple, party, etc." The song begins with the chorus sung by male vocalist Göran Danielsson and nearly a minute into the track, female vocalist Annika Ljungberg delivers the first of two verses. It has a runtime of 3 minutes and 14 seconds, a tempo of 132 BPM, and a time signature of 4/4. "Cotton Eye Joe" is written in the key of A major. In the 2020 book, Move Your Body (2 The 90s): Unlimited Eurodance, writer Juha Soininen noted that the song "broke the euro mould by letting a man sing the refrain while a woman sang the middle part."

== Critical reception ==
Johnny Loftus from AllMusic named "Cotton Eye Joe" a "backwater Euro-dance novelty". Larry Flick from Billboard magazine described it as "country hoedown fiddling sewn into a raucous pop/rave dance beat", noting that the song has "cheeky rap poking stereotypical fun at Southerners". J.D. Considine from The Daily Gazette named it "the piece de resistance, a track so infernally catchy that you almost don't notice how screamingly funny it is." Jim Farber from Daily News complimented the band for managing "to crack the pop singles chart at a time when even country stars who sell millions of albums can't make hay on the pop song list." David Browne from Entertainment Weekly commented, "For sheer audaciousness, it's not surprising that the record is garnering such attention. Where else can you hear a barn-dance staple gone techno, complete with dance-diva wailing and manic banjos and fiddles?" Tom Ewing of Freaky Trigger said that "Cotton Eye Joe" works "on that basic, energetic, ass-moving level", adding that "the hollering diva interludes actually change things up a little, though that decades-old hook is solid enough to stand on its own." Dave Sholin from the Gavin Report noted that "this group from Sweden puts a techno spin on a square dance staple", stating that its "fresh, unique approach makes 'Cotton Eye Joe' so hot." A reviewer from Knoxville News Sentinel described it as "techno-hoedown". In his weekly UK chart commentary, James Masterton deemed it "a massive party smash no matter where you are".

Howard Cohen from The Miami Herald wrote that "every decade has its novelty song", adding that "it deserves credit for its gumption, at least." Pan-European magazine Music & Media said "it takes three to set a trend: the Grid's 'Swamp Thing', the Two Cowboys' 'Everybody Gonfi-Gon' and Bravado's 'Harmonica Man'. Rednex are the next modern barn dance act." A reviewer from Music Week gave it a full score of five out of five, describing it as "Europop meets country in an irritatingly catchy tune", that is "guaranteed to pack the dance floors at party time and a cast iron cert of a hit." John Kilgo from The Network Forty complimented "Cotton Eye Joe" as a "outright winner", stating that "this novelty track is not only catchy and fun, but uptempo as well." Stuart Bailie from NME wrote, "A fantastic western dance (and if you haven't thrown shapes to this at The Broken Spoke in Austin, well, you've missed out, mate) is given the full-on techno treatment, like that cowboy outfit The Grid have done already this year. Maybe another novelty turn, but fun with it." Neil Spencer from The Observer viewed it as "an initially amusing joke". James Hamilton from the Record Mirror Dance Update declared it a "happily galloping Swedish disco hoedown with square dance caller, fiddle and banjo" in his weekly dance column. Chuck Campbell from Scripps Howard News Service felt it "has the same novelty appeal" as "I'm Too Sexy", "but in addition to the aggressive dance rhythm and offbeat vocals, the Rednex song also features an impossibly high-voiced woman and manic fiddle and banjo."

== Chart performance ==
"Cotton Eye Joe" held the number-one position for 15 weeks in Norway, 13 weeks in Switzerland, 11 weeks in Denmark, 10 weeks in Germany, eight weeks in Sweden, seven weeks in Austria, and three weeks in Finland and the United Kingdom. In the UK, the single reached the top spot during its fifth week on the UK Singles Chart, on 8 January 1995. It also peaked at number one in Belgium (5 weeks) and the Netherlands (1 week), as well as on the Eurochart Hot 100, where it peaked in its 17th week on the chart, on 24 December 1994. In Ireland, it peaked at number two in January 1995.

Outside Europe, the song topped the RIANZ Singles Chart in New Zealand for six consecutive weeks. In neighbouring Australia, it peaked at number eight in April 1995. Although it was a tougher sell in the United States, where it was too haywire for most radio stations, it peaked at number 25 on the Billboard Hot 100 and number 23 on the Cash Box Top 100. In West Asia, the song reached number 13 in Israel, peaking in its second week on the chart on 22 November 1994. "Cotton Eye Joe" was awarded a gold record in Australia (35,000), the Netherlands (50,000), and the US (500,000). It also received a platinum record in Austria (50,000), New Zealand (10,000), Sweden (50,000), Switzerland (50,000), and the UK (1,200,000), as well as a double-platinum record in Germany (100,000) and Norway.

== Music video ==
The accompanying music video for "Cotton Eye Joe" was directed by Swedish director Stefan Berg. It was styled on "Smells Like Teen Spirit" by Nirvana and won the prize for the best Swedish dance video at the 1995 Swedish Dance Music Awards. The video features the band performing in a barn during a hoedown where the guests did activities such as dancing, playing and splashing in old wild west baths, and riding a mechanical bull. Several signs can be seen in the barn, with inscriptions like "Horses outside", "No bath!" and "No sex allowed". The video ends with a short fast-motion clip of a girl riding the mechanical bull. Göran Danielsson, who sings the "Cotton Eye Joe" chorus, never appears in the video. It received heavy rotation on MTV Europe and was A-listed on Germany's VIVA in November and December 1994. In the US, the video generated massive reaction on its first week on The Box. Billboard magazine wrote, "The release is supported by a videoclip that reinforces its imagery of toothless, tobacco-juice-spitting cow-folk whooping it up amid the hay bales." "Cotton Eye Joe" was later made available on Rednex's official YouTube channel in 2013.

== Impact and legacy ==
"Cotton Eye Joe" was nominated in the category for Best Swedish Dance Track 1994 at the 1995 Swedish Dance Music Awards. MTV Dance ranked it number 51 in their list of "The 100 Biggest 90's Dance Anthems of All Time" in November 2011. BuzzFeed ranked it number 97 in their list of "The 101 Greatest Dance Songs of the '90s" in 2017. Paste magazine ranked the song number 17 in "The 60 Best Dancefloor Classics" list in 2017. ThoughtCo ranked it number 92 in their list of "The Top 100 Best Party Songs of All Time" in 2018, adding, "What happens when you combine folk, techno, and bluegrass music? It goes something like this hit". Billboard magazine ranked "Cotton Eye Joe" number 49 in their list of "The 100 Greatest Jock Jams of All Time" in February 2024, writing, "A dangerously stomping Eurocountry reinvention of a 150-plus-year-old folk song, and one of the most demented crossover hits of the '90s."

The New York Yankees have often played "Cotton Eye Joe" as part of their seventh-inning stretch.

2001 BDO World Champion John Walton uses this as his walk-on music. "Cotton Eye Joe" was frequently played for a segment called "Coin Quest" in the Adult Swim television series FishCenter Live. Jimmy Fallon sang a soft rock-style version of this song on his eponymous late-night talk show as part of the Musical Genre Challenge.

In 2021, the Ontario Hockey League team, the Guelph Storm, stopped using the song during games after consultation with local groups alleging the song has racist origins.

On 12 August 2023, "Cotton Eye Joe" interrupted a tiebreaker during a Canadian Open match between Iga Świątek and Jessica Pegula. The point was replayed. The song could later be heard playing over the loudspeakers after Pegula went on to defeat Świątek in three sets.

In August 2024, fans of the Disney Channel cartoon Gravity Falls discovered that inputting the name of the character Fiddleford Hadron McGucket into a website created by series creator Alex Hirsch as a tie in for a recent book related to the series, it would redirect to the "Cotton Eye Joe" video on YouTube. Rednex themselves later congratulated fans who had discovered it and shared a video related to it.

In the 2026 BBC TV series Ann Droid, the track is repeatedly played by the robot character Linda as an example of music to improve mood.

== Track listings ==
- Original CD
1. "Cotton Eye Joe" (original single version) – 3:14
2. "Cotton Eye Joe" (Madcow Mix) – 4:46
3. "Cotton Eye Joe" (Madcow Instrumental) – 4:46
4. "Cotton Eye Joe" (Overworked Mix) – 6:20
5. "Cotton Eye Joe" (Original Instrumental) – 3:08
- 2002 CD
1. "Cotton Eye Joe 2002" – 3:33
2. "Cotton Eye Joe 2002" (Dance Nation Remix) – 7:32
3. "Cotton Eye Joe 2002" (Aquagen Remix) – 7:45
4. "Ride the Hurricane's Eye" (Winnetoons version) – 3:02
5. "Cotton Eye Joe 2002" (extended version) – 5:56

== Charts ==
=== Weekly charts ===
Chart (1994–1995)	Peak position
Australia (ARIA)	8
Austria (Ö3 Austria Top 40)	1
Belgium (Ultratop 50 Flanders)	1
Canada Top Singles (RPM)	18
Canada Dance/Urban (RPM)	1
Denmark (Tracklisten)	1
Europe (Eurochart Hot 100)	1
Europe (European Dance Radio)	3
Europe (European Hit Radio)	14
Finland (Suomen virallinen lista)	1
France (SNEP)	10
Germany (GfK)	1
Iceland (Íslenski Listinn Topp 40)	22
Ireland (IRMA)	2
Israel (Israeli Singles Chart)	13
Netherlands (Dutch Top 40)	1
Netherlands (Single Top 100)	1
New Zealand (Recorded Music NZ)	1
Norway (VG-lista)	1
Quebec (ADISQ)	9
Scotland (OCC)	1
Spain (AFYVE)	8
Sweden (Sverigetopplistan)	1
Switzerland (Schweizer Hitparade)	1
UK Singles (Official Charts)	1
UK Dance (OCC)	3
UK Airplay (Music Week)	2
UK Club Chart (Music Week)	25
UK Pop Tip Club Chart (Music Week)	14
US Billboard Hot 100	25
US Dance Club Play (Billboard)	5
US Maxi-Singles Sales (Billboard)	18
US Top 40/Mainstream (Billboard)	30
US Cash Box Top 100	23
Zimbabwe (ZIMA)	3

Chart (2002–2003)	Peak position
Australia (ARIA)	81
Austria (Ö3 Austria Top 40)	32
Germany (GfK)	83

Chart (2026)	Peak position
Germany Dance (GfK)	17

=== Year-end charts ===
Chart (1994)	Position
Austria (Ö3 Austria Top 40)	7
Belgium (Ultratop 50 Flanders)	7
Europe (Eurochart Hot 100)	21
Germany (Media Control)	4
Netherlands (Dutch Top 40)	9
Netherlands (Single Top 100)	9
Sweden (Topplistan)	1
UK Singles (OCC)	45

Chart (1995)	Position
Australia (ARIA)	34
Austria (Ö3 Austria Top 40)	10
Belgium (Ultratop 50 Wallonia)	66
Brazil (Crowley)	85
Canada Dance/Urban (RPM)	13
Europe (Eurochart Hot 100)	11
France (SNEP)	50
Germany (Media Control)	13
Latvia (Latvijas Top 50)	48
New Zealand (RIANZ)	5
Norway (VG-lista) (Winter Period)	9
Switzerland (Schweizer Hitparade)	10
UK Singles (OCC)	16
US Billboard Hot 100	93

=== Decade-end charts ===
Chart (1990–1999)	Position
Austria (Ö3 Austria Top 40)	14
Belgium (Ultratop 50 Flanders)	24
Netherlands (Dutch Top 40)	98

== Sales and certifications ==
Region	Certification	Certified units/sales
Australia (ARIA)	Gold	35,000^{^}
Austria (IFPI Austria)	Platinum	50,000^{*}
Denmark (IFPI Danmark)	Platinum	90,000^{‡}
Germany (BVMI)	2× Platinum	1,000,000^{^}
Italy (FIMI)	Gold	50,000^{‡}
Netherlands (NVPI)	Gold	50,000^{^}
New Zealand (RMNZ)	2× Platinum	60,000^{‡}
Norway (IFPI Norway)	2× Platinum	
Sweden (GLF)	Platinum	50,000^{^}
Switzerland (IFPI Switzerland)	Platinum	50,000^{^}
United Kingdom (BPI)	2× Platinum	1,200,000^{‡}
United States (RIAA)	Gold	500,000^{^}
^{*} Sales figures based on certification alone.^{^} Shipments figures based on certification alone.^{‡} Sales+streaming figures based on certification alone.

== Release history ==
Region	Date	Format(s)	Label(s)	Ref.
Germany	2 August 1994	CD	ZYX Music	
United Kingdom	5 December 1994	7-inch vinyl; 12-inch vinyl; CD; cassette	Internal Affairs; Zomba	
United States	24 February 1995	7-inch vinyl; 12-inch vinyl; CD; cassette	Battery	
Japan	21 April 1995	CD	Jive; Internal Affairs	
