= Rednex =

Swedish Eurodance group

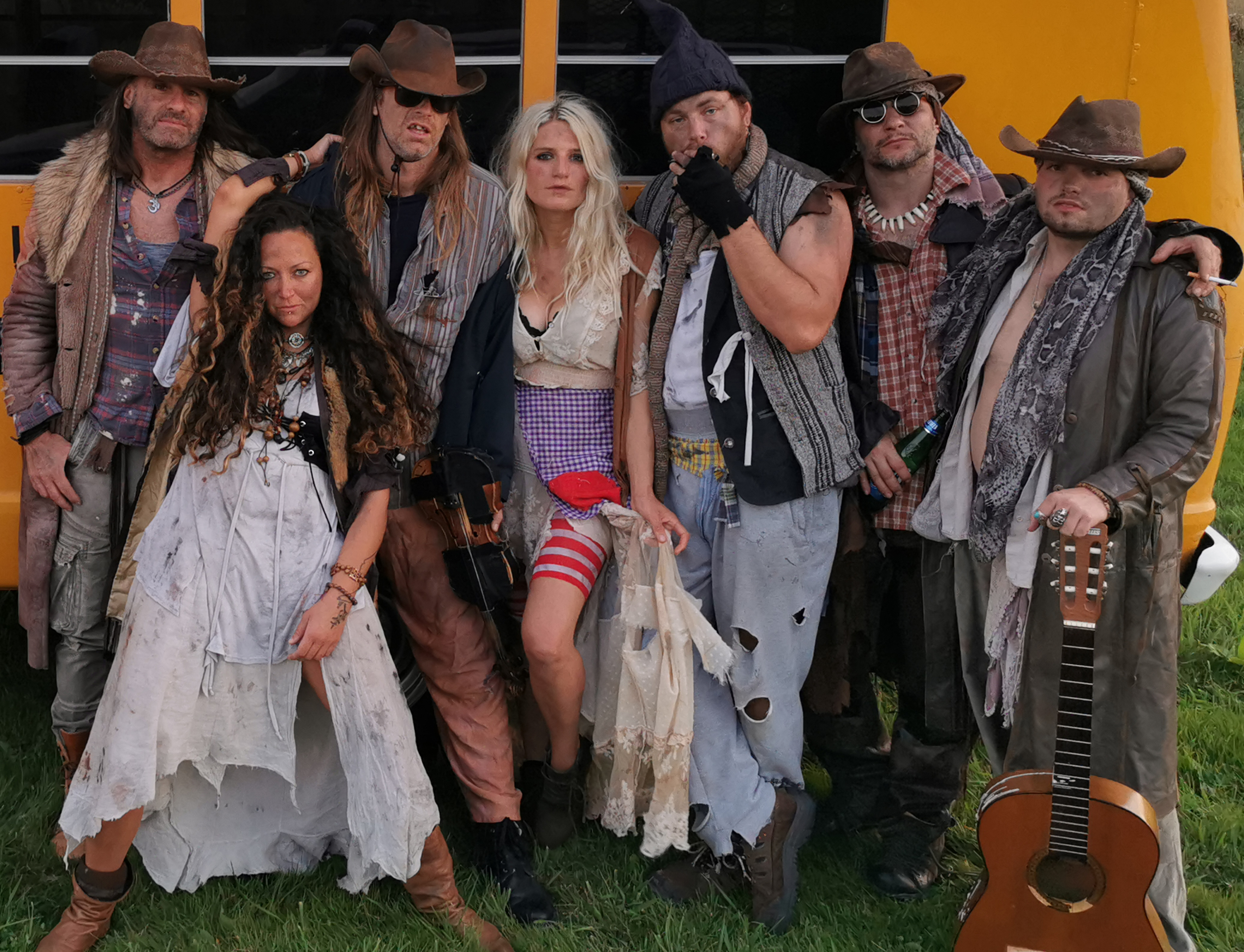
- Rednex in 2020: Cash, Jiggie McClagganahan, Spades, Pickles, Moe Lester the Limp, Boneduster Crock and Pervis the Palergator, during the video recording of "Nowhere in Idaho"

Background information
- Origin: Kiruna, Sweden
- Genres: Eurodance; country; country pop
- Years active: 1994–present
- Labels: Zomba; Jive; Battery; Rednex Ltd/Muunshine Muusic; Virgin; Internal Affairs
- Members: Ace Ratclaw (Tor Penten); Spades (Jan Blumentrath); Pervis The Palergator (Christian Nakanishi); Zoe Duskin (Nika Karch); Jiggie McClagganahan (Yana Görisch); Moe Lester the Limp; Cash (Uwe Grunert); Boneduster Crock (Björn Scheffler); Rufus Jones; Mup; Misty Mae (Cecilia Karlsson); Pickles (Siddy Bennett); Whippy (Mia Nilö); Billy Ray (Jonas Nilsson); BB Stiff (Urban Landgren); Bobby Sue (Kent Olander)
- Past members: Dakotah (Nadja Flood); Mary Joe (Annika Ljungberg); Ken Tacky (Arne Arstrand); Dagger (Anders Sandberg); Scarlet (Julie-Anne Tulley); Jens Sylsjö; Maverick (Anders Lundström); Jay Lee (Jean-Paul Engeln); Joe Cagg (Roy van der Haagen); Abby Hick (Christine van de Ven); Rattler; The Original Boneduster Crock (Jason Holler)
- Website: rednexmusic.com

Rednex are a Swedish musical group whose style is a mix of country music and eurodance, with their appearance and stage names taking inspiration from American redneck stereotypes. The band has gone through multiple lineup changes throughout its existence and none of the original members remain in the band.

The name "Rednex" was chosen as a deliberate misspelling of the word "rednecks".

The group enjoyed success throughout the 1990s and early 2000s, with the novelty songs "Cotton Eye Joe" (1994), "Old Pop in an Oak" (1994), "Wish You Were Here" (1995) and "The Spirit of the Hawk" (2000) all reaching #1 in several European countries. "Cotton Eye Joe" was the group's only U.S. hit; it reached number 25 on the Billboard charts in March 1995.

== Band history ==
=== 1994–1995: Formation and Sex & Violins ===
Rednex was the idea of Swedish producers Janne Ericsson, Örjan "Öban" Öberg, and Ranis Edenberg, Edenberg was inspired by a version of "Cotton-Eyed Joe" by Ricky Scaggs, added bass and a dance beat, and titled the remix "Cotton Eye Joe". They hired a band as a subcontractor to record the song. After a year, they played the remix for Martin Dodd. Over the first few years, Edenberg and his friends earned 40 to 50 million Swedish kronor.

Edenberg was replaced in the band by BB Stiff (Urban Landgren) after the "Cotton Eye Joe" release. The group's debut studio album titled Sex & Violins followed, spawning several more hit singles including "Old Pop in an Oak" and the ballad "Wish You Were Here". Two more tracks of the album, "Wild 'N Free" and "Rolling Home", were released and became moderate hits. A promotional one-off single, the Nicole cover version "Ein bißchen Frieden", was released and labeled as "Collo Rossi" for the release.

=== 1996–1997: Departure of Ljungberg and Riding Alone ===
In 1996, Rednex were featured on the charity single "Children", as part of the supergroup "Hand in Hand for Children". That year, Ljungberg was fired partly due to disagreements with the other band members, and pursued a solo career.

In 1997, the remaining four men released "Riding Alone", out of Sex & Violins, two years after the previous release "Rolling Home". Arstrand started a side project that same year called Explode, a progressive power metal band, and released the debut studio album Live Forever in Sweden.

=== 1998–2000: Farm Out and controversial lineup changes ===
In autumn 1998, Whippy (Mia Löfgren) became the new female vocalist. They released their first single "The Way I Mate" in 1999. Soon after that release, Arstrand left the band, reducing the quintet to a quartet. The second studio album entitled Farm Out followed in 2000 and found some success in Europe, with the most successful single from the album, the second release "The Spirit of the Hawk", peaking #1 in the German Singles Chart. The album spawned a third and final single, the ballad "Hold Me for a While", which became a moderate success. In 2000, due to the rise in popularity of Napster, co-founder Edenberg changed the group to an entertainment group rather than just a band, so not to be solely dependent on record sales. As he presented this idea to the performers during the video shoot for "Hold Me For A While" in Kenya, he was met by great scepticism. Nilsson replied: "We will not become a goddamn circus act!". The aftermath of this conflict resulted in the whole band, all four members, Löfgren, Olander, Nilsson and Landgren, being replaced for the first time.

=== 2001–2004: The Best of the West and more lineup changes ===
As of January 2001, the group consisted of the female lead singer Scarlet (Julie-Anne Tulley, formerly known as Jules Tulley from Dreamhouse) from England, alongside the three male members Dagger (Anders Sandberg) from Sweden, Joe Cagg (Roy van der Haagen) and Jay Lee (Jean-Paul Engeln) from the Netherlands. It was the first time the band were not all Swedish. In 2001, the single "The Chase", the first single out of their 2002 first compilation album The Best of the West, was released and charted in Germany and Switzerland. In 2002, the second and final single from the album, a reworked 2002 remix of "Cotton Eye Joe", was released and made the Top 30 in Austria. In 2003, the two Dutchmen van der Haagen and Engeln were replaced by Ace Ratclaw (Tor Penten) from Sweden and Boneduster Crock (Björn Scheffler) from Germany. In October 2004, Tulley resigned from the group due to exhaustion.

=== 2005–2006: Return of Ljungberg and Comeback ===
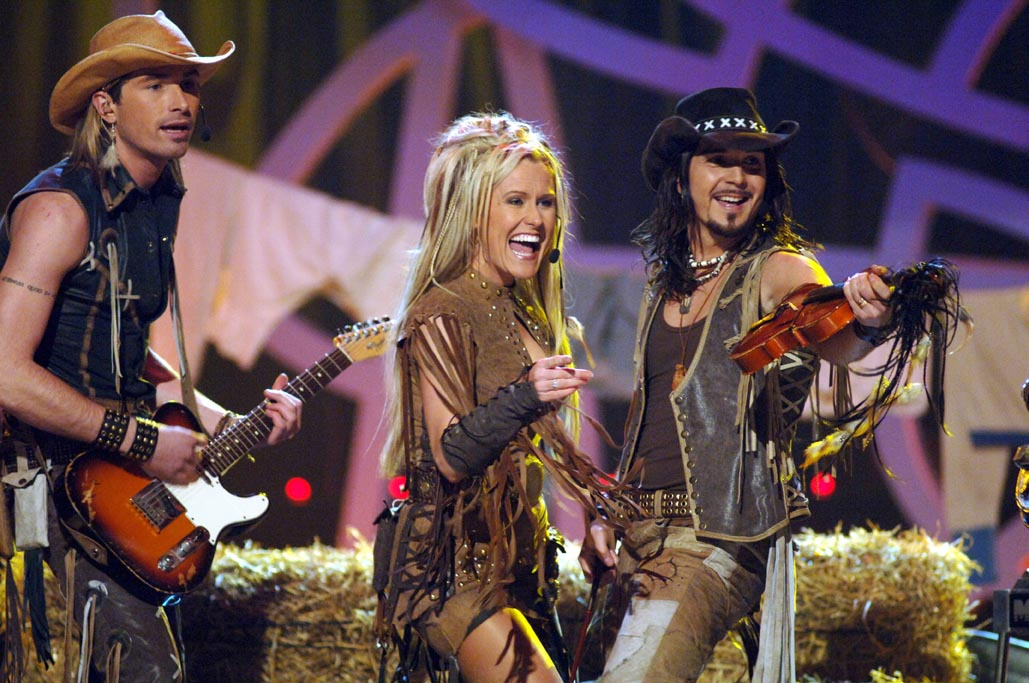
2007–2008 Rednex lineup of (left to right) Anders Lundström, Annika Ljungberg and Jens Sylsjö

In 2006, original female vocalist Ljungberg returned as Tulley's replacement in the group, she was assigned exclusive rights to license the Rednex trademark until January 1, 2009. During this period the group's focus shifted towards Scandinavia. In January 2005, Ljungberg fired Scheffler, replacing him with her husband Snake (Jens Sylsjö). In 2006, Sandberg was also fired and replaced by Maverick (Anders Lundström). Four former members, Scheffler and Sandberg, alongside Tulley and van der Haagen, and later in April 2007 joined by Penten, also a former Rednex member, began to tour under the name "Rednex Tribute".

Rednex performed at the 2005 IAAF World Championships in Athletics, in Helsinki.

In March 2006, Rednex entered the song "Mama, Take Me Home" in Semifinal 4 of the Melodifestivalen in Gothenburg. They qualified for the final via the Second Chance Round, finishing an overall sixth in the final. "Mama, Take Me Home" was released as a single in a few European countries.

The band released the second single "Fe Fi (The Old Man Died)" in November 2006, after having performed it at the Nickelodeon Kids' Choice Awards. The single peaked #4 in the Swedish Single chart.

In February 2007, the band competed to be Romania's entry in the Eurovision Song Contest 2007 but was rejected after it was determined that their song, "Well-o-wee", was not an original release.

In May 2007, the producers that owned the band's trademarks offered the band for sale for $1.5 million via eBay; however, Ljungberg disputed what the producers really owned. There were no offers.

=== 2009–2011: Second departure of Ljungberg and Singles ===
On January 1, 2009, after the end of Ljungberg's management licence, control of the Rednex brand returned to the band's founders. The remaining Rednex personnel Ljungberg, Lundström and Sylsjö were fired by the returning management following a dispute, and were replaced by members of the "Rednex Tribute" (Tulley, Sandberg, Penten and van der Haagen), all themselves former official Rednex. It was the second time the whole lineup had been replaced simultaneously.

In January 2010, Rednex released "Devil's On The Loose", in a partnership with The Pirate Bay for free and legal download worldwide. A video for the track was recorded in August 2009 in Norrbyggeby, Sweden. The song was released as the first single from the planned album Saturday Night Beaver, which was never released due low single sales. Tulley soon also left Rednex for a second time, and was replaced by Dakotah (Nadja Flood), former singer in the Swedish dansband Nova, making her the fourth official female lead singer of Rednex.

=== 2012–2014: Second departure of Tulley and Singles ===
In January 2012, Rednex dissolved the concept of a permanent band, intending instead to use a larger pool of characters from which one female and three male performers would be chosen for each performance. The pool of performers in 2012 included permanent members Flood, Sandberg, van der Haagen and Penten alongside possible replacements Scheffler, new male member Rufus Jones and new female vocalists Abby Hick and Misty Mae. At the time of the dissolution of the permanent Rednex lineup Tulley again left the band.

The second single "Racing" was released in May 2012. This was followed in November 2012 by "The End". The video for "The End" was recorded on September 2, 2012, at Garay Utca, the "ghetto of Budapest" and is a "flowumentary". In a post on Facebook, Rednex refuted the notion that "The End" is related to 2012 doomsday theories. The band in these two videos consisted of Flood, van der Haagen, Sandberg and Penten with Rufus Jones making a cameo appearance in "The End" video.

=== 2015–2017: Return of Löfgren ===
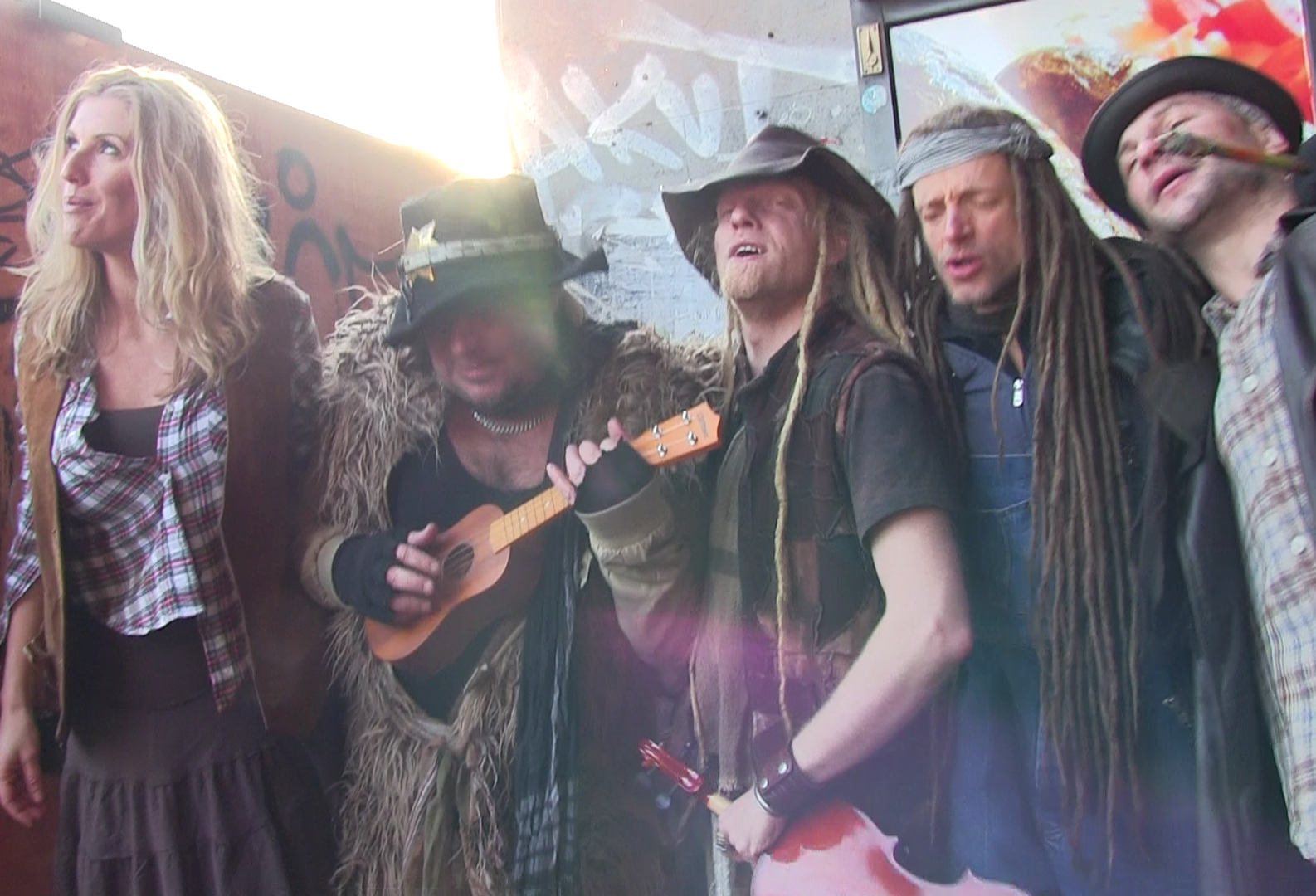
Rednex during the video recording of Innit For The Money in Berlin, New Year's Eve 2015. Whippy, Dagger, Joe Cagg, Ace Ratclaw and Boneduster Crock.

In 2015, second female singer Löfgren replaced Flood and rejoined the band. Scheffler returned to the group. On New Year's Day, Rednex recorded a music video for "Innit for the Money". The single for "Innit for the Money" followed in 2016.

In February performers Cassidy, Rattler, and Pervis the Palergator joined the band. Cassidy left Rednex 3 months later.

In August 2017, the band reproduced their song "Wish You Were Here" specially to perform at the Carl Howell Memorial Music Festival in Carson City, Nevada, to honor fallen Deputy Carl Howell, who was killed while responding to a domestic violence call.

On New Year's Eve 2017, Rednex played for the fourth time at the Brandenburger Tor in Berlin.

=== 2018–2024: Manly Man, livestream and performer turbulence ===
In early 2018, the Rednex performer pool grew to include 17 people, the highest number so far. Added to the pool were Zoe, Moe Lester the Limp and Jiggie McClagganahan.

The single and video "Manly Man" was released in July 2018. The video was recorded in Jelcz-Laskowice, Poland, at a crime scene, without prior authorization. It was criticized by several artist colleagues for being vulgar, sexist, obscene and promoting weapons and alcohol. The main characters are Dagger and Misty Mae, though all 25 Rednex performers through history are featured at some point through video flashbacks.

In August 2018, Rednex started a live streaming channel on Twitch and claimed to be the first pop band, with a worldwide hit to their name, to live stream themselves 24/7 in connection to all their shows. During the same weekend, August 10-12th, Rednex performed with three different line-ups in three different territories, totaling 13 performers, which was a new record. Zoe, Moe Lester the Limp, Spades and Pervis the Palergator did shows in Romania and Hungary, while Billy Ray, Ace Ratclaw, Boneduster Crock, Misty Mae and Jiggie McClagganahan did shows in East Germany (Berlin & Schwerin), and Abby Hick, Rattler, Cash and Joe Cagg did shows in West Germany (Bonn & Frankfurt).

In September, Abby Hick, Rattler, Boneduster Crock and Joe Cagg left Rednex. Whippy, Billy Ray and BB Stiff became reserves, reducing the pool to 10 performers. The band was still for sale for €2,000,000.

On New Year's Eve 2023, the band was sold to Original Boneduster Crock's son Hollerin’ Fox Duster Bonesteak.

In January 2024, Anders Sandberg (Dagger) died, aged 55.

In April 2024, videos featuring the band's music received 3 billion views on YouTube in 26 days, after a meme featuring "Cotton Eye Joe" went viral.

=== 2024–present: Gegagedigedagedago and Poor Boy Pour ===
In early 2024, the Rednex hit "Cotton Eye Joe" resurfaced as part of a viral remix phenomenon known as Gegagedigedagedago. The meme-driven trend on YouTube and TikTok generated massive reach and brought renewed attention to the band.

According to Swedish industry coverage, the event was one of the largest viral song trends of 2024.

Following this, Rednex released a new single, Poor Boy Pour, in mid-2025.

== Members ==
=== Permanent members ===
- 1994: Bobby Sue (Kent Olander), Billy Ray (Jonas Nilsson), Ken Tacky (Anders Arstrand), Mup (Ranis Edenberg), Mary Joe (Annika Ljungberg)
- 1994–1995: Bobby Sue, Billy Ray, Ken Tacky, Mary Joe, BB Stiff (Urban Landgren)
- 1996–1997: Bobby Sue, Billy Ray, Ken Tacky, BB Stiff
- 1998–1999: Whippy (Mia Löfgren), Bobby Sue, Billy Ray, Ken Tacky, BB Stiff
- 2000: Whippy, Bobby Sue, Billy Ray, BB Stiff
- 2001–2003: Scarlet (Julie-Anne Tulley), Dagger (Anders Sandberg), Joe Cagg (Roy van der Haagen), Jay Lee (Jean-Paul Engeln)
- 2003–2004: Scarlet, Dagger, Ace Ratclaw (Tor Penten), Boneduster Crock (Björn Scheffler)
- 2004–2005: Dagger, Ace Ratclaw, Boneduster Crock, Mary Joe
- 2005–2005: Dagger, Ace Ratclaw, Mary Joe, Snake (Jens Sylsjö)
- 2006–2006: Maverick (Anders Lundström), Ace Ratclaw, Snake, Mary Joe
- 2007–2008: Maverick, Snake, Mary Joe
- 2009–2012: Scarlet, Dagger, Ace Ratclaw, Joe Cagg

=== Pool member changes ===
- 2012-13: Dakotah (Nadja Flood), Abby Hick, Dagger, Ace Ratclaw, Joe Cagg, Rufus Jones, Mup
- 2014: Misty Mae joins.
- 2015: Whippy (Mia Löfgren), Boneduster Crock, Spades, Billy Ray, BB Stiff join. Dakotah leaves.
- 2017: Pervis the Palergator, Cash, Rattler and Cassidy join. Cassidy leaves. Dagger becomes reserve.
- 2018: Zoe, Jiggie McClagganahan, Moe Lester the Limp join. Whippy, Abby Hick, Boneduster Crock, Joe Cagg, Rattler leave. Billy Ray, BB Stiff become reserves.
- 2020: Pickles joins.
- 2024: Rufus Jones and Mup are unlikely to be found/tamed for any performances in the near future.

=== Other members ===
- Göran Danielsson

== Other brand ventures ==
=== Spin-offs and franchises ===
In January 2012, Rednex announced that they had dissolved the concept of a permanent band, intending instead to use a larger pool of characters from which one female and three male performers would be chosen for each performance.

In November 2012, Rednex began a franchise operation in Australia & New Zealand. Four new performers from Auckland and Wellington were recruited to form a second Rednex with a non exclusive license to perform in Australasia. Performers in the NZ/Australian lineup include: Rayanna Randy Payne (Theresa Murphy), Rawtooth Rick (Anthony Sibbald) and Slimboy (Pascal Roggen). A press release accompanying the franchise launch stated: "it's the first time an internationally known pop band has cloned itself".

- 2003: Rednex Revival Band (Ljungbergs band in 2003, when she wasn't allowed to perform under the Rednex trademark before she rejoined Rednex)
- 2005: Rednex Tribute (Tulley, Sandberg, van der Haagen, Penten, Scheffler, all former Rednex members, when they weren't allowed to perform under the Rednex trademark)
- 2009: Cotton Eye Joe Show (Band name, when the Rednex lineup Ljungberg, Lundström and Sylsjö lost the rights to perform under the Rednex trademark)
- 2012: Rednex NZ (An entire separate created Rednex group to perform in Australia and New Zealand consisting of Murphy, Sibbald and Roggen)

=== Use in media ===
"Cotton Eye Joe" is featured in the films The Negotiator, Space Truckers, Hood of Horror, Speak No Evil, Studentfesten, Les 11 Commandments, C'est la vie! and Milk Punch, in the TV series Malcolm in the Middle, My Name Is Earl, Peep Show, New Girl (s02e25), The Morgana Show, Lukas, Beavis and Butt-head, The Ranch and a season 13 episode of Family Guy, and in television advertisements by Telia and Telefonica. "Hittin' The Hay" and "Wild 'N Free" are featured in the animated film Barnyard. "Ride The Hurricane's Eye" was title track for German TV-series WinneToons. "Spirit of the Hawk" was title track for the German version of Fort Boyard in 2000.

=== Games ===
The Inbred With Rednex extended play features the interactive multimedia part "Inbred With Rednex" as the first track of the disc, which is a point and click adventure game starring Rednex, playable only for Windows & Mac. The whole release is housed in an 18x23cm game box. "Cotton Eye Joe" has been featured in the video games Dancing Stage EuroMIX 2, Just Dance for the Nintendo Wii and Carnival Games. PlayStation's SingStar features the songs "Cotton Eye Joe" and "Old Pop in an Oak".

== Discography ==
- Sex & Violins (1995)
- Farm Out (2000)
- The Best of the West (2009)
