= 56th Guldbagge Awards =

Annual Swedish film awards ceremony

- Date: 25 January 2021
- Site: Annexet, Stockholm
- Hosted by: David Sundin; Amie Bramme Sey

Highlights
- Best Picture: Run Uje Run
- Most nominations: Charter (7)

Television coverage
- Network: SVT
- Duration: 2 hours

The 56th Guldbagge Awards ceremony, presented by the Swedish Film Institute, honoring the best Swedish films of 2020 and took place on 25 January 2021 at Annexet in Stockholm. The ceremony was televised by SVT, and was hosted by comedian David Sundin and television host Amie Bramme Sey. The nominees were presented on 17 December 2020.

As a result of the COVID-19 pandemic, the Guldbagge Awards has changed its rules for this years ceremony. Now it doesn't matter if the films had a theatrical release or if it was dropped on a streaming service. However, the film must have been reviewed by at least five different sources out of fifteen possible, and it must be at least an hour long.

== Winners and nominees ==
The nominees for the 56th Guldbagge Awards were announced on 17 December 2020 in Stockholm, by the Swedish Film Institute.

=== Awards ===
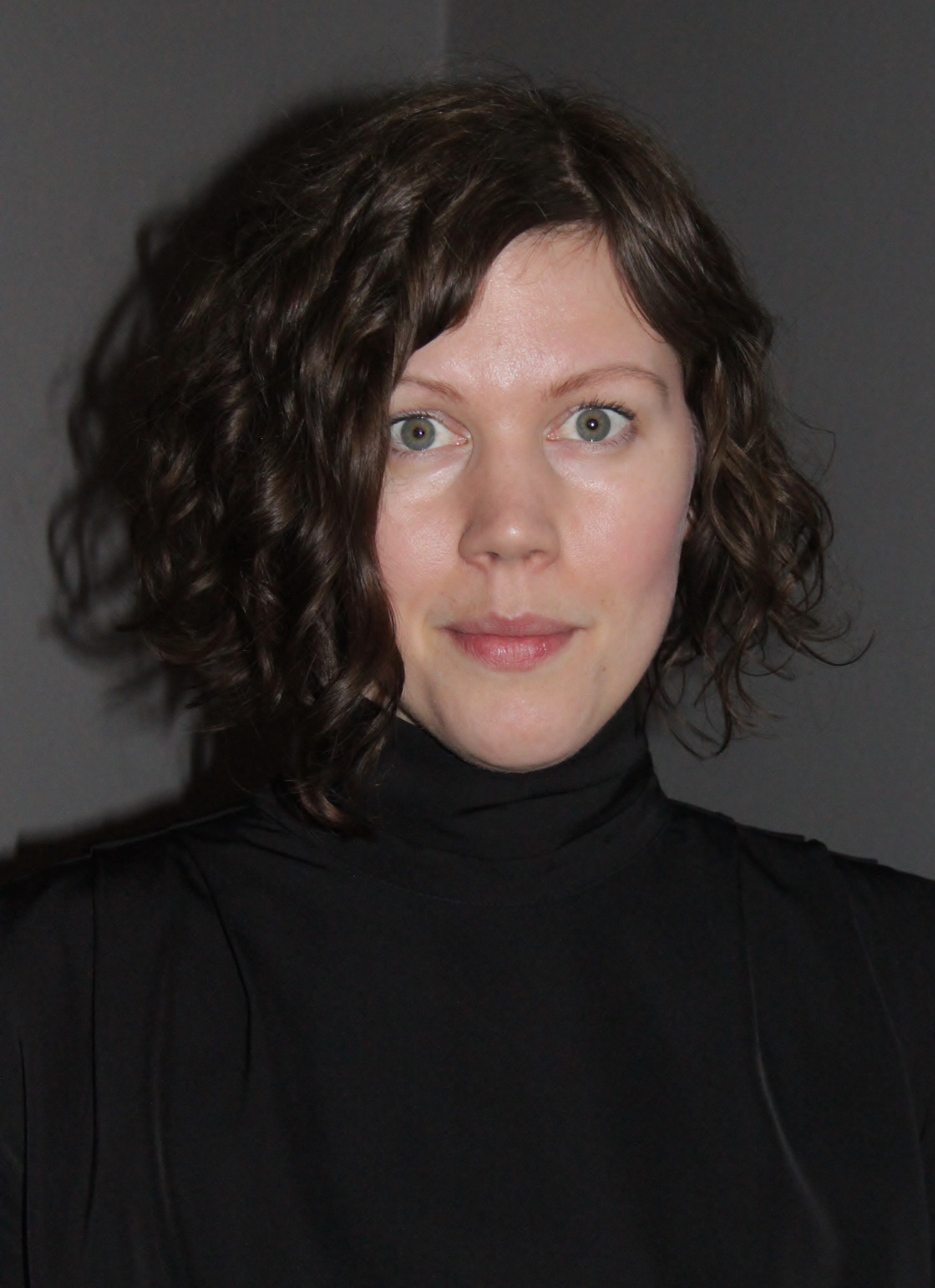
Amanda Kernell, Best Director winner

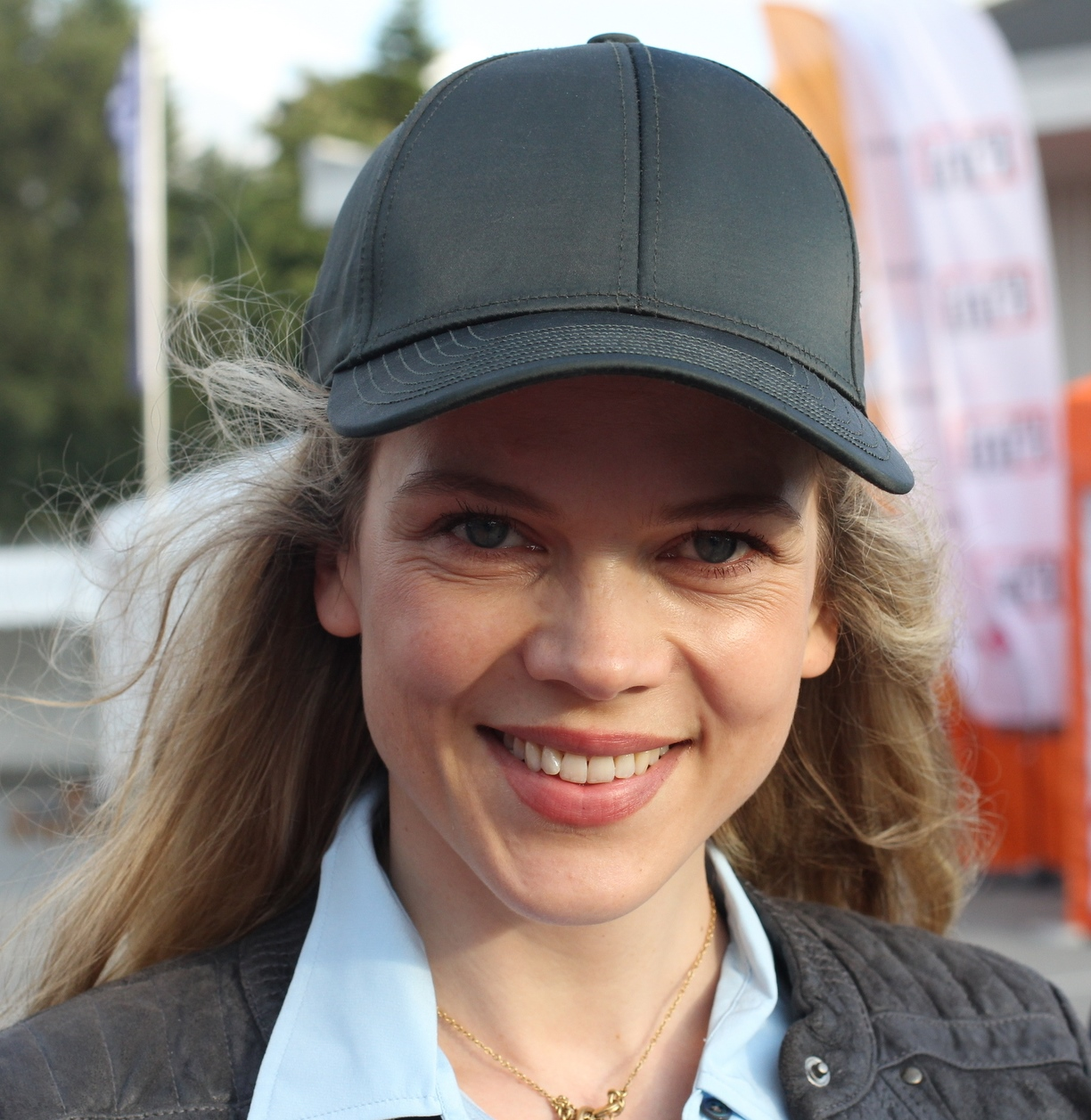
Ane Dahl Torp, Best Actress winner

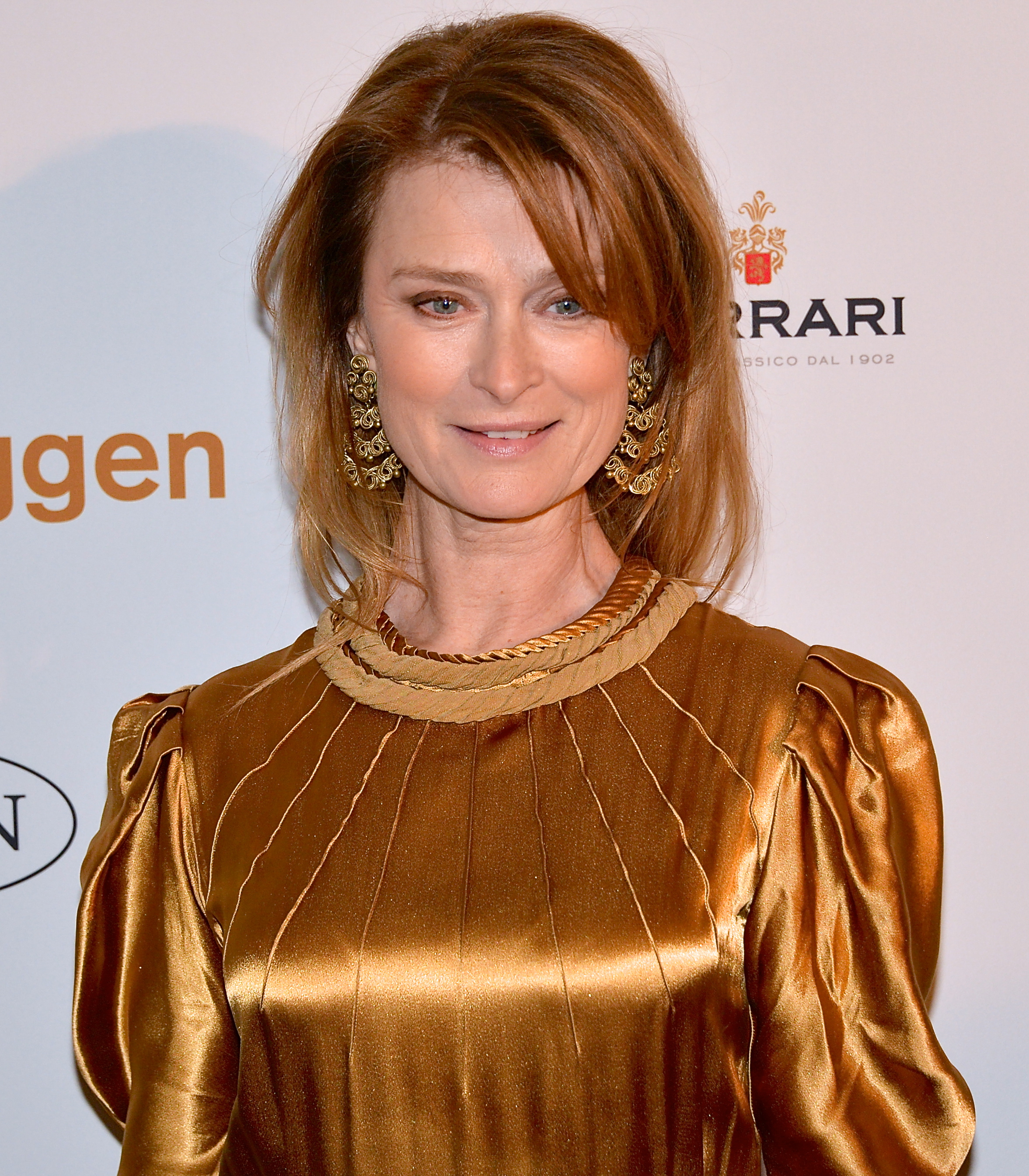
Lena Endre, Best Supporting Actress winner

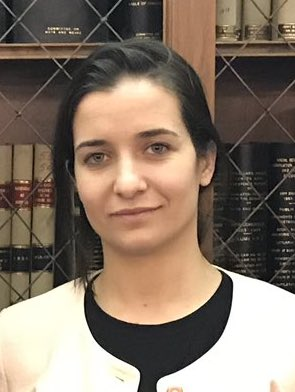
Waad Al-Kateab, Best Foreign Film winner

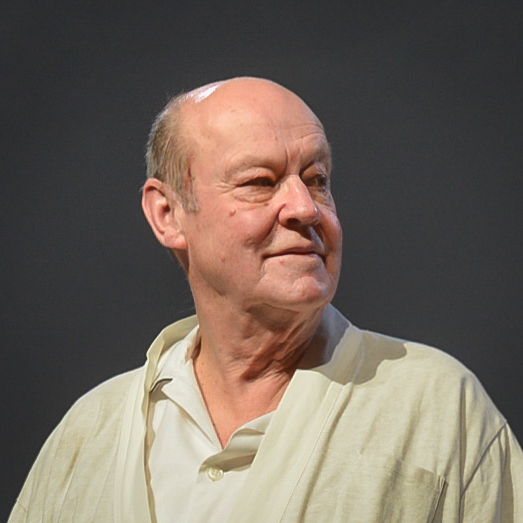
Sten Ljunggren, Honorary Award winner

Winners are listed first and highlighted in boldface.

**Best Film**: **Run Uje Run – Anna-Klara Carlsten and Tomas Michaelsson**; Charter – Lars G, Lindström and Eva Åkergren; Greta – Cecilia Nessen and Fredrik Heinig; Orca – Sofie Palage; Scheme Birds – Mario Adamson and Ruth Reid	**Best Director**: **Amanda Kernell – Charter**; Maria Bäck – Psychosis in Stockholm; Nathan Grossman – Greta; Henrik Schyffert – Run Uje Run
**Best Actress in a leading role**: **Ane Dahl Torp – Charter as Alice**; Irma von Platen – Inland as X; Josefin Neldén – Psychosis in Stockholm as The Mother; Josefine Stofkoper – Psychosis in Stockholm as The Daughter	**Best Actor in a leading role**: **Uje Brandelius – Run Uje Run as Uje Brandelius**; Adel Darwish – Ghabe as Monir; Rolf Lassgård – My Father Marianne as Lasse / Marianne; Johan Rheborg – Orca as Claes
**Best Actress in a supporting role**: **Lena Endre – My Father Marianne as Eva**; Marie Göranzon – Se upp för Jönssonligan as Margit Vanheden; Eva Melander – Inland as Lena; Marianne Mörck – Nelly Rapp – Monster Agent as Lena-Sleva	**Best Actor in a supporting role**: **Ahmad Fadel – Ghabe as Farid**; Sverrir Gudnason – Charter as Mattias; Erik Johansson – Orca as John; Ville Virtanen – The Longest Day
**Best Screenplay**: **Run Uje Run – Uje Brandelius**; Orca – Josephine Bornebusch and Gunnar A.K. Järvstad; Psychosis in Stockholm – Maria Bäck; Charter – Amanda Kernell	**Best Cinematography**: **Charter – Sophia Olsson**; Meanwhile on Earth – Mathias Døcker and Jonathan Elsborg; Run Uje Run – Frida Wendel
**Best Editing**: **Breaking Surface – Fredrik Morheden**; Run Uje Run – Adi Omanovic; Orca – Sarah Patient Nicastro	**Best Costume Design**: **Nelly Rapp – Monster Agent – Kicki Ilander**; The Other Side – Daniela Krestelica; Se upp för Jönssonligan – Cilla Rörby
**Best Sound Editing**: **The Other Side – Fredrik Lantz**; The Average Color of the Universe – Jens Johansson; Se upp för Jönssonligan – Fredrik Jonsäter	**Best Makeup and Hair**: **Nelly Rapp – Monster Agent – Hanna Holm Löfgren, Eva von Bahr and Love Larson**; Se upp för Jönssonligan – Sara Klänge; The Other Side – Daniela Krestelica, Eva von Bahr and Love Larson
**Best Original Score**: **Only the Devil Lives Without Hope – Ola Kvernberg**; Psychosis in Stockholm – Lars Greve; Nelly Rapp – Monster Agent – Uno Helmersson	**Best Art Direction**: **Se upp för Jönssonligan – Linda Janson and Charlotte Alfredson**; Charter – Sabine Hviid; Nelly Rapp – Monster Agent – Christian Olander
**Best Visual Effects**: **Breaking Surface – Jelmen Palsterman and Tony Kock**; Se upp för Jönssonligan – Chimney VFX; The Other Side – Oskar Mellander, Petter Bergmar, Håkan Ossiann, Anders Nyman and Per Nyman	**Best Documentary Feature**: **Greta – Nathan Grossman**; Idomeni – David Aronowitsch; Scheme Birds – Ellen Fiske and Ellinor Hallin
**Best Shortfilm**: **A Legacy of Horses – Annika Karlsson and Jessica Karlsson**; Du gamla, du fria – Dawid Ullgren; Index – Nicolas Kolovos	**Best Foreign Film**: **For Sama – Waad Al-Kateab and Edward Watts**; Babyteeth – Shannon Murphy; Mank – David Fincher
**Honorary Award**: **Sten Ljunggren, actor**	**Gullspiran**: **Jon Nohrstedt**
**Audience Award** Not awarded this year due to the COVID-19 pandemic.

=== Films with multiple nominations and awards ===
Films that received multiple nominations
Nominations	Film
7	Charter
6	Se upp för Jönssonligan
6	Run Uje Run
5	Nelly Rapp – Monster Agent
5	Orca
5	Psychosis in Stockholm
4	The Other Side
3	Greta

== See also ==
- 93rd Academy Awards
- 78th Golden Globe Awards
- 74th British Academy Film Awards
- 27th Screen Actors Guild Awards
- 26th Critics' Choice Awards
- 25th Satellite Awards
- 41st Golden Raspberry Awards
