= Guldbagge Award for Best Makeup and Hair =

Swedish film award for Best Makeup and Hair

- Country: Sweden
- Presented by: Swedish Film Institute
- First award: 2011 (for makeup and Hair released during the 2011 film season)
- Currently held by: Petra Cabbe, Solsidan (2017)
- Website: guldbaggen.se

The Guldbagge for Best Makeup and Hair is a Swedish film award presented annually by the Swedish Film Institute (SFI) as part of the Guldbagge Awards (Swedish: "Guldbaggen") to make-up artists working in the Swedish motion picture industry.

== Winners and nominees ==
Each Guldbagge Awards ceremony is listed chronologically below along with the winner of the Guldbagge Award for Best Makeup and Hair and the film associated with the award. In the columns under the winner of each award are the other nominees for best makeup and hairstyling.

=== 2010s ===
Year	Film	Make-up artist(s)	Ref.
2011 (47th)	Beyond the Border‡	Anna-Lena Melin	
2011 (47th)	Kronjuvelerna	Sara Klänge	
2011 (47th)	Simon and the Oaks	Linda Boije af Gennäs	
2012 (48th)	Easy Money II: Hard to Kill‡	Jenny Fred	
2012 (48th)	Call Girl	Eros Codinas	
2012 (48th)	The Last Sentence	Maria Strid Zackrisson	
2013 (49th)	We Are the Best!‡	Lisa Mustafa	
2013 (49th)	The Hundred-Year-Old Man Who Climbed Out of the Window and Disappeared	Eva von Bahr and Love Larson	
2013 (49th)	Waltz for Monica	Eva von Bahr	
2014 (50th)	Gentlemen‡	Anna Carin Lock and Anja Dahl	
2014 (50th)	A Pigeon Sat on a Branch Reflecting on Existence	Linda Sandberg	
2014 (50th)	Tjuvarnas jul – Trollkarlens dotter	Susanna Rafstedt	
2015 (51st)	A Man Called Ove‡	Eva von Bahr and Love Larson	
2015 (51st)	The Circle	Jenny Fred	
2015 (51st)	White People	Jenny Fred	
2016 (52nd)	The Giant‡	Eva von Bahr, Love Larson and Pia Aleborg	
2016 (52nd)	Flykten till framtiden	Anna-Carin Lock	
2016 (52nd)	The 101-Year Old Man Who Skipped Out on the Bill and Disappeared	Eva von Bahr and Love Larson	
2017 (53rd)	Solsidan‡	Petra Cabbe	
2017 (53rd)	All Inclusive	Sara Klänge	
2017 (53rd)	The Nile Hilton Incident	Dorothea Wiedermann	
2018 (54th)	Border‡	Göran Lundström and Erica Spetzig	
2018 (54th)	Euphoria	Morna Ferguson and Orla Carroll	
2018 (54th)	The Cake General	Eva von Bahr and Love Larson	
2019 (55th)	The Perfect Patient‡	Anna-Carin Lock	
2019 (55th)	En del av mitt hjärta	Jenny Fred	
2019 (55th)	Swoon	Madeleine Gaterud and Therese Sandersson	

=== 2020s ===
Year	Film	Make-up artist(s)	Ref.
2020 (56th)	Nelly Rapp – Monster Agent‡	Hanna Holm Löfgren, Eva von Bahr and Love Larson	
2020 (56th)	Se upp för Jönssonligan	Sara Klänge	
2020 (56th)	The Other Side	Daniela Krestelica, Eva von Bahr and Love Larson	
2021 (57th)	Pleasure‡	Erica Spetzig	
2021 (57th)	A Christmas Tale	Eros Codinas and Love Larson	
2021 (57th)	Red Dot	Therese Sandersson	
2022 (58th)	Triangle of Sadness‡	Stefanie Gredig	
2022 (58th)	Burn All My Letters	Eros Codinas and Love Larson	
2022 (58th)	Eglė Mikalauskaitė-Gricienė	Hilma	

== See also ==
- Guldbagge Awards
- Academy Award for Best Makeup and Hairstyling
- BAFTA Award for Best Makeup and Hair
- Critics' Choice Movie Award for Best Makeup
- Saturn Award for Best Make-up
