= Guldbagge Award for Best Costume Design =

Swedish film award

- Country: Sweden
- Presented by: Swedish Film Institute
- First award: 2011 (for costume design released during the 2011 film season)
- Currently held by: Louize Nissen, The Nile Hilton Incident (2017)
- Website: guldbaggen.se

The Guldbagge for Best Costume Design is a Swedish film award presented annually by the Swedish Film Institute (SFI) as part of the Guldbagge Awards (Swedish: "Guldbaggen") to costume designers working in the Swedish motion picture industry.

== Winners and nominees ==
Each Guldbagge Awards ceremony is listed chronologically below along with the winner of the Guldbagge Award for Best Costume Design and the film associated with the award. In the columns under the winner of each award are the other nominees for best costume design.

=== 2010s ===
Year	Film	Costume Designer(s)	Ref.
2011 (47th)	Kronjuvelerna‡	Moa Li Lemhagen Schalin	
2011 (47th)	Play	Pia Aleborg	
2011 (47th)	Simon and the Oaks	Katja Watkins	
2012 (48th)	Call Girl‡	Cilla Rörby	
2012 (48th)	The Last Sentence	Katja Watkins	
2012 (48th)	Mammas pojkar	Jaana Fomin	
2013 (49th)	Waltz for Monica‡	Kicki Ilander	
2013 (49th)	We Are the Best!	Moa Li Lemhagen Schalin	
2013 (49th)	Shed No Tears	Ulrika Sjölin	
2014 (50th)	Gentlemen‡	Cilla Rörby	
2014 (50th)	A Pigeon Sat on a Branch Reflecting on Existence	Julia Tegström	
2014 (50th)	Tjuvarnas jul – Trollkarlens dotter	Kicki Ilander	
2015 (51st)	Drifters‡	Mia Andersson	
2015 (51st)	Holy Mess	Camilla Thulin	
2015 (51st)	Kim	Stella J Hox	
2016 (52nd)	A Serious Game‡	Kicki Ilander	
2016 (52nd)	Flykten till framtiden	Jaana Fomin	
2016 (52nd)	Upp i det blå	Moa Li Lemhagen Schalin	
2017 (53rd)	The Nile Hilton Incident‡	Louize Nissen	
2017 (53rd)	Borg McEnroe	Kicki Ilander	
2017 (53rd)	Para knas	Sharareh Hosseini; David Markfant	
2018 (54th)	The Cake General‡	Ingrid Sjögren	
2018 (54th)	Euphoria	Denise Östholm	
2018 (54th)	Becoming Astrid	Cilla Rörby	
2019 (55th)	Swoon‡	Margrét Einarsdóttir	
2019 (55th)	438 dagar	Clinton Booyse	
2019 (55th)	En del av mitt hjärta	Anna Hagert; Anna Karlsson	

=== 2020s ===
Year	Film	Costume Designer(s)	Ref.
2020 (56th)	Nelly Rapp – Monster Agent‡	Kicki Ilander	
2020 (56th)	The Other Side	Daniela Krestelica	
2020 (56th)	Se upp för Jönssonligan	Cilla Rörby	

== See also ==
- Academy Award for Best Costume Design
- BAFTA Award for Best Costume Design
- Critics' Choice Movie Award for Best Costume Design
