= Guldbagge Award for Best Art Direction =

Swedish film award

- Country: Sweden
- Presented by: Swedish Film Institute
- First award: 2011 (for art direction in films released during the 2011 film season)
- Currently held by: Petra Kågerman, Egghead Republic (2026)
- Website: guldbaggen.se

The Guldbagge for Best Art Direction is a Swedish film award presented annually by the Swedish Film Institute (SFI) as part of the Guldbagge Awards (Swedish: "Guldbaggen") to art directors working in the Swedish motion picture industry.

== Winners and nominees ==
Each Guldbagge Awards ceremony is listed chronologically below along with the winner of the Guldbagge Award for Best Art Direction and the film associated with the award. In the columns under the winner of each award are the other nominees for best art direction.

=== 2010s ===
Year	Film	Art director(s)	Ref.
2011 (47th)	Kronjuvelerna‡	Roger Rosenberg	
2011 (47th)	Simon and the Oaks	Anders Engelbrecht, Lena Selander and Folke Strömbäck	
2011 (47th)	The Stig-Helmer Story	Cian Bornebusch	
2012 (48th)	Call Girl‡	Lina Nordqvist	
2012 (48th)	Bitchkram	Sandra Lindgren	
2012 (48th)	The Last Sentence	Peter Bävman and Pernilla Olsson	
2013 (49th)	We Are the Best!‡	Paola Holmér and Linda Janson	
2013 (49th)	Shed No Tears	Wilda Wiholm	
2013 (49th)	Waltz for Monica	Josefin Åsberg	
2014 (50th)	A Pigeon Sat on a Branch Reflecting on Existence‡	Ulf Jonsson, Nicklas Nilsson, Sandra Parment, Isabel Sjöstrand and Julia Tegström	
2014 (50th)	Gentlemen	Linda Janson	
2014 (50th)	Tjuvarnas jul – Trollkarlens dotter	Pelle Magnestam	
2015 (51st)	Drifters‡	Kajsa Severin	
2015 (51st)	There Should Be Rules	Ulrika Fredriksson	
2015 (51st)	Holy Mess	Matilda Afzelius	
2016 (52nd)	Flykten till framtiden‡	Liv Ask and Bengt Fröderberg	
2016 (52nd)	A Serious Game	Anna Asp	
2016 (52nd)	The 101-Year-Old Man Who Skipped Out on the Bill and Disappeared	Mikael Varhelyi	
2017 (53rd)	The Nile Hilton Incident‡	Roger Rosenberg	
2017 (53rd)	Borg McEnroe	Lina Nordqvist	
2017 (53rd)	The Square	Josefin Åsberg	
2018 (54th)	Ted: För kärlekens skull‡	Ulrika von Vegesack	
2018 (54th)	Balkan Noir	Emma Sofia Wahlberg	
2018 (54th)	Becoming Astrid	Linda Janson	
2019 (55th)	About Endlessness‡	Anders Hellström, Frida Ekstrand Elmström and Nicklas Nilsson	
2019 (55th)	And Then We Danced	Teo Baramidze	
2019 (55th)	Swoon	Pater Sparrow	

=== 2020s ===
Year	Film	Art director(s)	Ref.
2020 (56th)	Se upp för Jönssonligan‡	Linda Janson and Charlotte Alfredson	
2020 (56th)	Charter	Sabine Hviid	
2020 (56th)	Nelly Rapp – Monster Agent	Christian Olander	

== See also ==
- Academy Award for Best Production Design
- BAFTA Award for Best Production Design
- Critics' Choice Movie Award for Best Art Direction
