= 54th Guldbagge Awards =

Swedish awards ceremony

- Date: 28 January 2019
- Site: Cirkus, Stockholm
- Hosted by: Emma Molin

Highlights
- Best Picture: Border
- Most nominations: Border (9)

Television coverage
- Network: SVT
- Duration: 2 hours

The 54th Guldbagge Awards ceremony, presented by the Swedish Film Institute, honoring the best Swedish films of 2018 and took place on 28 January 2019 at Cirkus in Stockholm. The ceremony was televised by SVT, and comedian Emma Molin hosted the ceremony for the first time. The nominees were presented on 3 January 2019.

== Winners and nominees ==
The nominees for the 54th Guldbagge Awards were announced on 3 January 2019 in Stockholm, by the Swedish Film Institute.

=== Awards ===
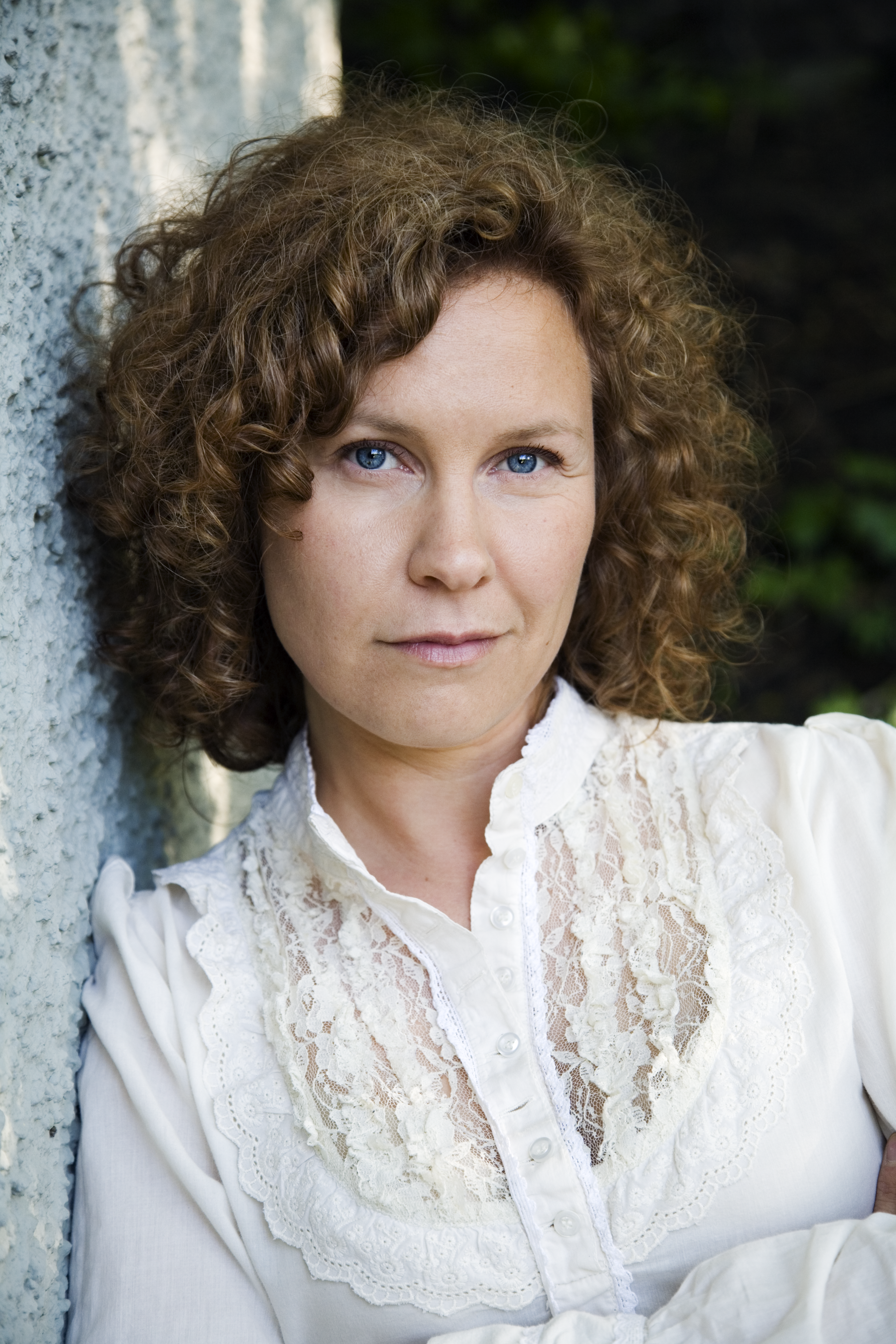
Eva Melander, Best Actress winner

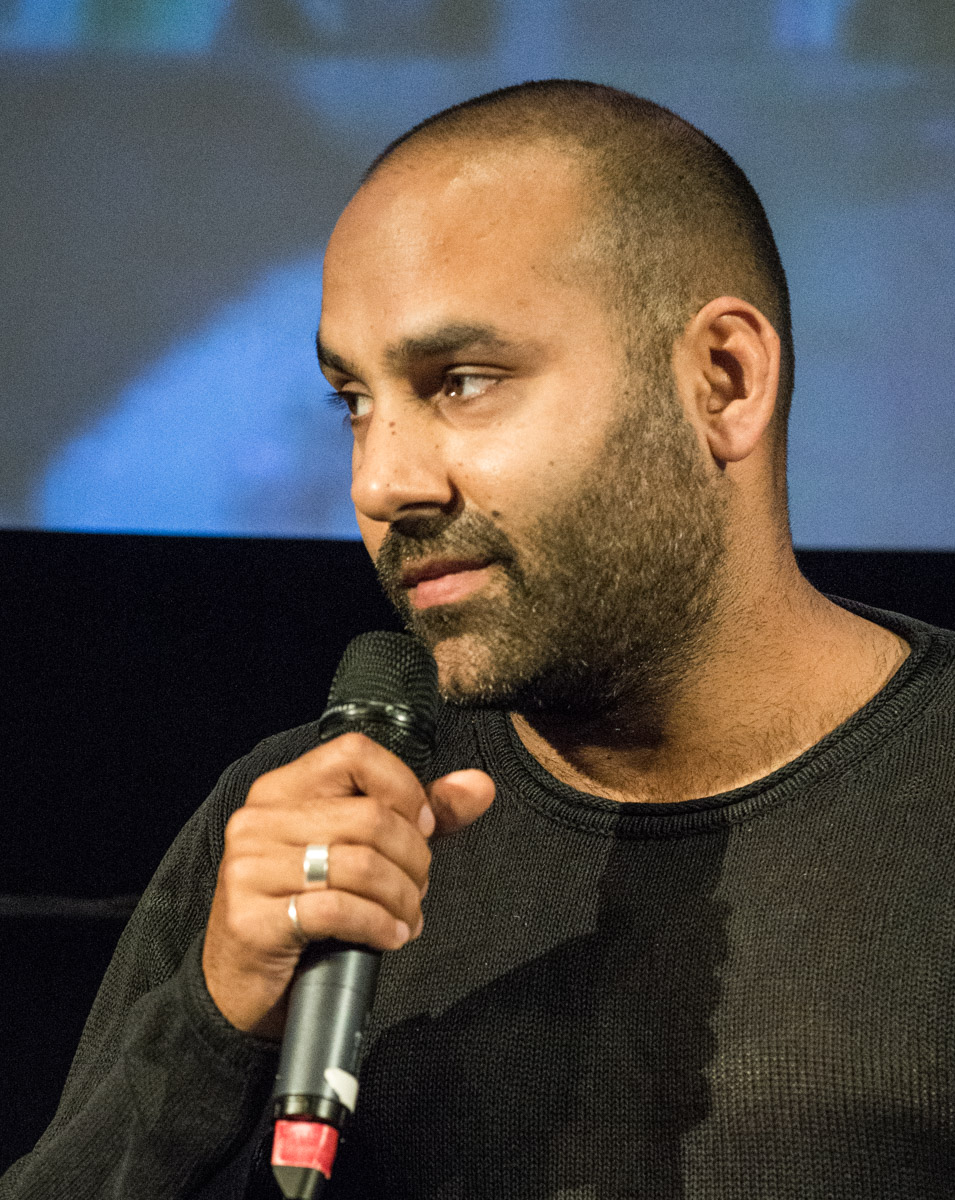
Peter Grönlund, Best Screenplay winner

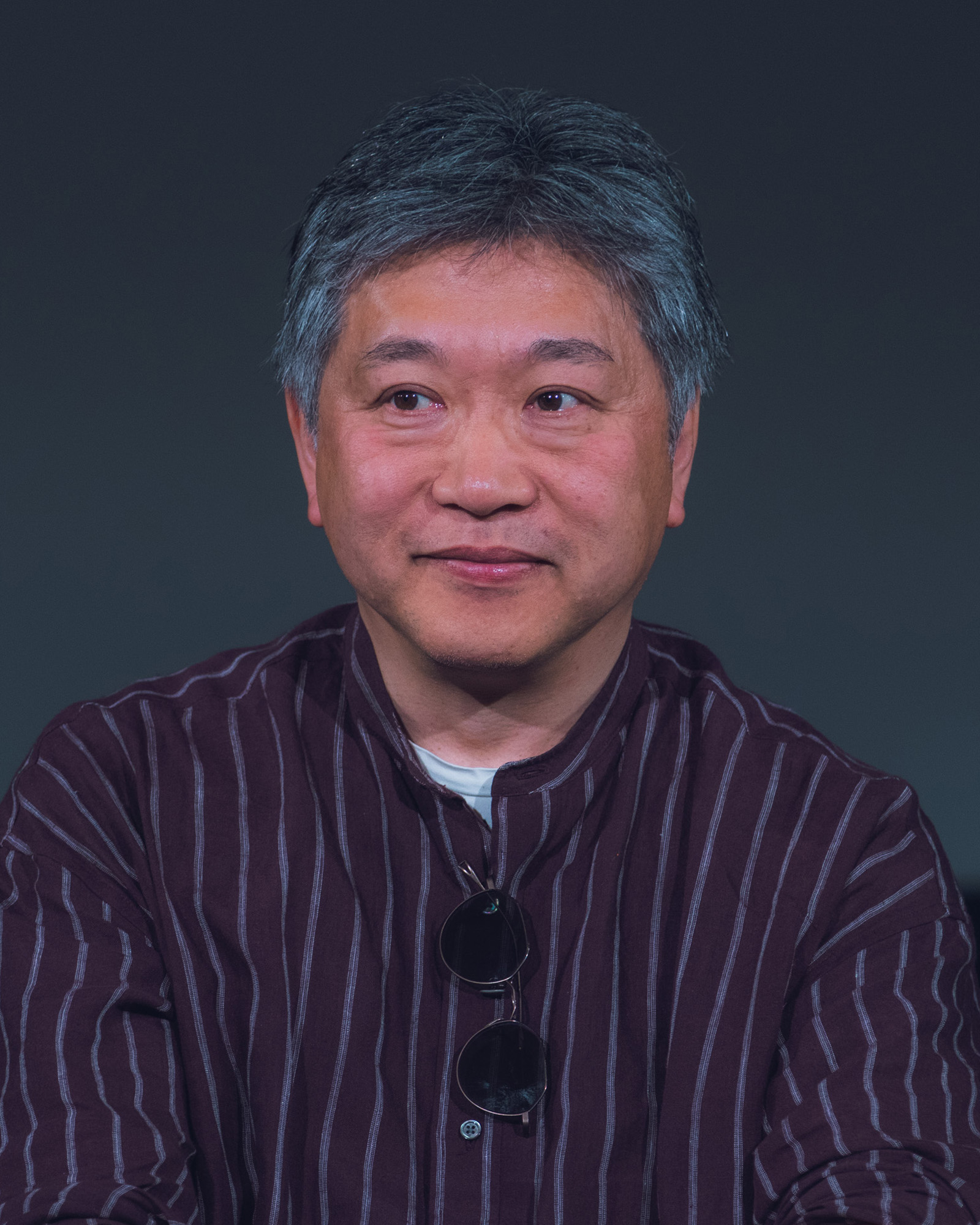
Hirokazu Kore-eda, Best Foreign Film winner

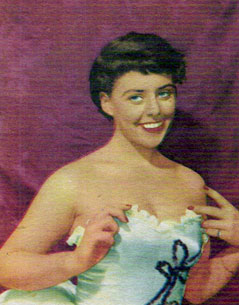
Yvonne Lombard, Honorary Award winner

Winners are listed first and highlighted in boldface.

**Best Film**: **Border – Nina Bisgaard, Piodor Gustafsson and Petra Jönsson**; The Deminer – Antonio Russo Merenda and Hogir Hirori; Den blomstertid nu kommer – Crazy Pictures; Goliath – Mattias Nohrborg and Frida Bargo; Becoming Astrid – Lars G Lindström, Maria Dahlin and Anna Anthony	**Best Director**: **Carl Javér – Reconstructing Utøya**; Ali Abbasi – Border; Måns Månsson and Axel Petersén – The Real Estate; Gabriela Pichler – Amateurs
**Best Actress in a leading role**: **Eva Melander – Border as Tina**; Zahraa Aldoujaili – Amateurs as Aida; Alba August – Becoming Astrid as Astrid Lindgren; Leonore Ekstrand – The Real Estate as Nojet	**Best Actor in a leading role**: **Joakim Sällquist – Goliath as Roland**; Fredrik Dahl – Amateurs as Musse; Sebastian Ljungblad – Goliath as Kimmie; Mikael Persbrandt – The Cake General as Hasse P
**Best Supporting Actress**: **Lena Nilsson – Videoman as Simone Karlsson**; Sissela Benn – Sune vs Sune as Karin; Maria Bonnevie – Becoming Astrid as Hanna; Trine Dyrholm – X & Y	**Best Supporting Actor**: **Eero Milonoff – Border as Vore**; Jens Albinus – X & Y; Fredrik Hallgren – Sune vs Sune as Rudolf; Henrik Rafaelsen – Becoming Astrid as Blomberg
**Best Screenplay**: **Goliath – Peter Grönlund**; Amateurs – Gabriela Pichler and Jonas Hassen Khemiri; Border – Ali Abbasi, Isabella Eklöf and John Ajvide Lindqvist; Garden Lane – Gunnar A.K. Järvstad	**Best Cinematography**: **Garden Lane – Kristoffer Jönsson**; In i dimman – Ellinor Hallin; Jimmie – Måns Månsson
**Best Editing**: **Goliath – Dino Jonsäter**; The Raft – Alexandra Strauss and Dominika Daubenbüchel; Border – Olivia Neergaard-Holm and Anders Skov	**Best Costume Design**: **The Cake General – Ingrid Sjögren**; Euphoria – Denise Östholm; Becoming Astrid – Cilla Rörby
**Best Sound Editing**: **Border – Christian Holm**; Den blomstertid nu kommer – Crazy Pictures; Jimmie – Jonas Jansson	**Best Makeup and Hair**: **Border – Göran Lundström, Pamela Goldammer and Erica Spetzig**; Euphoria – Morna Ferguson and Orla Carroll; The Cake General – Eva von Bahr and Love Larson
**Best Original Score**: **Goliath – Johan Testad**; Halvdan Viking – Gaute Storaas; Innan vintern kommer – Armand Amar	**Best Art Direction**: **Ted: För kärlekens skull – Ulrika von Vegesack**; Balkan Noir – Emma Sofia Wahlberg; Becoming Astrid – Linda Janson
**Best Visual Effects**: **Border – Peter Hjorth**; Den blomstertid nu kommer – Crazy Pictures and Jacob Danell; Sune vs Sune – Fredrik Pihl	**Best Documentary Feature**: **Reconstructing Utøya – Carl Javér**; The Deminer – Hogir Hirori; The Raft – Marcus Lindeen
**Best Shortfilm**: **Martyren – Ahmed Abdullahi**; The Ambassador's Wife – Theresa Traoré Dahlberg; As We're Told – Erik Holmström and Fredrik Wenzel	**Best Foreign Film**: **(Japan) Shoplifters – Hirokazu Kore-eda**; (United States) BlacKkKlansman – Spike Lee; (Poland) Cold War – Paweł Pawlikowski
**Gullspiran**: **Linda Hambäck**	**Honorary Award**: **Yvonne Lombard, actress**
**Newcomer Award**: **Crazy Pictures, Film Collective**	**Audience Award**: **The Cake General – Renée Axö, Martin Söder & Lars Beckung**; Den blomstertid nu kommer – Crazy Pictures; Vill du dansa? – Matz Eklund

=== Films with multiple nominations and awards ===
Films that received multiple nominations
Nominations	Film
9	Border
6	Goliath
6	Becoming Astrid
4	Amateurs
3	Den blomstertid nu kommer
3	Sune vs Sune
3	The Cake General
2	The Deminer
2	Euphoria
2	The Raft
2	Jimmie
2	Reconstructing Utøya
2	The Real Estate
2	Garden Lane
2	X & Y

== See also ==
- 91st Academy Awards
- 76th Golden Globe Awards
- 72nd British Academy Film Awards
- 25th Screen Actors Guild Awards
- 24th Critics' Choice Awards
- 23rd Satellite Awards
- 39th Golden Raspberry Awards
