= Scharliina =

Finnish-Swedish singer-songwriter, actress, and model

Scharliina Eräpuro (born October 18, 1999), known artistically as Scharliina, is a Finnish-Swedish singer-songwriter, actress, and model. She is a member of the Swedish pop duo Lightworkers. Eräpuro appeared in the UK TV series Corner Shop and the Swedish Discovery+ series Skitsamma.

The singer headlined Miss Supranational Finland 2021.

== Filmography ==
Title	Year
Corner Shop Show (TV Series)	2019
Corner Shop: Thank You, Come Again	2019
Psychosis in Stockholm (film)	2020
Skitsamma (TV Series)	2021

== Discography ==
=== Singles ===
Running	Released: April 15, 2020; Formats: LP, CD, digital download
Paradigm	Released: July 15, 2020; Formats: LP, CD, digital download

=== As featured artist ===
- "For You" (Latencies ft Scharliina)
