= 53rd Guldbagge Awards =

Swedish awards ceremony

- Date: 22 January 2018
- Site: Cirkus, Stockholm
- Hosted by: Petra Mede

Highlights
- Best Picture: The Nile Hilton Incident
- Most awards: The Nile Hilton Incident (5)
- Most nominations: Borg McEnroe (10)

Television coverage
- Network: SVT
- Duration: 2 hours

The 53rd Guldbagge Awards ceremony, presented by the Swedish Film Institute, honoring the best Swedish films of 2017 and took place on January 22, 2018 at Cirkus in Stockholm. The ceremony was televised by SVT, and comedian Petra Mede hosted the ceremony for the sixth time. She previously hosted the 46th, 47th, 50th, 51st, and 52nd ceremonies. The nominees were presented on January 4, 2018.

This year, the category Cinema Audience Award has been retired, and replaced by the Audience Award, presented by the Film Institute in collaboration with the newspaper Aftonbladet, which houses the vote.

== Winners and nominees ==
The nominees for the 53rd Guldbagge Awards were announced on 4 January 2018 in Stockholm, by the Swedish Film Institute.

=== Awards ===
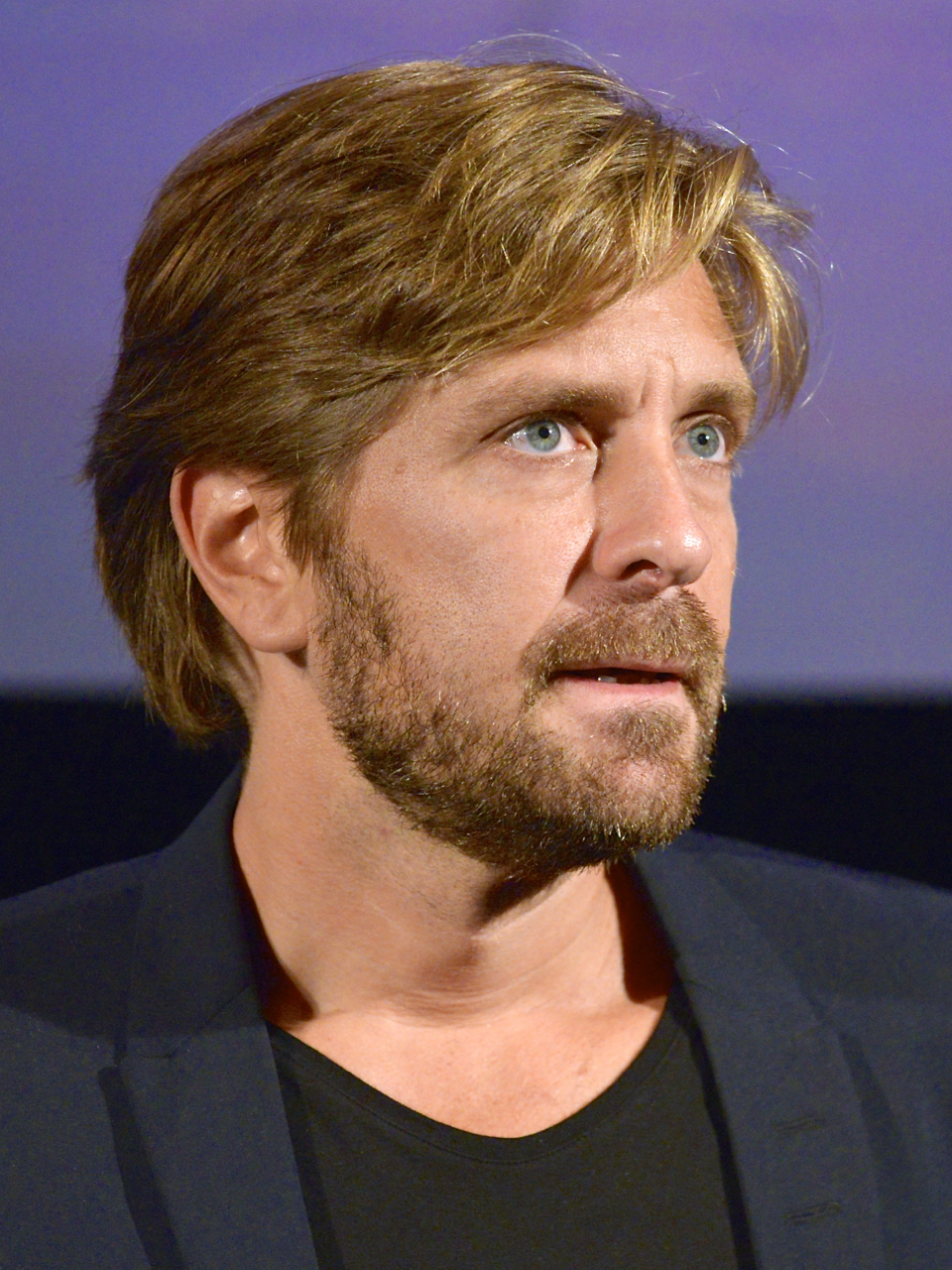
Ruben Östlund, Best Director winner

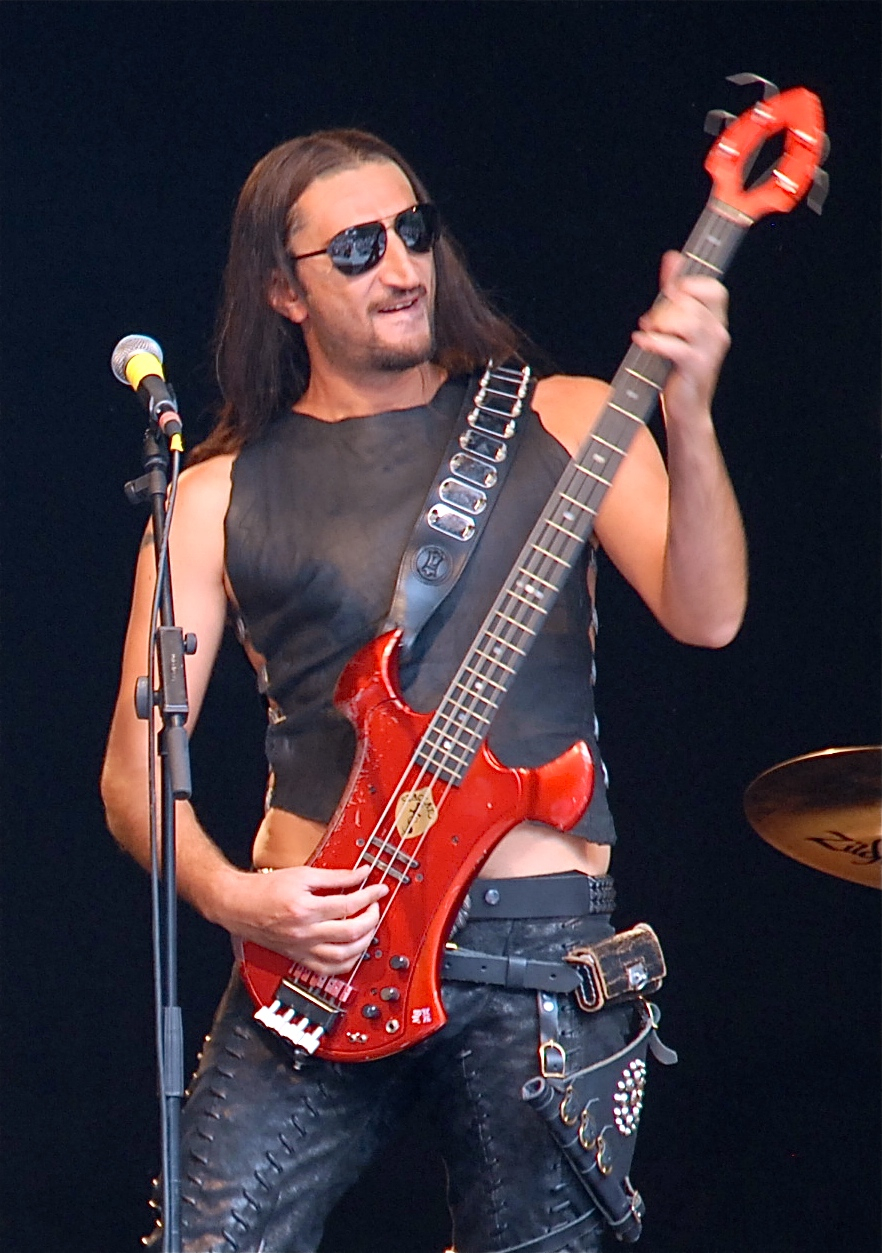
Fares Fares, Best Actor winner

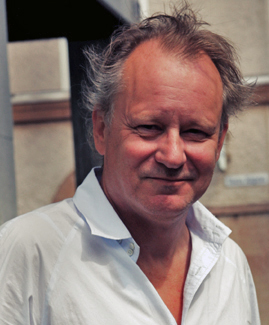
Stellan Skarsgård, Best Supporting Actor winner

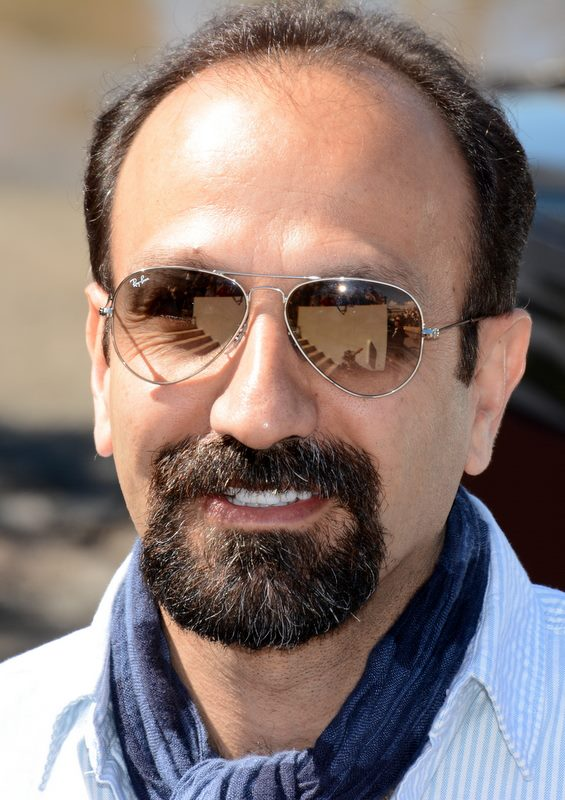
Asghar Farhadi, Best Foreign Film winner

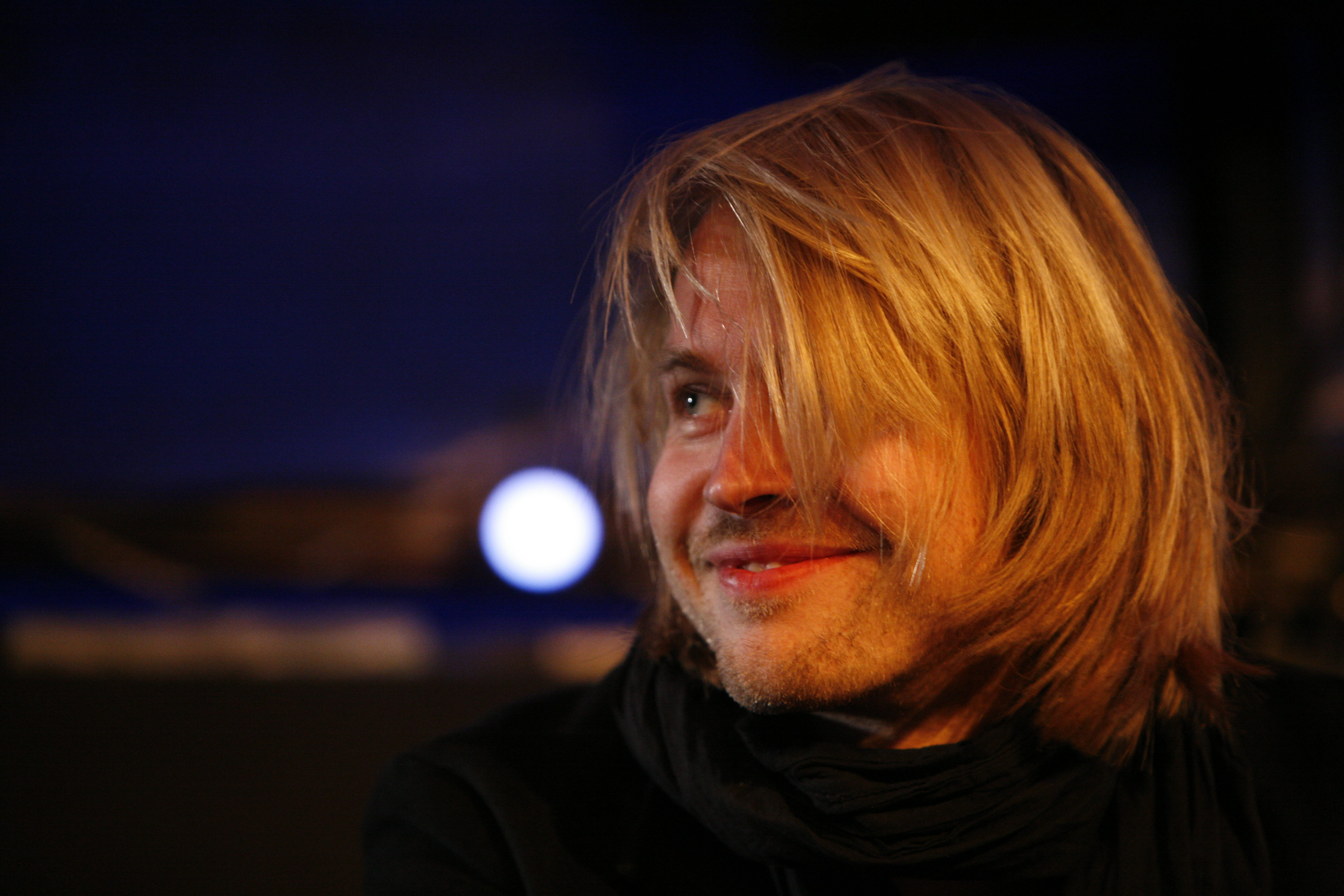
Peter van Poehl, Best Score winner

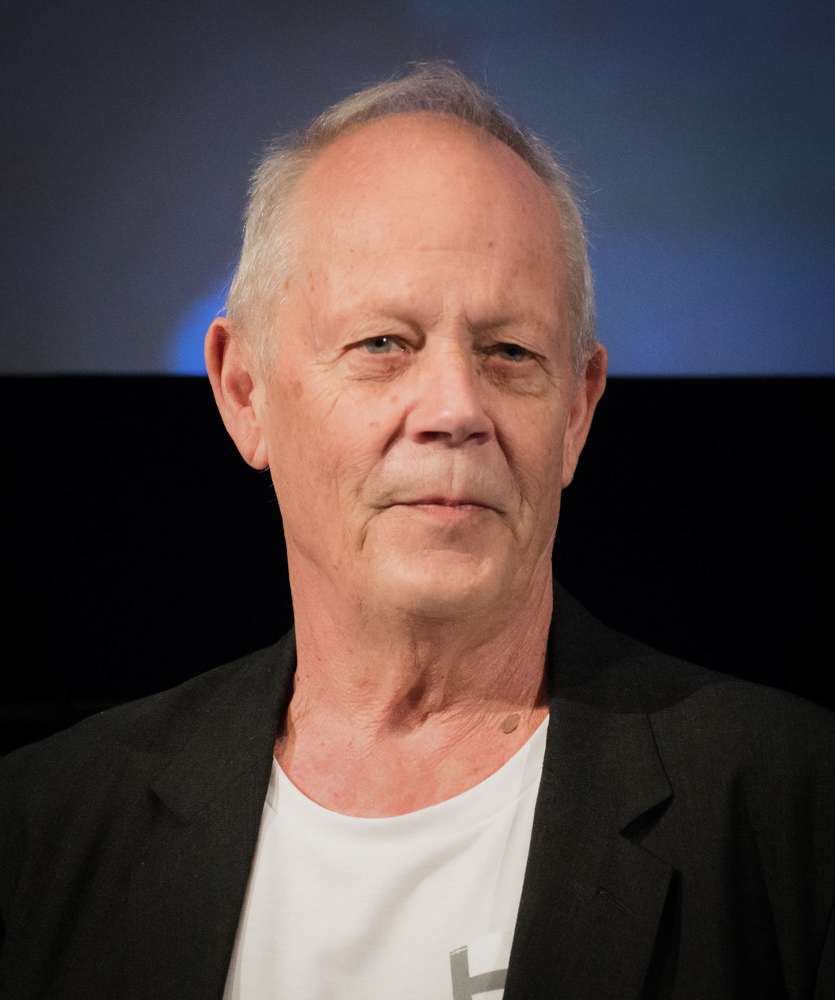
Stig Björkman, Honorary Award winner

Winners are listed first and highlighted in boldface.

**Best Film**: **The Nile Hilton Incident – Kristina Åberg**; Borg McEnroe – Jon Nohrstedt and Fredrik Wikström Nicastro; Ravens – Jan Marnell, Tom Persson and Jens Assur; Sami Blood – Lars G. Lindström; The Square – Erik Hemmendorff and Philippe Bober	**Best Director**: **Ruben Östlund – The Square**; Amanda Kernell – Sami Blood; Janus Metz – Borg McEnroe; Tarik Saleh – The Nile Hilton Incident
**Best Actress in a leading role**: **Lene Cecilia Sparrok – Sami Blood as Elle Marja**; Evin Ahmad – Beyond Dreams as Mirja; Jennie Silfverhjelm – All Inclusive as Malin; Mia Skäringer – Solsidan as Anna	**Best Actor in a leading role**: **Fares Fares – The Nile Hilton Incident as Noredin Mostafa**; Claes Bang – The Square as Christian; Reine Brynolfsson – Ravens as Agne; Sverrir Gudnason – Borg McEnroe as Björn Borg
**Best Supporting Actress**: **Julia Kijowska – Strawberry Days as Agnieszka**; Gizem Erdogan – Beyond Dreams as Sarah; Maria Heiskanen – Ravens as Gärd; Mia Erika Sparrok – Sami Blood as Njenna	**Best Supporting Actor**: **Stellan Skarsgård – Borg McEnroe as Lennart Bergelin**; Shia LaBeouf – Borg McEnroe as John McEnroe; Yaser Maher – The Nile Hilton Incident as Kammal Mostafa; Przemyslaw Sadowski – Strawberry Days as Jan
**Best Screenplay**: **Amanda Kernell – Sami Blood**; Maud Nycander, Jannike Åhlund and Kersti Grunditz Brennan – Citizen Schein; Can Demirtas and Ivica Zubak – A Hustler's Diary; Ruben Östlund – The Square	**Best Cinematography**: **The Square – Fredrik Wenzel**; Ravens – Jonas Alarik; Sami Blood – Sophia Olsson
**Best Editing**: **Sami Blood – Anders Skov**; Borg McEnroe – Per Sandholt and Per K. Kirkegaard; Citizen Schein – Kersti Grunditz Brennan	**Best Costume Design**: **The Nile Hilton Incident – Louize Nissen**; Borg McEnroe – Kicki Ilander; Para knas – Sharareh Hosseini and David Markfant
**Best Sound Editing**: **The Nile Hilton Incident – Fredrik Jonsäter**; Ravens – Mattias Eklund; Silvana – Mira Falk and Brian Dyrby	**Makeup and Hair**: **Solsidan – Petra Cabbe**; All Inclusive – Sara Klänge; The Nile Hilton Incident – Dorothea Wiedermann
**Best Original Score**: **Ravens – Peter von Poehl**; Borg McEnroe – Jonas Struck, Jon Ekstrand and Vladislav Delay; Citizen Schein – Karl Frid and Pär Frid	**Best Art Direction**: **The Nile Hilton Incident – Roger Rosenberg**; Borg McEnroe – Lina Nordqvist; The Square – Josefin Åsberg
**Best Documentary Feature**: **Silvana – Mika Gustafson, Olivia Kastebring and Christina Tsiobanelis**; Letters to a Serial Killer – Manal Masri; The Celestial Darkroom – Nils Petter Löfstedt	**Best Shortfilm**: **The Burden – Niki Lindroth von Bahr**; Night Child – Sanna Lenken; Studio 5 – Maximilien Van Aertryck and Axel Danielson
**Best Foreign Film**: **(Iran) (France) The Salesman – Asghar Farhadi**; (France) BPM (Beats per Minute) – Robin Campillo; (United States) Moonlight – Barry Jenkins	**Best Visual Effects**: **Borg McEnroe – Torbjörn Olsson and Alex Hansson**; Ravens – Torbjörn Olsson; Monky – Alex Hansson and Chris Stenner
**Gullspiran**: **BUFF International Film Festival**	**Honorary Award**: **Stig Björkman**
**Newcomer Award**: **Rojda Sekersöz**	**Audience Award**: **Sami Blood – Lars G. Lindström**; Solsidan – Emma Nyberg; Superswede – Mia Sohlman

=== Films with multiple nominations and awards ===
Films that received multiple nominations
Nominations	Film
10	Borg McEnroe
8	The Nile Hilton Incident
7	Ravens
7	Sami Blood
6	The Square
3	Citizen Schein
2	All Inclusive
2	The Burden
2	Strawberry Days
2	Silvana
2	Solsidan

Films that received multiple awards
Awards	Film
5	The Nile Hilton Incident
4	Sami Blood
2	Borg McEnroe
2	The Square

== See also ==
- 90th Academy Awards
- 75th Golden Globe Awards
- 71st British Academy Film Awards
- 24th Screen Actors Guild Awards
- 23rd Critics' Choice Awards
- 22nd Satellite Awards
- 38th Golden Raspberry Awards
