= Nelly Rapp – Monster Agent =

2020 feature film from Amanda Adolfsson

- Directed by: Amanda Adolfsson
- Written by: Sofie Forsman
- Produced by: Jon Nohrstedt; Niklas Larsson
- Starring: Matilda Gross; Johan Rheborg; Marianne Mörck; Björn Gustafsson; Lily Wahlsteen
- Cinematography: Gabriel Mkrttchian
- Edited by: Britta Norell
- Music by: Uno Helmersson
- Production company: SF Studios
- Distributed by: SF Studios
- Release date: October 23, 2020
- Running time: 92 minutes
- Country: Sweden
- Language: Swedish

Nelly Rapp – Monster Agent is a 2020 Swedish feature film directed by Amanda Adolfsson. Produced by Jon Nohrstedt and Niklas Larsson, the film stars Matilda Gross, Johan Rheborg, Marianne Mörck, Björn Gustafsson, and Lily Wahlsteen. Based on the titular Swedish children book character Nelly Rapp, the plot follows the story of Nelly who spends autumn break with her uncle Hannibal.

Critics received the film with generally favourable reviews, with praise towards its fast-paced action, humor, and visual presentation. At the 56th Guldbagge Awards, the film received five nominations, including Best Art Direction, Best Actress in a Supporting Role, and Best Original Score, winning for Best Costume Design and Best Makeup and Hair.

== Plot ==
The plot follows Nelly, a 10-year old who has no friends. Nelly and her dog London, decide to spend the autumn holidays with her eccentric uncle Hannibal. Hannibal lives in a spooky mansion in the country, with housekeeper Lena-Sleva. However, Nelly does not know that Hannibal does not live a normal life and that he is a monster agent. She is soon surrounded by vampires, ghosts, werewolves, and Frankenstein, and embarks on an adventure where everything she previously believed in is put to test.

== Cast ==
- Matilda Gross as Nelly Rapp
- Johan Rheborg as Hannibal
- Marianne Mörck as Lena-Sleva
- Björn Gustafsson as Vincent
- Lily Wahlsteen as Roberta
- Emma Broomé as Werewolf Vanja
- Amy Deasismont as Ghost Albertina
- David Wiberg as Luke the Vampire
- Elisabeth Wernesjö as priest
- Stephen Rappaport as vampire and cage
- Peter Lorentzon as military
- Leif Edlund as customer in sausage kiosk
- Jens Ohlin as Lennart
- Ove Wolf as sausage man
- Fredrik Dahl as craftsman
- Margareta Olsson as old professor
- Hannah Alem Davidson as postman
- Ebba Fichtelius as monster
- Rebecca Kaneld as Eva

== Reception ==
Contemporary critics praised the film for its fast-paced action, humor, and visual presentation. Sydsvenskan critic Oscar Westerholm described Nelly Rapp – Monster Agent as "an atmospheric, well-made and at times genuinely beautiful thriller which, despite the intended target group being ten-year-olds, on several occasions got a weather-beaten old horror film addict as signed to jump in the cinema armchair". Helena Lindblad of Dagens Nyheter agreed and viewed it as "a colorful, imaginative and fast-paced film with a big warm heart that beats for everyone who does not really fit in". Hynek Pallas, in his piece for Göteborgs-Posten believed that although the film is "transformed into a series of varying quality, the message remains the same". Writing for Aftonbladet, Stefan Hedmark called the film a "cozy autumn rush", elaborating that it is "just right scary for the little ones and a wonderful mix of sweet and salty among the Halloween sweets". In a more critical review, Svenska Dagbladet's Jon Asp criticized the film saying that it lacked the aspects of a thriller.

At the 56th Guldbagge Awards, Nelly Rapp – Monster Agent received five nominations, including Best Art Direction, Best Actress in a Supporting Role, and Best Original Score, winning for Best Costume Design and Best Makeup and Hair.

Year	Award	Category	Nominee(s)	Result	Ref.
2020	56th Guldbagge Awards	Best Costume Design	Kicki Ilander	Won	
2020	56th Guldbagge Awards	Best Makeup and Hair	Hanna Holm Löfgren, Eva von Bahr, and Love Larson	Won	
2020	56th Guldbagge Awards	Best Actress in a Supporting Role	Marianne Mörck	Nominated	
2020	56th Guldbagge Awards	Best Art Direction	Christian Olander	Nominated	
2020	56th Guldbagge Awards	Best Original Score	Uno Helmersson	Nominated	
