= Borg vs McEnroe =

2017 film by Janus Metz Pedersen

- Theatrical release poster
- Directed by: Janus Metz Pedersen
- Written by: Ronnie Sandahl
- Produced by: Jon Nohrstedt; Fredrik Wikström Nicastro
- Starring: Sverrir Guðnason; Shia LaBeouf; Stellan Skarsgård; Tuva Novotny; Robert Emms
- Cinematography: Niels Thastum
- Music by: Vladislav Delay; Jon Ekstrand; Carl-Johan Sevedag; Jonas Struck
- Production companies: SF Studios; Yellow Film & TV
- Distributed by: Nordisk Film
- Release dates: 7 September 2017 (2017 Toronto International Film Festival); 8 September 2017 (Sweden); 14 September 2017 (Denmark); 13 October 2017 (Finland)
- Running time: 108 minutes
- Countries: Sweden; Denmark; Finland
- Languages: English; Swedish
- Budget: 65 million SEK ($7.5 million)
- Box office: $3.4 million

Borg vs McEnroe (Swedish: Borg, Finnish: Borg/McEnroe) is a 2017 biographical sports drama film, focusing on the famous professional rivalry between tennis players, Björn Borg and John McEnroe at the 1980 Wimbledon Championships, culminating in their encounter in the men's singles final, one of the most dramatic tennis matches of all time. The film, a production between Sweden, Denmark and Finland, was directed by Janus Metz Pedersen, from a screenplay written by Ronnie Sandahl, and stars Sverrir Guðnason, Shia LaBeouf, Stellan Skarsgård, Tuva Novotny and Robert Emms. The film opened the 2017 Toronto International Film Festival.

== Synopsis ==
In 1980, disciplined Swedish tennis champion Björn Borg and abrasive American upstart John McEnroe prepare to compete at Wimbledon. As the number one ranked player in the world, Borg is under enormous pressure to win his fifth consecutive Wimbledon title. Living in Monaco with his fiancée, Mariana, Borg is uncomfortable with his celebrity status and Mariana struggles with the lack of control over their lives.

Taking up tennis at an early age, young Borg is suspended due to angry outbursts on the court. Retired champion and Davis Cup captain Lennart Bergelin notices Borg's potential and his unusual backhand, then becomes his coach. Borg struggles with his temper and clashes with Bergelin, who is pressured to enter 15-year-old Björn as the youngest ever Davis Cup player. Bergelin relents but urges Borg to hide his emotions and channel them into his game.

As a child, McEnroe idolizes Borg and is a gifted student but struggles with his parents' high expectations. By age 21, McEnroe is tennis' number two ranked player and a rising star, determined to win his first Wimbledon title. In sharp comparison to the famously unflappable Borg, McEnroe is also prone to aggressive outbursts and confrontations with umpires, much like Borg in his youth.

Arriving in London, Borg sets out his meticulous Wimbledon routine, and McEnroe draws his own tournament bracket on his hotel room wall. They proceed through the first and second rounds, and McEnroe and fellow player Vitas Gerulaitis discuss rumors of Borg's superstitious habits, including fine-tuning his rackets and cooling rooms to lower his heart rate.

When his third-round match is paused due to rain, an overwhelmed Borg lashes out at Bergelin and Mariana. Flashbacks to Borg winning his first French Open in 1974 and Wimbledon two years later, as each tournament's youngest player ever, emphasize the pressure his career has placed on him. That night, Bergelin and Mariana commiserate over the toll Björn's success has taken on their lives.

In the quarter-final, McEnroe faces his own doubles partner Peter Fleming. The day of the match, he snubs Fleming, who accuses him of stealing his ankle brace. McEnroe wins and tries to reconcile, but Fleming warns McEnroe that he is not well liked and will only be remembered for his temper, not his skill. McEnroe's father arrives in London to watch him play.

Borg wins his semi-final match but still struggles to cope with the pressure. A year earlier, he agrees to recreate a home movie for a television interview — playing tennis outside his childhood home in Stockholm — but becomes agitated when he is unable to relive the exact experience, and leaves. At Wimbledon, Borg is comforted by Bergelin and reaffirms his commitment to win.

McEnroe's reputation and confrontational attitude lead him to be booed by the crowd throughout his semi-final match. He wins but storms out of a contentious post-game press conference and later completes his handmade bracket: Borg faces McEnroe in the Wimbledon final.

The final match begins, with public confidence high for Borg's anticipated fifth title, while McEnroe is booed again. McEnroe unexpectedly dominates the first set, but Borg wins the second. McEnroe chooses not to overreact to debatable calls, and receives brief words of encouragement from Borg, who wins the third set. The fourth set results in an unprecedented and punishing tie break, won by McEnroe. Despite holding seven match points in the fourth set, five of which came in the tie-break, Borg goes on to win the fifth set and the title, while McEnroe's sportsmanship receives a standing ovation.

At the airport, Borg and McEnroe part on friendly terms. An epilogue reveals that McEnroe defeated Borg at the following Wimbledon championship, with Borg retiring that year at the age of 25, but they later became close friends — "Former rivals, best enemies".

== Cast ==
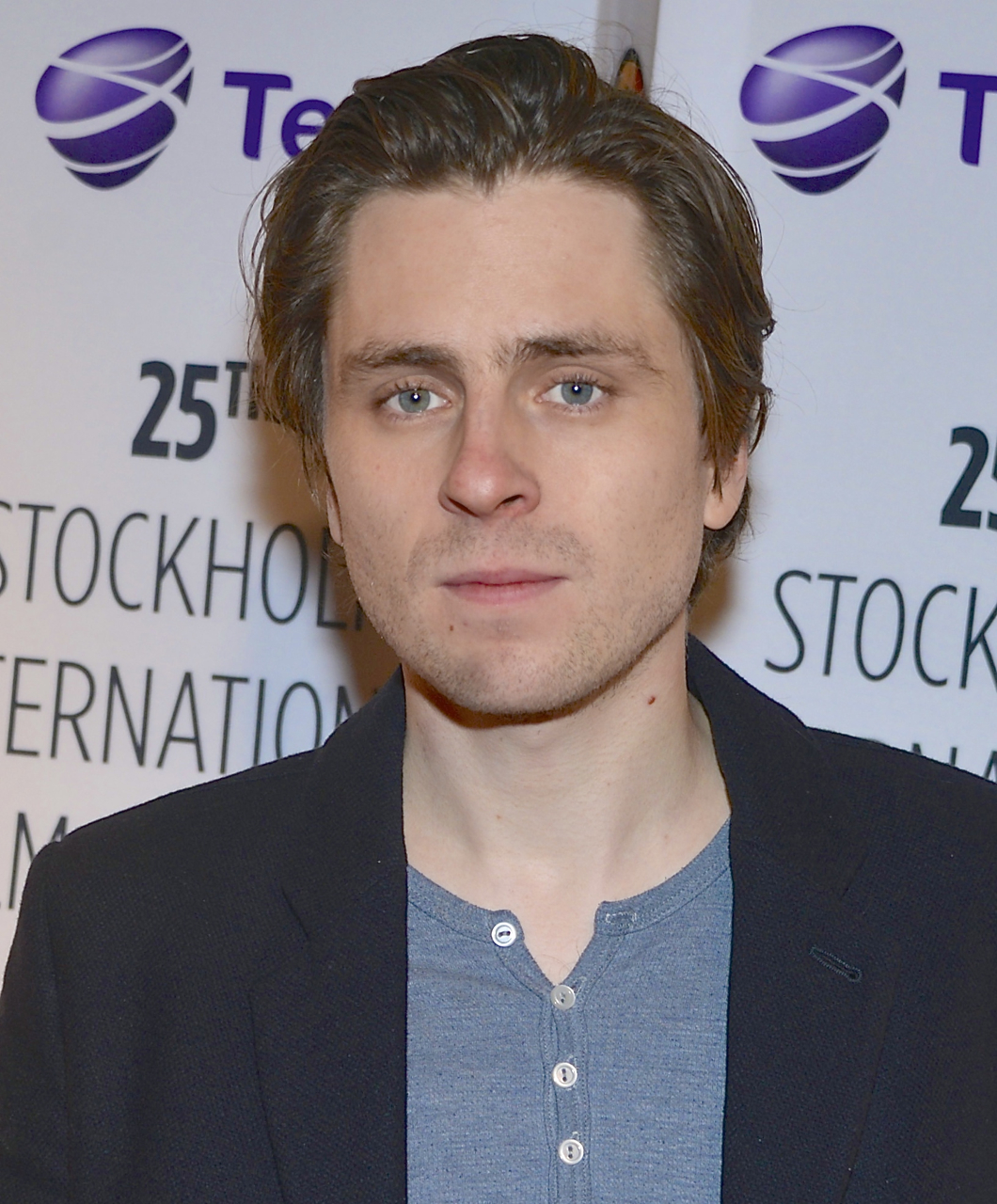
Sverrir Guðnason plays Björn Borg.

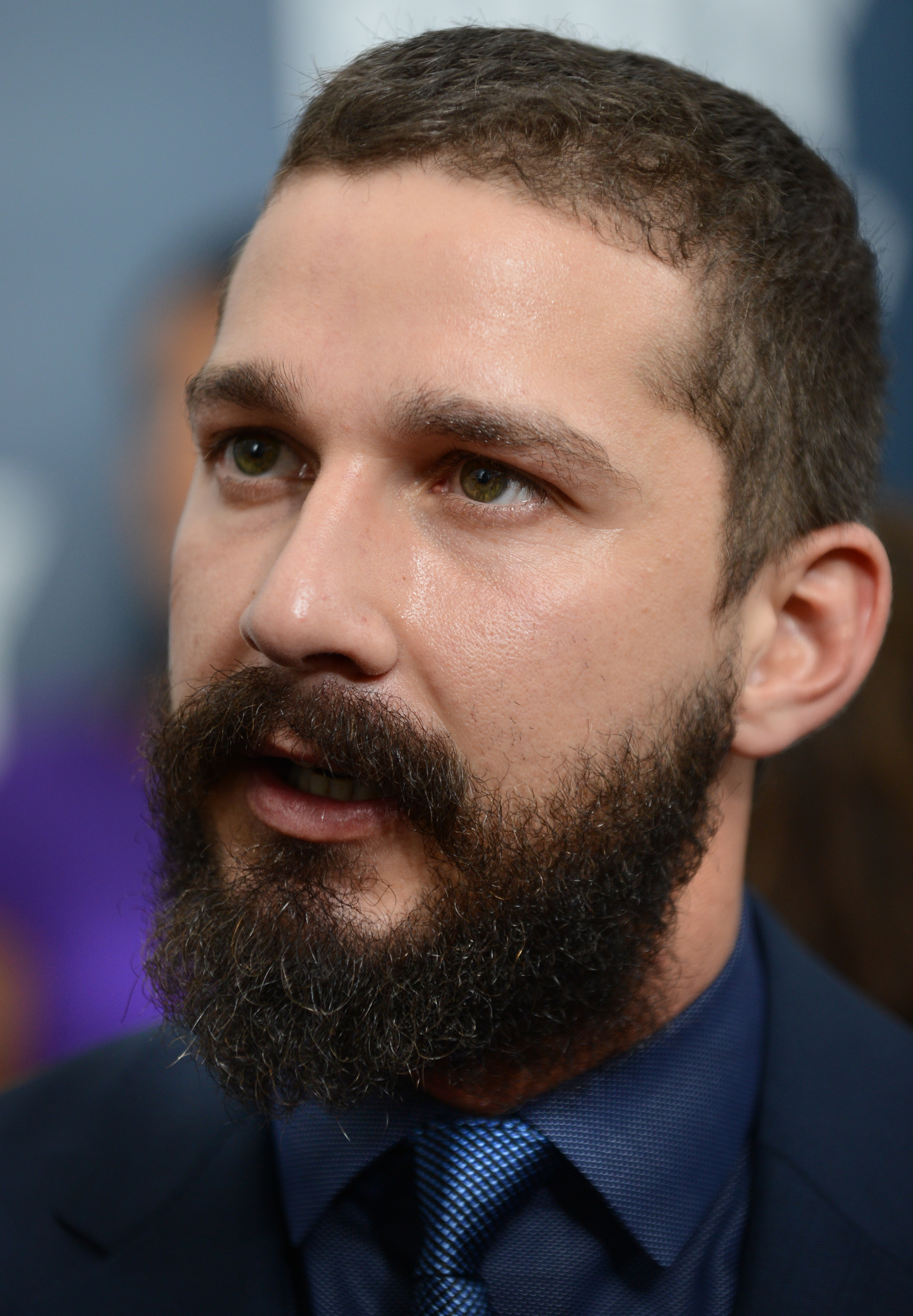
Shia LaBeouf plays John McEnroe.

- Sverrir Guðnason as Björn Borg:
  A Swedish former world no. 1 tennis player. Screenwriter Ronnie Sandahl stated in interviews with Swedish newspapers Expressen and Sydsvenskan that Sverrir "looks very much like the Swedish tennis star". In an interview, Gudnason talked about his preparation for the part, and stated that he "spent six months in which he trained 15 hours a week, with two hours of tennis and four workouts with a personal trainer." He also revealed that he had not met Borg, stating "not yet, but I will meet him, sometime after the shooting of the film." Leo Borg, the real-life son of Björn Borg, portrays his father from age 9 to 14, while actor Markus Mossberg portrays him from age 14 to 17.
- Shia LaBeouf as John McEnroe:
  An American former world no. 1 professional tennis player and Borg's rival. Sandahl stated in an interview that it was LaBeouf that made contact with the production when he heard about the script, because he "identifies strongly with the character of McEnroe, and felt that he is a misunderstood person." In an interview with Variety, Shia praised the script and called it "brilliant", and said that he "cried when reading it for the first time." He also revealed that he has not met with McEnroe about the role, stating "haven't met him yet, but I'm eager to meet him before we shoot. I got nothing but love and respect for him."
- Stellan Skarsgård as Lennart Bergelin:
  A retired Swedish tennis player and Borg's coach. This is his first role in a Swedish film since he starred in the films Arn – The Knight Templar and Arn – The Kingdom at Road's End. Skarsgård described and compared the relationship between Bergelin and Borg to the rivalry between Mozart and Salieri in the 1984 film Amadeus: "people think that Salieri was jealous of Mozart, but I do not think that's the right word. I think it's more an utter fascination and love of the genius. And the self-doubt that you are not capable."
- Tuva Novotny as Mariana Simionescu: A Romanian tennis player and Borg's fiancée.
- Robert Emms as Vitas Gerulaitis: An American professional tennis player with a playboy lifestyle.
- Jason Forbes as Arthur Ashe
- Björn Granath as Bengt Grive
- Scott Arthur as Peter Fleming
- Tom Datnow as Jimmy Connors
- Jane Perry as Kay McEnroe, John's mother
- Thomas Hedengran as Lennart Hyland

== Production ==
=== Development ===
In May 2016, a film about tennis rivals Björn Borg and John McEnroe was in development. Janus Metz Pedersen was chosen to direct the film, from a screenplay written by Swedish writer Ronnie Sandahl. Pedersen is mostly known for directing the 2010 documentary film Armadillo and one episode of the HBO drama True Detective. The film was produced by Jon Nohrstedt, who produced the Swedish animated film Bamse and the City of Thieves, and Fredrik Wikström Nicastro, who is best known for producing the 2010 film Easy Money. The film is distributed by Nordisk Film in Scandinavia and internationally by SF Studios.

=== Casting ===
In May 2016, Sverrir Guðnason and Shia LaBeouf were cast as Björn Borg and John McEnroe, respectively. In an interview with Variety at the 2016 Cannes Film Festival, LaBeouf was excited about the script and working with Scandinavian directors, stating, "They make better movies. Scandinavian film making is different. It's a different pace, a different relationship between the crew—the bonds are different".

Stellan Skarsgård had been cast as Borg's coach Lennart Bergelin, which is his first role in a Swedish film in several years. Tuva Novotny and Robert Emms had joined the cast as Mariana Simionescu and Vitas Gerulaitis, respectively.

=== Filming ===
The filming began in August 2016, and took place in Gothenburg, Prague, London, and Monaco. Filming also took place in Borg's hometown of Södertälje, where he grew up, and started playing tennis as a child. The production has recreated the Studio 54 nightclub at a studio in Gothenburg. The tennis arena at I. ČLTK Prague in Štvanice, Prague, stands in for the Centre Court arena in Wimbledon, London, where they shot the finals of the 1980 Wimbledon Championships. Gudnason described that he felt "a huge sense of authenticity, when I [he] and Shia walked from the changing room to what [was] supposed to look like the Centre Court arena, before hundreds of extras".

In October, the first set photos of Sverrir Guðnason and Shia LaBeouf as Björn Borg and John McEnroe, respectively, were released.

== Release ==
Borg vs McEnroe opened the 2017 Toronto International Film Festival, concurrent with its Swedish theatrical release. It was released in the UK on September 22, and was released in the U.S. 13 April 2018.

== Reception ==
=== Critical response ===
On the review aggregator website Rotten Tomatoes, the film has an approval rating of 84%, based on 147 reviews, with an average rating of 6.5/10. The website's consensus reads, "Borg vs McEnroe makes tennis improbably cinematic -- and brings the absolute best out of Shia LaBeouf, who delivers some of the best work of his career." On Metacritic, the film has a weighted average score of 63 out of 100, based on 30 critic reviews, indicating "generally favorable reviews".

Peter Debruge of Variety magazine praised director Janus Metz: "When the big tennis finale arrives, Metz finds all sorts of ways to make the match interesting, blending urgent music, creative camera vantages and ridiculously hyperbolic announcer commentary to generate the desired tension. But the real reason we're invested is far simpler than that: Metz and his cast have made us care about both Borg and McEnroe by this point."

John DeFore of The Hollywood Reporter called it "An acting-forward sports film capable of engaging viewers who don't know their 30-loves from their birdies or hat tricks."

=== Accolades ===
Award	Date of ceremony	Category	Recipients	Result	Ref.
Camerimage International Film Festival	11–18 November 2017	Best Directorial Debut	Janus Metz Pedersen	Won	
Guldbagge Awards	22 January 2018	Best Film	Jon Nohrstedt and Fredrik Wikström Nicastro (Producers)	Nominated	
Guldbagge Awards	22 January 2018	Best Director	Janus Metz Pedersen	Nominated	
Guldbagge Awards	22 January 2018	Best Actor	Sverrir Gudnason	Nominated	
Guldbagge Awards	22 January 2018	Best Supporting Actor	Shia LaBeouf	Nominated	
Guldbagge Awards	22 January 2018	Best Supporting Actor	Stellan Skarsgård	Won	
Guldbagge Awards	22 January 2018	Best Editing	Per Sandholt and Per K Kirkegaard	Nominated	
Guldbagge Awards	22 January 2018	Best Costume Design	Kicki Ilander	Nominated	
Guldbagge Awards	22 January 2018	Best Original Score	Jonas Struck, Jon Ekstrand and Vladislav Delay	Nominated	
Guldbagge Awards	22 January 2018	Best Art Direction	Lina Nordqvist	Nominated	
Guldbagge Awards	22 January 2018	Best Visual Effects	Torbjörn Olsson and Alex Hansson	Won	
Noordelijk Film Festival	12 November 2017	Public Prize	Borg McEnroe	Won	

== See also ==
- Borg–McEnroe rivalry
