= Guldbagge Award for Best Foreign Film =

Swedish film award

- Country: Sweden
- Presented by: Swedish Film Institute
- First award: 1987 (for films released during the 1987 film season)
- Final award: 2021 (for films released during the 2021 film season)
- Website: guldbaggen.se

The Guldbagge for Best Foreign Film is a Swedish film award presented annually by the Swedish Film Institute (SFI) as part of the Guldbagge Awards (Swedish: "Guldbaggen").

The category was discontinued, after four years of evaluation, as of the 58th gala, in 2023. In the last years it was called Best International Film.

== Winners and nominees ==
Each Guldbagge Awards ceremony is listed chronologically below along with the winner of the Guldbagge Award for Best Foreign Film and the director associated with the award. Before 1991 the awards did not announce nominees, only winners. In the columns under the winner of each award are the other nominees for best foreign film, which are listed from 1991 and forward.

Winners before the nomination system (1964–1990)
Winners under the nomination system (1991–present)

=== 1980s ===
Year	Film	Original title(s)	Country	Director(s)	Language(s)	Ref.
1987 (23rd)	Bagdad Cafe‡	Out of Rosenheim	(West Germany) Germany (West)	Percy Adlon	German, English	
1988 (24th)	— (no award given)	— (no award given)	— (no award given)	— (no award given)	— (no award given)	
1989 (25th)	A World Apart‡		{co-production} United Kingdom; Zimbabwe	Chris Menges	English	

=== 1990s ===
Year	Film	Original title(s)	Country	Director(s)	Language(s)	Ref.
1990 (26th)	Time of the Gypsies‡	Dom za vešanje Дом за вешање	(Socialist Federal Republic of Yugoslavia) Yugoslavia	Emir Kusturica	Romani, Serbo-Croatian & Italian	
1991 (27th)	Monsieur Hire‡		France	Patrice Leconte	French	
1991 (27th)	The Double Life of Véronique	La double vie de Véronique	{co-production} France; Norway; Poland	Krzysztof Kieślowski	French & Polish	
1991 (27th)	The Fisher King		United States	Terry Gilliam	English	
1992 (28th)	Husbands and Wives‡		United States	Woody Allen	English	
1992 (28th)	Raise the Red Lantern	Dà Hóng Dēnglong Gāogāo Guà 大紅燈籠高高掛	{co-production} China; Hong Kong; Taiwan	Zhang Yimou	Mandarin	
1992 (28th)	Fried Green Tomatoes		United States	Jon Avnet	English	
1993 (29th)	The Piano‡		{co-production} New Zealand; Australia; France	Jane Campion	English, Māori & British Sign Language	
1993 (29th)	Three Colors: Blue	Trois couleurs: Bleu	France, Poland & Switzerland	Krzysztof Kieślowski	French & Polish	
1993 (29th)	Orlando		United Kingdom	Sally Potter	English	
1994 (30th)	Short Cuts‡		United States	Robert Altman	English	
1994 (30th)	Forrest Gump		United States	Robert Zemeckis	English	
1994 (30th)	Schindler's List		United States	Steven Spielberg	English	
1995 (31st)	Before the Rain‡	Pred doždot Пред дождот	{co-production} (North Macedonia) Macedonia; United Kingdom	Milcho Manchevski	Macedonian, English & Albanian	
1995 (31st)	Lamerica		Italy	Gianni Amelio	Italian & Albanian	
1995 (31st)	Bullets over Broadway		United States	Woody Allen	English	
1996 (32nd)	Breaking the Waves‡		Denmark	Lars von Trier	English	
1996 (32nd)	Fargo		United States	Joel Coen	English	
1996 (32nd)	Trainspotting		United Kingdom	Danny Boyle	English	
1997 (33rd)	The Ice Storm‡		United States	Ang Lee	English	
1997 (33rd)	Brassed Off		{co-production} United Kingdom; United States	Mark Herman	English	
1997 (33rd)	The Promise	La Promesse	{co-production} Belgium; France	Luc & Jean-Pierre Dardenne	French	
1998 (34th)	The Celebration‡	Festen	Denmark	Thomas Vinterberg	Danish	
1998 (34th)	The Dreamlife of Angels	La Vie rêvée des anges	France	Erick Zonca	French	
1998 (34th)	Character	Karakter	{co-production} Netherlands; Belgium	Mike van Diem	Dutch	
1999 (35th)	All About My Mother‡	Todo sobre mi madre	Spain	Pedro Almodóvar	Spanish	
1999 (35th)	The Straight Story		{co-production} United States; United Kingdom; France	David Lynch	English	
1999 (35th)	Central Station	Central do Brasil	{co-production} Brazil; France	Walter Salles	Portuguese	

=== 2000s ===
Year	Film	Original title(s)	Country	Director(s)	Language(s)	Ref.
2000 (36th)	Magnolia‡		United States	Paul Thomas Anderson	English, French & German	
2000 (36th)	Boys Don't Cry		United States	Kimberly Peirce	English	
2000 (36th)	American Beauty		United States	Sam Mendes	English	
2001 (37th)	Amélie‡	Le fabuleux destin d'Amélie Poulain	{co-production} France; Germany	Jean-Pierre Jeunet	French	
2001 (37th)	The Taste of Others	Le goût des autres	France	Agnès Jaoui	French	
2001 (37th)	Italian for Beginners	Italiensk for begyndere	{co-production} Denmark; Sweden	Lone Scherfig	Danish, Italian & English	
2002 (38th)	The Man Without a Past‡	Mies vailla menneisyyttä	Finland	Aki Kaurismäki	Finnish	
2002 (38th)	Talk to Her	Hable con ella	Spain	Pedro Almodóvar	Spanish	
2002 (38th)	The Royal Tenenbaums		United States	Wes Anderson	English	
2003 (39th)	The Hours‡		{co-production} United Kingdom; United States	Stephen Daldry	English	
2003 (39th)	Good Bye, Lenin!		Germany	Wolfgang Becker	German	
2003 (39th)	Dogville		Denmark	Lars von Trier	English	
2004 (40th)	The Return‡	Vozvrashcheniye; Возвращение	Russia	Andrey Zvyagintsev	Russian	
2004 (40th)	Lost in Translation		United States	Sofia Coppola	English & Japanese	
2004 (40th)	21 Grams		United States	Alejandro González Iñárritu	English	
2005 (41st)	The Child‡	L'Enfant	Belgium	Luc & Jean-Pierre Dardenne	French	
2005 (41st)	Nobody Knows	Dare mo Shiranai 誰も知らない	Japan	Hirokazu Koreeda	Japanese	
2005 (41st)	Caché		France	Michael Haneke	French	
2006 (42nd)	The Lives of Others‡	Das Leben der Anderen	Germany	Florian Henckel von Donnersmarck	German	
2006 (42nd)	To Return	Volver	Spain	Pedro Almodóvar	Spanish	
2006 (42nd)	Babel		{co-production} United States; Mexico; France	Alejandro González Iñárritu	English, Spanish, Arabic, Japanese, Japanese Sign Language & Berber	
2007 (43rd)	This Is England‡		United Kingdom	Shane Meadows	English	
2007 (43rd)	The Edge of Heaven	German: Auf der anderen Seite; Turkish: Yaşamın Kıyısında	{co-production} Germany; Turkey	Fatih Akın	German, Turkish & English	
2007 (43rd)	4 Months, 3 Weeks and 2 Days	4 luni, 3 săptămâni și 2 zile	Romania	Cristian Mungiu	Romanian	
2008 (44th)	Lust, Caution‡	Se, jie 色，戒	{co-production} United States; China; Taiwan	Ang Lee	Mandarin, Shanghainese, Cantonese, Szechwanese, Japanese, Hindi & English	
2008 (44th)	There Will Be Blood		United States	Paul Thomas Anderson	English	
2008 (44th)	No Country for Old Men		United States	Joel & Ethan Coen	English	
2009 (45th)	The White Ribbon‡	Das weiße Band, Eine deutsche Kindergeschichte	{co-production} Austria; Germany	Michael Haneke	German	
2009 (45th)	Waltz with Bashir	Hebrew: Vals im Bashir ואלס עם באשיר	{co-production} Israel; Germany; France	Ari Folman	Hebrew	
2009 (45th)	Still Walking	Aruitemo aruitemo 歩いても 歩いても	Japan	Hirokazu Koreeda	Japanese	

=== 2010s ===
Year	Film	Original title(s)	Country	Director(s)	Language(s)	Ref.
2010 (46th)	Lourdes‡		{co-production} Austria; France; Germany	Jessica Hausner	French	
2010 (46th)	The Social Network		United States	David Fincher	English	
2010 (46th)	Fish Tank		United Kingdom	Andrea Arnold	English	
2011 (47th)	A Separation‡	Jodaí-e Nadér az Simín جدایی نادر از سیمین	Iran	Asghar Farhadi	Persian	
2011 (47th)	Dogtooth	Kynodontas; Κυνόδοντας	Greece	Yorgos Lanthimos	Greek	
2011 (47th)	Winter's Bone		United States	Debra Granik	English	
2012 (48th)	Amour‡		{co-production} France; Germany; Austria	Michael Haneke	French	
2012 (48th)	Laurence Anyways		Canada	Xavier Dolan	French	
2012 (48th)	Moonrise Kingdom		United States	Wes Anderson	English	
2013 (49th)	Blue Is the Warmest Colour‡	La Vie d'Adèle – Chapitres 1 & 2	{co-production} France; Belgium; Spain	Abdellatif Kechiche	French	
2013 (49th)	12 Years a Slave		{co-production} United States; United Kingdom	Steve McQueen	English	
2013 (49th)	The Turin Horse	A torinói ló	Hungary	Béla Tarr & Ágnes Hranitzky	Hungarian	
2014 (50th)	Two Days, One Night‡	Deux jours, une nuit	{co-production} Belgium; France; Italy	Luc & Jean-Pierre Dardenne	French & Arabic	
2014 (50th)	Ida		{co-production} Poland; Denmark; France; United Kingdom	Paweł Pawlikowski	Polish, French & Latin	
2014 (50th)	Boyhood		United States	Richard Linklater	English	
2015 (51st)	Leviathan‡	Leviafan; Левиафан	Russia	Andrey Zvyagintsev	Russian	
2015 (51st)	Carol		{co-production} United Kingdom; United States	Todd Haynes	English	
2015 (51st)	Timbuktu		{co-production} France; Mauritania	Abderrahmane Sissako	Arabic, French, Tamasheq & Bambara	
2016 (52nd)	Son of Saul‡	Saul fia	Hungary	László Nemes	Hungarian	
2016 (52nd)	Toni Erdmann		{co-production} Germany; Austria	Maren Ade	German, Romanian & English	
2016 (52nd)	Mustang		{co-production} France; Turkey; Germany	Deniz Gamze Ergüven	Turkish	
2017 (53rd)	The Salesman‡	Forušande فروشنده	{co-production} Iran; France	Asghar Farhadi	Persian	
2017 (53rd)	BPM (Beats per Minute)	120 battements par minute	France	Robin Campillo	French	
2017 (53rd)	Moonlight		United States	Barry Jenkins	English	
2018 (54th)	Shoplifters‡	Manbiki Kazoku 万引き家族	Japan	Hirokazu Kore-eda	Japanese	
2018 (54th)	Cold War	Zimna wojna	{co-production} Poland; France; United Kingdom	Paweł Pawlikowski	Polish	
2018 (54th)	BlacKkKlansman		United States	Spike Lee	English	
2019 (55th)	Parasite‡	Gisaengchung 기생충	South Korea	Bong Joon-ho	Korean	
2019 (55th)	Capernaum	Kafarnāḥūm کفرناحوم	Lebanon	Nadine Labaki	Lebanese	
2019 (55th)	Marriage Story		United States	Noah Baumbach	English	

=== 2020s ===
Year	Film	Original title(s)	Country	Director(s)	Language(s)	Ref.
2020 (56th)	For Sama‡	‘min ajl sama‘ من أجل سما	{co-production} Syria; United States; United Kingdom	Waad Al-Kateab and Edward Watts	Arabic & English	
2020 (56th)	Babyteeth		Australia	Shannon Murphy	English	
2020 (56th)	Mank		United States	David Fincher	English	
2021 (57th)	Flee‡	‘Flugt‘	Denmark	Jonas Poher Rasmussen	English & Danish	
2021 (57th)	The Father		France (United Kingdom) UK	Florian Zeller	English	
2021 (57th)	Nomadland		United States	Chloé Zhao	English	

== See also ==
- Academy Award for Best Picture
- BAFTA Award for Best Film
- Golden Globe Award for Best Motion Picture – Drama
- Golden Globe Award for Best Motion Picture – Musical or Comedy
- Screen Actors Guild Award for Outstanding Performance by a Cast in a Motion Picture
- Academy Award for Best Foreign Language Film (List of Academy Award winners and nominees for Best Foreign Language Film)
- Golden Globe Award for Best Foreign Language Film
