= Guldbagge Award for Best Cinematography =

Swedish film award

- Country: Sweden
- Presented by: Swedish Film Institute
- First award: 1988 (for writing in films released during the 1988 film season)
- Currently held by: Sophia Olsson, Charter (2020)
- Website: guldbaggen.se

The Guldbagge for Best Cinematography is a Swedish film award presented annually by the Swedish Film Institute (SFI) as part of the Guldbagge Awards (Swedish: "Guldbaggen") to cinematographers working in the Swedish motion picture industry.

== Winners and nominees ==
Each Guldbagge Awards ceremony is listed chronologically below along with the winner of the Guldbagge Award for Best Cinematography and the film associated with the award. Before 1991 the awards did not announce nominees, only winners. In the columns under the winner of each award are the other nominees for best cinematography, which are listed from 1991 and forward.

Winners before the nomination system (1964–1990)
Winners under the nomination system (1991–present)

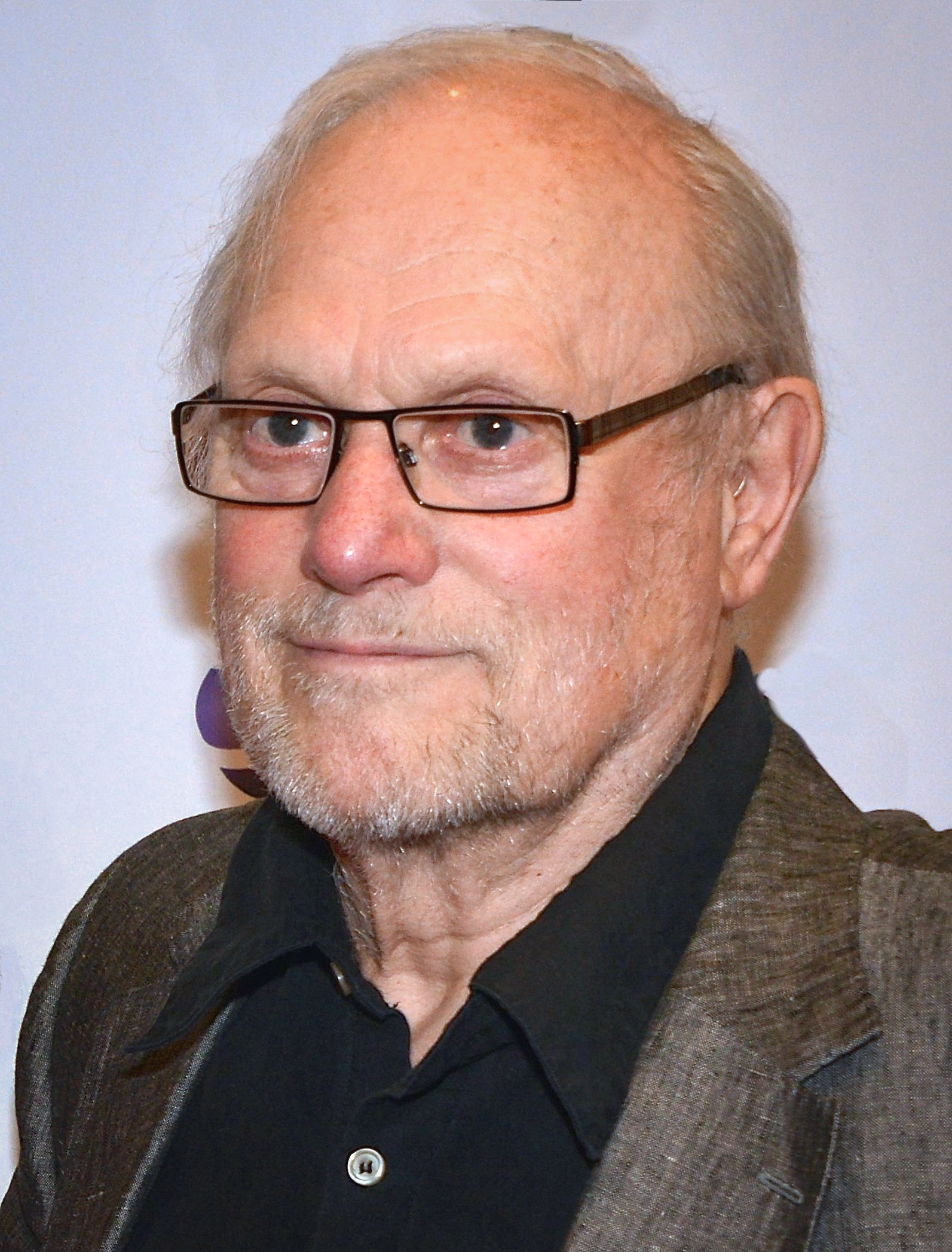
Jan Troell co-won the award in 2001 for As White as in Snow.

Year	Cinematographer	Film	Ref.
1988 (24th)	Peter Mokrosinski‡	Friends	
1989 (25th)	Göran Nilsson‡	Codename Coq Rouge	
1990 (26th)	Esa Vuorinen‡	Good Evening, Mr. Wallenberg	
1991 (27th)	Per Källberg‡	Agnes Cecilia – en sällsam historia	
1991 (27th)	Sven Nykvist	The Ox	
1991 (27th)	Jan Troell	Il Capitano: A Swedish Requiem	
1992 (28th)	Tony Forsberg‡	Sunday's Children	
1992 (28th)	Jens Fischer	Svart Lucia	
1992 (28th)	Jörgen Persson	The Best Intentions	
1992 (28th)	Jens Fischer	House of Angels	
1993 (29th)	Jens Fischer‡	Sista dansen	
1993 (29th)	Göran Nilsson	The Slingshot	
1993 (29th)	Peter Mokrosinski	The Man on the Balcony	
1994 (30th)	Harald Paalgard‡	Dreamplay	
1994 (30th)	Lars Crépin	The Hands	
1994 (30th)	Göran Nilsson	Zorn	
1995 (31st)	Jan Röed‡	Atlanten	
1995 (31st)	Göran Nilsson	Big Men, Little Men	
1995 (31st)	Stefan Kullänger	Between Summers	
1996 (32nd)	Harald Paalgard‡	Christmas Oratorio	
1996 (32nd)	Anders Bohman	The Dream Prince	
1996 (32nd)	Kjell Lagerroos	The Hunters	
1997 (33rd)	Jens Fischer‡	Beneath the Surface	
1997 (33rd)	Esa Vuorinen	Expectations	
1997 (33rd)	Per Källberg	Jag är din krigare	
1998 (34th)	Philip Øgaard‡	Glasblåsarns barn	
1998 (34th)	Mikael Kristersson	Kestrel's Eye	
1998 (34th)	Ian Wilson	Love Fools	
1999 (35th)	Anders Bohman‡	Tsatsiki, morsan och polisen	
1999 (35th)	Peter Mokrosinski	Straydogs	
1999 (35th)	Jacob Jørgensen	Zero Tolerance	
2000 (36th)	István Borbás‡ Jesper Klevenås‡	Songs from the Second Floor	
2000 (36th)	John O. Olsson	Knock Out	
2000 (36th)	Esa Vuorinen	Swedish Beauty	
2001 (37th)	Mischa Gavrjusjov‡ Jan Troell‡	As White as in Snow	
2001 (37th)	Peter Mokrosinski	Days Like This	
2001 (37th)	Jörgen Persson	A Song for Martin	
2002 (38th)	Ulf Brantås‡	Lilya 4-ever	
2002 (38th)	John Christian Rosenlund	Beck – Sista vittnet	
2002 (38th)	Lars Crépin	Everybody Loves Alice	
2003 (39th)	Peter Mokrosinski‡	Evil	
2003 (39th)	Göran Hallberg	Illusive Tracks	
2003 (39th)	Göran Hallberg	Details	
2004 (40th)	Jens Fischer‡	The Queen of Sheba's Pearls	
2004 (40th)	Harald Paalgard	As It Is in Heaven	
2004 (40th)	Leif Benjour	Four Shades of Brown	
2005 (41st)	Aril Wretblad‡	Zozo	
2005 (41st)	Anders Bohman	Mouth to Mouth	
2005 (41st)	Philip Øgaard	Kim Novak Never Swam in Genesaret's Lake	
2006 (42nd)	Linus Sandgren‡	Storm	
2006 (42nd)	Peter Gerdehag	The Horseman	
2006 (42nd)	Crille Forsberg	God Willing	
2007 (43rd)	Geir Hartly Andreassen‡	Darling	
2007 (43rd)	Eric Kress	Arn – The Knight Templar	
2007 (43rd)	Gustav Danielsson	You, the Living	
2008 (44th)	Hoyte van Hoytema‡	Let the Right One In	
2008 (44th)	Marius Dybwad Brandrud	Involuntary	
2008 (44th)	Jan Troell; Mischa Gavrjusjov	Everlasting Moments	
2009 (45th)	Hoyte van Hoytema‡	The Girl	
2009 (45th)	Eric Kress	The Girl with the Dragon Tattoo	
2009 (45th)	Peter Mokrosinski	The Girl Who Played with Fire	
2010 (46th)	Aril Wretblad‡	Easy Money	
2010 (46th)	Göran Hallberg	Behind Blue Skies	
2010 (46th)	Erik Molberg Hansen	Beyond	
2011 (47th)	Marius Dybwad Brandrud‡	Play	
2011 (47th)	Per Källberg	Stockholm East	
2011 (47th)	Dan Laustsen	Simon and the Oaks	
2012 (48th)	Hoyte van Hoytema‡	Call Girl	
2012 (48th)	Jan Troell; Mischa Gavrjusjov	The Last Sentence	
2012 (48th)	Måns Månsson	Avalon	
2013 (49th)	Petrus Sjövik‡	Broken Hill Blues	
2013 (49th)	Eric Kress	Waltz for Monica	
2013 (49th)	Erik Sohlström	Shed No Tears	
2014 (50th)	Fredrik Wenzel‡	Force Majeure	
2014 (50th)	Fredrik Wenzel	The Quiet Roar	
2014 (50th)	Jallo Faber	Gentlemen	
2015 (51st)	Gösta Reiland‡	Flocking	
2015 (51st)	Linda Wassberg	White People	
2015 (51st)	Göran Hallberg	A Man Called Ove	
2016 (52nd)	Ita Zbroniec-Zajt‡	The Yard	
2016 (52nd)	Ita Zbroniec-Zajt	My Aunt in Sarajevo	
2016 (52nd)	Anders Bohman	The Garbage Helicopter	
2017 (53rd)	Fredrik Wenzel‡	The Square	
2017 (53rd)	Jonas Alarik	Ravens	
2017 (53rd)	Sophia Olsson	Sami Blood	
2018 (54th)	Kristoffer Jönsson‡	Garden Lane	
2018 (54th)	Ellinor Hallin	In i dimman	
2018 (54th)	Måns Månsson	Jimmie	
2019 (55th)	Lisabi Fridell‡	And Then We Danced	
2019 (55th)	Ragna Jorming	The Perfect Patient	
2019 (55th)	Aril Wretblad	Swoon	
2020 (56th)	Sophia Olsson‡	Charter	
2020 (56th)	Mathias Døcker and Jonathan Elsborg	Meanwhile on Earth	
2020 (56th)	Frida Wendel	Spring Uje spring	
2021 (57th)	Sophie Winqvist Loggins‡	Clara Sola	
2021 (57th)	Ellinor Hallin	Kören – en film om Tensta Gospel Choir	
2021 (57th)	Marek Septimus Wieser	Tigers	

== See also ==
- Academy Award for Best Cinematography
- BAFTA Award for Best Cinematography
