= Orca (2020 film) =

2020 Josephine Bornebusch film

- Directed by: Josephine Bornebusch
- Written by: Josephine Bornebusch; Gunnar AK Järvstad
- Produced by: Sofie Palage
- Starring: Johan Rheborg; Marie Göranzon; Gustav Lindh; Tova Magnusson; Vera Vitali; Erik Johansson; Josephine Bornebusch
- Cinematography: Ragna Jorming
- Edited by: Sarah Patient Nicastro
- Music by: Sophia Ersson
- Production company: Warner Bros.
- Distributed by: Lucky Dogs
- Release date: October 30, 2020
- Running time: 105 minutes
- Country: Sweden
- Language: Swedish

Orca is a 2020 Swedish drama film directed by Josephine Bornebusch who co-wrote the screenplay with Gunnar AK Järvstad. Produced by Sofie Palage, the film stars Johan Rheborg, Marie Göranzon, Gustav Lindh, Tova Magnusson, Vera Vitali, Erik Johansson, and Bornebusch. Written and filmed entirely during the ongoing COVID-19 pandemic, the plot depicts the effects of social distancing on human relationships.

Critics received the film with generally positive reviews, with praise towards its honest portrayal of relationships during the quarantine era. At the 56th Guldbagge Awards, the film received five nominations, including Best Film, Best Screenplay, Best Actor in a Leading Role, and Best Actor in a Supporting Role.

== Plot ==
The plot follows 11 middle-class people in various phases of life, who are isolated from one another. They are compelled to practice social distancing and communicate with each other through video calls.

== Cast ==
- Johan Rheborg as Claes
- Marie Göranzon as Solveig
- Gustav Lindh as Igor
- Tova Magnusson as Sofie
- Vera Vitali as Far
- Erik Johansson as John
- Josephine Bornebusch as Matilda
- Rebecka Josephson as Felicia
- Alba August as Hanna
- Peter Andersson as Allan
- Joel Spira as Ossian
- Rolf Ek as Bosse
- Mika Zetterberg Bornebusch as Lilly
- Alan Adler as Narrator
- Martin Schaub as Young actor

== Development and release ==
Orca focusses on themes of love, relationships, and intimacy, and portrays how isolation can affect relationships. The film derives its title from the scientific name of killer whales. Regarding the choice of the title, Bornebusch stated: "It is also the Latin name for killer whales, one of the most social animals in the world. They get depressed and die if they go astray. I feel that people are like that too. Proximity means more than you think. Giving someone a hug." The production began amidst the ongoing COVID-19 pandemic. Bornebusch and Järvstad finished writing the script in three weeks, however the filming was postponed. It was later completed in 12 days, complying with the social distancing regulations with not more than one actor at a time.

== Reception ==
Contemporary critics praised the film for presenting an honest picture of human relationships during the quarantine era. Aftonbladet writer Emma Grey Munthe gave the film four stars out of five, describing it as "funny, sad, touching" that "swings quickly in between". Film critic Fredrik Sahlin agreed and found the film "fun, believable and engaging consideration of the neurotic middle class fears and shortcomings." Writing for Dagens Nyheter, Jacob Lundström said that the film "describes with a strong presence how relationships build and break down through screens". Hynek Pallas, in his piece for Göteborgs-Posten praised the film as "well-played, elegant, and middle-class emotional drama". Svenska Dagbladet's Jon Asp compared it to Swedish movie Magnolia and felt that the results "although technically well implemented, are more fragmented than condensed".

At the 56th Guldbagge Awards, Orca received five nominations for Best Film, Best Screenplay, Best Actor in a Leading Role, Best Actor in a Supporting Role, and Best Editing.

Awards and nominations
Year	Award	Category	Recipient(s)	Result	Ref.
2020	Guldbagge Awards	Best Actor in a Leading Role	Johan Rheborg	Nominated	
2020	Guldbagge Awards	Best Actor in a Supporting Role	Erik Johansson	Nominated	
2020	Guldbagge Awards	Best Editing	Sarah Patient Nicastro	Nominated	
2020	Guldbagge Awards	Best Film	Orca	Nominated	
2020	Guldbagge Awards	Best Screenplay	Josephine Bornebusch and Gunnar A.K. Järvstad	Nominated	
