= The Garbage Helicopter =

2016 Swedish road movie

- Swedish: Sophelikoptern
- Directed by: Jonas Selberg Augustsén
- Written by: Jonas Selberg Augustsén
- Produced by: Andreas Emanuelsson
- Starring: Christopher Burjanski; Daniel Szoppe; Jessica Szoppe; Singoalla Millon
- Cinematography: Anders Bohman
- Edited by: Nils Moström
- Music by: Jan Sandström
- Production company: Bob Film Sweden AB
- Release date: 27 May 2016 (Sweden)
- Country: Qatar
- Language: Swedish

The Garbage Helicopter (Swedish: Sophelikoptern) is a 2016 Swedish black-and-white road movie written and directed by Jonas Selberg Augustsén. Starring Christopher Burjanski, Daniel Szoppe, Jessica Szoppe, and Singoalla Millon, the film follows three Roma siblings who set out on a road trip across Sweden to deliver an old wall clock to their ailing grandmother.

The film premiered on 27 May 2016.

The film was nominated for four awards at the 52nd Guldbagge Awards and won Best Original Score.

== Plot ==
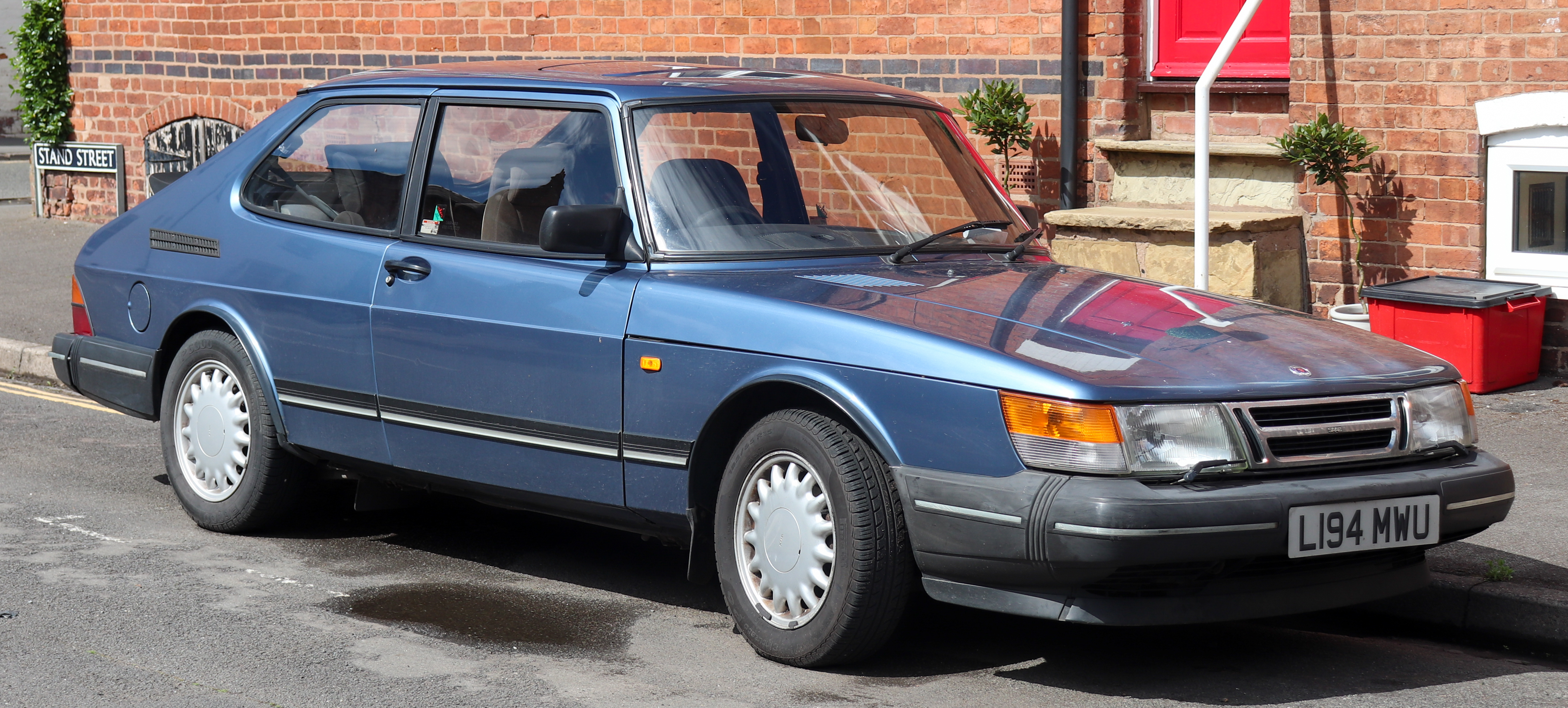
The siblings drive a Saab 900 Turbo.

The film follows three Roma siblings — Baki, Saska, and Enesa — who set out on a road trip across Sweden to deliver an old wall clock to their ailing grandmother.

They stop at the world's largest cheese scoop along the journey.

The siblings are carjacked by a group of masked art thieves fleeing from a heist.

The journey ends when the siblings finally arrive at their grandmother's house and find her lying on the floor with a broken leg.

== Cast ==
- Christopher Burjanski as Baki
- Daniel Szoppe as Saska
- Jessica Szoppe as Enesa
- Singoalla Millon as Sirpa

== Production ==
It was filmed in Harads in Norrbotten County, Sweden.

The film was written and directed by Jonas Selberg Augustsén. Augustsén chose to film in black-and-white to avoid exoticism.

== Release ==
The Garbage Helicopter premiered on 27 May 2016 in Sweden.

== Reception ==
Composer Jan Sandström was nominated for the Guldbagge Award for Best Sound for the music for the film.

In his review for Länstidningen Östersund, Karin Svensson wrote that "the basic plot is simple, but the film is complex".

Jeanette Gentele reviewed the film for Svenska Dagbladet.

=== Accolades ===
List of accolades received by The Garbage Helicopter
| Award | Date of Ceremony | Category | Recipients | Result | Ref. |
|---|---|---|---|---|---|
| 52nd Guldbagge Awards | 23 January 2017 | Guldbagge Award for Best Film | Andreas Emanuelsson | Nominated | |
| 52nd Guldbagge Awards | 23 January 2017 | Guldbagge Award for Best Actress in a Leading Role | Jessica Szoppe | Nominated | |
| 52nd Guldbagge Awards | 23 January 2017 | Guldbagge Award for Best Cinematography | Anders Bohman | Nominated | |
| 52nd Guldbagge Awards | 23 January 2017 | Guldbagge Award for Best Original Score | Jan Sandström | Won | |
