= Run Uje Run =

- Film poster
- Directed by: Henrik Schyffert
- Written by: Uje Brandelius
- Produced by: Anna-Klara Carlsten; Tomas Michaelsson
- Starring: Uje Brandelius
- Cinematography: Frida Wendel
- Edited by: Adi Omanovic
- Music by: Uje Brandelius
- Release date: 26 January 2020 (Göteborg Film Festival)
- Running time: 78 minutes
- Country: Sweden
- Language: Swedish

Run Uje Run (Swedish: Spring Uje spring) is a 2020 Swedish comedy-drama film directed by Henrik Schyffert and written by and starring Uje Brandelius. It won three Guldbagge Awards, including Best Film. The story follows a pop star with Parkinson's disease.

Run Uje Run marks Schyffert's feature film directorial debut. Brandelius' story is autobiographical.

== Cast ==
- Uje Brandelius – Uje
- Bixi Brandelius
- Vega Brandelius
- Therese Hörnqvist
- Irma Schultz – Radio producer

== Release and reception ==
The film premiered at the 2020 Göteborg Film Festival, where it won the FIPRESCI Prize. Sveriges Television's review praised the film as both sad and humorous, and credited Brandelius with a good screenplay. Dagens Nyheter also positively reviewed the film's sad and humorous tone and called it beautiful.

At the 2021 Guldbagge Awards, the film received honours for Best Film and Best Actor and Best Screenplay for Brandelius. It was also nominated for Best Director for Schyffert; Best Cinematography for Frida Wendel; and Best Editing for Adi Omanovic.
