= Guldbagge Award for Best Original Score =

Swedish film award

- Country: Sweden
- Presented by: Swedish Film Institute
- First award: 2011 (for film scores released during the 2011 film season)
- Currently held by: Peter von Poehl, Ravens (2017)
- Website: guldbaggen.se

The Guldbagge for Best Original Score is a Swedish film award presented annually by the Swedish Film Institute (SFI) as part of the Guldbagge Awards (Swedish: "Guldbaggen") to film composers working in the Swedish motion picture industry.

== Winners and nominees ==
Each Guldbagge Awards ceremony is listed chronologically below along with the winner of the Guldbagge Award for Best Original Score and the film associated with the award. In the columns under the winner of each award are the other nominees for best music.

=== 2010s ===
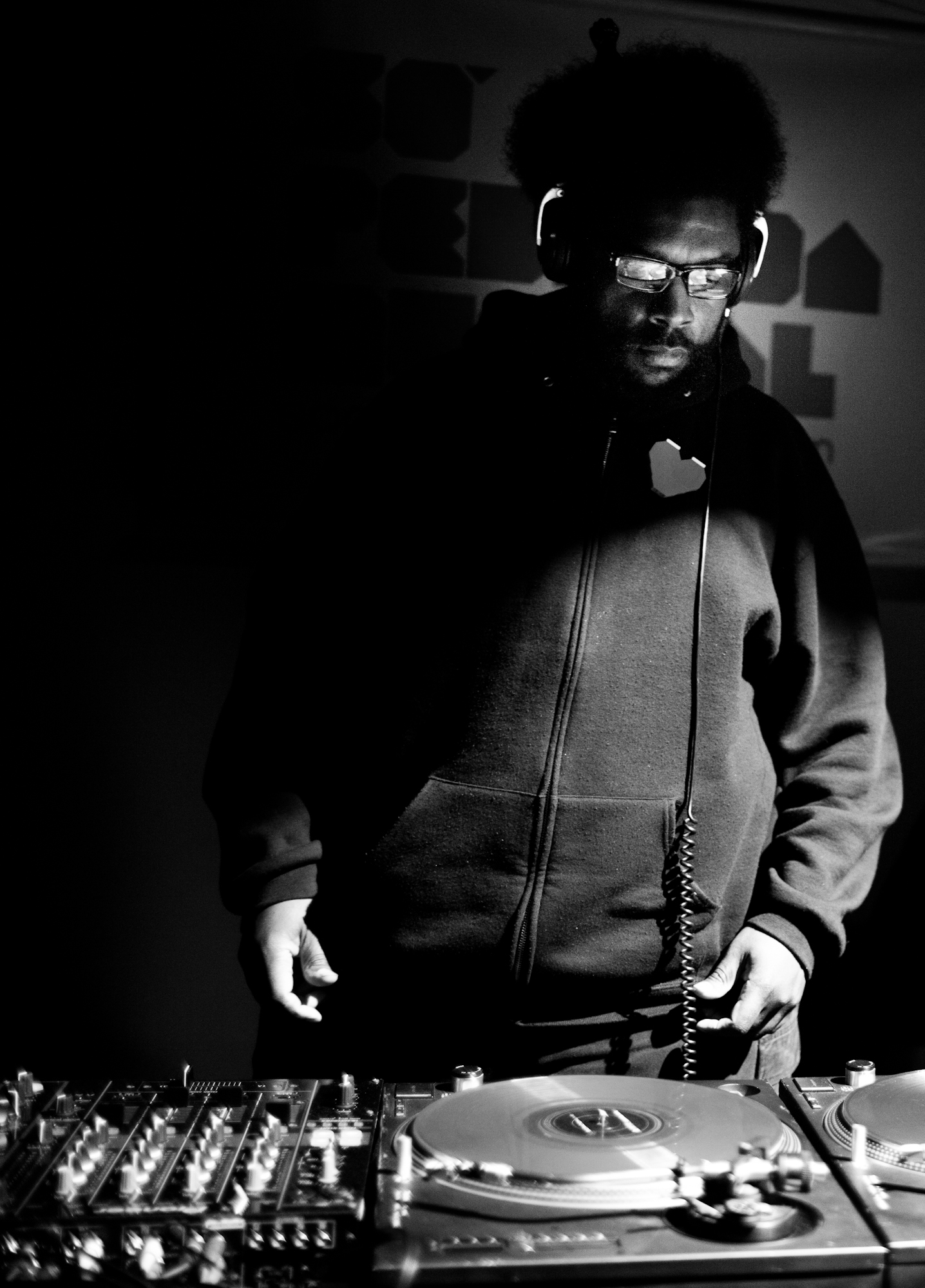
Questlove co-won the award in 2011 for The Black Power Mixtape 1967–1975.

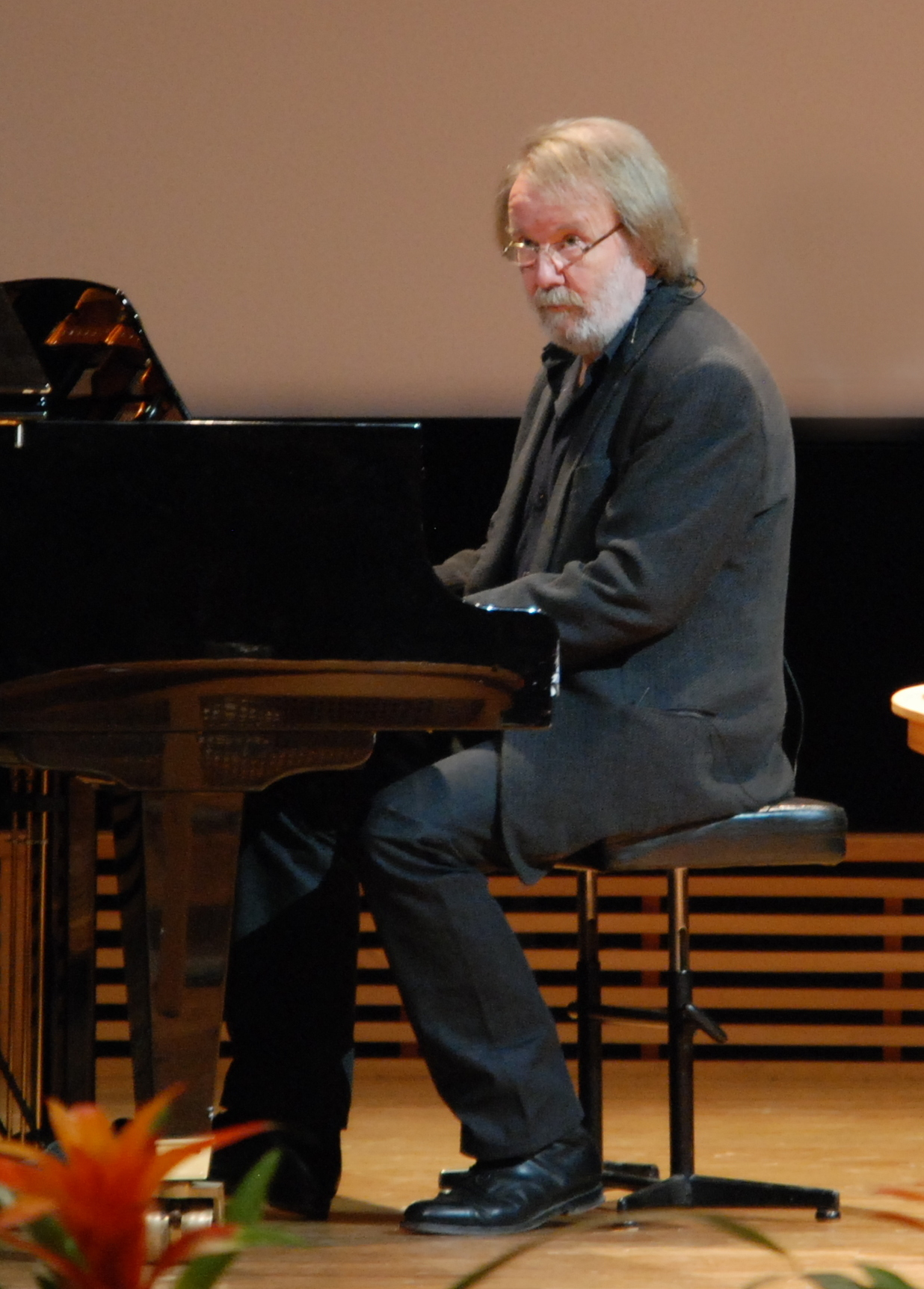
Benny Andersson won the award in 2012 for Palme.

Year	Film	Composer(s)	Ref.
2011 (47th)	The Black Power Mixtape 1967–1975‡	Ahmir "Questlove" Thompson and Om'Mas Keith	
2011 (47th)	Kronjuvelerna	Fredrik Emilson	
2011 (47th)	Simon and the Oaks	Annette Focks	
2012 (48th)	Palme‡	Benny Andersson	
2012 (48th)	Searching for Sugar Man	Malik Bendjelloul and Sixto Rodriguez	
2012 (48th)	El Medico - The Cubaton story	Andreas Unge and Johan Söderqvist	
2013 (49th)	Faro‡	Matti Bye	
2013 (49th)	The Hundred-Year-Old Man Who Climbed Out of the Window and Disappeared	Matti Bye	
2013 (49th)	Waltz for Monica	Peter Nordahl	
2014 (50th)	Gentlemen‡	Mattias Bärjed and Jonas Kullhammar	
2014 (50th)	The Quiet Roar	Erik Enocksson	
2014 (50th)	A Pigeon Sat on a Branch Reflecting on Existence	Hani Jazzar and Gorm Sundberg	
2015 (51st)	Flocking‡	Lisa Holmqvist	
2015 (51st)	The Circle	Benny Andersson	
2015 (51st)	White People	Jon Ekstrand	
2016 (52nd)	The Garbage Helicopter‡	Jan Sandström	
2016 (52nd)	The Giant	Björn Olsson	
2016 (52nd)	Girls Lost	Sophia Ersson	
2017 (53rd)	Ravens‡	Peter von Poehl	
2017 (53rd)	Borg McEnroe	Jonas Struck, Jon Ekstrand and Vladislav Delay	
2017 (53rd)	Citizen Schein	Karl Frid and Pär Frid	
2018 (54th)	Goliath‡	Johan Testad	
2018 (54th)	Halvdan Viking	Gaute Storaas	
2018 (54th)	Innan vintern kommer	Armand Amar	
2019 (55th)	Swoon‡	Nathaniel Méchaly	
2019 (55th)	438 dagar	Jon Ekstrand	
2019 (55th)	Sara med allt sitt väsen	Johan Ramström	

=== 2020s ===
Year	Film	Composer(s)	Ref.
2020 (56th)	Only the Devil Lives Without Hope‡	Ola Kvernberg	
2020 (56th)	Psychosis in Stockholm	Lars Greve	
2020 (56th)	Nelly Rapp Monster Agent	Uno Helmersson	

== See also ==
- List of film music awards § Best score
- Academy Award for Best Original Score
- Saturn Award for Best Music
