= Psychosis in Stockholm =

2020 Maria Bäck film

- Directed by: Maria Bäck
- Written by: Maria Bäck
- Produced by: Anna-Maria Kantarius
- Starring: Josefine Stofkoper; Josefin Neldén; Sanaz Saidi; Maria Bäck; Elisabeth Bäck; Hanna Ullerstam
- Cinematography: Nadim Carlsen
- Edited by: Julius Krebs Damsbo
- Music by: Lars Greve
- Production company: Garagefilm International AB
- Distributed by: Triart Film AB
- Release date: 28 August 2020
- Running time: 100 minutes
- Country: Sweden
- Language: Swedish

Psychosis in Stockholm (Swedish: Psykos i Stockholm) is a 2020 Swedish drama film directed by Maria Bäck who also wrote the screenplay. Produced by Anna-Maria Kantarius, the film stars Josefine Stofkoper, Josefin Neldén, Sanaz Saidi, Maria Bäck, Elisabeth Bäck, and Hanna Ullerstam. Psychosis in Stockholm was screened at the Gothenburg Film Festival on 24 January 2020 and had its official premiere on 26 August that year.

Critics received the film with generally positive reviews, with praise towards its honest portrayal of mother-daughter relationship. At the 56th Guldbagge Awards, the film received five nominations for Best Director, Best Screenplay, Best Actress in a Leading Role for both Neldén and Stofkoper, and Best Original Score.

== Plot ==
The plot follows a mother and daughter who are on their way to Stockholm to celebrate the daughter's 14th birthday. While on train, the mother starts behaving strangely and the daughter fears that her mother might be experiencing another psychosis attack. Despite the signs, they try to enjoy their holiday as planned. When the mother's condition escalates, the daughter is left alone and has to explore Stockholm on her own.

== Cast ==
- Josefine Stofkoper as daughter
- Josefin Neldén as mother
- Sanaz Saidi as Cora
- Maria Bäck as daughter in the future
- Elisabeth Bäck as the mother of the future
- Hanna Ullerstam as guard

== Development and release ==
Psychosis in Stockholm portrays unconditional mother-daughter relationship. Based on Bäck's own personal experiences, the film begins with the voices of Bäck and her mother. In an interview, Bäck revealed that the story was inspired by a particular trip to Stockholm with her mother. She elaborated, "The story in Psychosis in Stockholm has resonated in me since then in the form of an imaginative vision that has felt both pleasurable and necessary to shape. Psychosis in Stockholm was screened as the opening film at the Gothenburg Film Festival on 24 January 2020, and had its official premiere on 28 August that year.

== Reception ==
Contemporary critics praised the film for its honest portrayal of mother-daughter relationship. Nöjesguiden writer Nora Makander praised Psychosis in Stockholm as "one of the best Swedish films produced in a long time", and wrote, "With a sensitive attitude and impressive acting, Psychosis in Stockholm captures, in addition to a life's bottomless journey between normality and madness, the conditions for a beautiful but problematic mother and daughter relationship. Hynek Pallas, in his piece for Göteborgs-Posten praised the performances of the lead actors Josefin Neldén and Josefine Stofkoper, singling out the duo's chemistry as the highlight of the film. Helena Lindblad of Dagens Nyheter agreed and described the chemistry as "strong and convincing throughout the film."

Writing for Aftonbladet, Emma Grey Munthe believed that Psychosis in Stockholm is "the kind of film where the vision is clear, but where you have not really reached the end". Svenska Dagbladet's Karoline Eriksson gave the film a four out of five stars rating and praised the dark climax. Västerbottens-Kuriren also gave the film four stars, and said "what the film lacks in dynamics outweighs its credibility". Karin Svensson from Strömstads Tidning labelled Psychosis in Stockholm as a film where "atmosphere and truth precede sharp film dramaturgy".

At the 56th Guldbagge Awards, Psychosis in Stockholm received five nominations for Best Director, Best Screenplay, Best Actress in a Leading Role for both Neldén and Stofkoper, and Best Original Score. The film was also nominated at the Göteborg Film Festival for Best Nordic Film.

Awards and nominations
Year	Award	Category	Recipient	Result	Ref.
2020	56th Guldbagge Awards	Best Actress in a Leading Role	Josefine Stofkoper	Nominated	
2020	56th Guldbagge Awards	Best Actress in a Leading Role	Josefin Neldén	Nominated	
2020	56th Guldbagge Awards	Best Director	Maria Bäck	Nominated	
2020	56th Guldbagge Awards	Best Original Score	Lars Greve	Nominated	
2020	56th Guldbagge Awards	Best Screenplay	Maria Bäck	Nominated	
2020	Gothenburg Film Festival	Best Nordic Film	Psychosis in Stockholm	Nominated	
