= Josefin Åsberg =

Swedish art director and production designer

- Born: 30 July 1974 (age 51)
- Occupation: Production designer
- Awards: Vulcan Award; European Film Award for Best Production Designer

Josefin Åsberg (born 30 July 1974) is a Swedish film art director and production designer.

In 2013, she was nominated for the Guldbagge Award for Best Art Direction for Waltz for Monica. She worked with Ruben Östlund on the 2014 Force Majeure, where she was tasked with designing sets based on alpine settings. In 2017, she designed the set for Östlund's Palme d'Or-winning film The Square. For the film, she won the Vulcan Award at the 2017 Cannes Film Festival, and the European Film Award for Best Production Designer.

== Filmography ==
Her films include:

- Lilya 4-ever (2002)
- The King of Ping Pong (2008)
- Mammoth (2009)
- Force Majeure (2014)
- The Square (2017)
- Triangle of Sadness (2022)
