= The Real Estate =

2018 film

- Film poster
- Written by: Axel Petersén
- Produced by: Sigrid Helleday; Måns Månsson
- Starring: Léonore Ekstrand
- Cinematography: Måns Månsson
- Release dates: 18 February 2018 (Berlin); 16 March 2018 (Sweden)
- Running time: 88 minutes
- Countries: Sweden; United Kingdom
- Language: Swedish

The Real Estate (Swedish: Toppen av ingenting) is a 2018 Swedish drama film co-directed by Axel Petersén and Måns Månsson. It was selected to compete for the Golden Bear in the main competition section at the 68th Berlin International Film Festival.

== Cast ==
- Léonore Ekstrand as Nojet
- Christer Levin as Lex
- Christian Saldert as Chris
- Olof Rhodin as Mickey
- Carl Johan Merner as Carl Serum
- David Subotic as Businessman
- Don Bennechi as Don
