= David Sundin =

Swedish comedian and writer

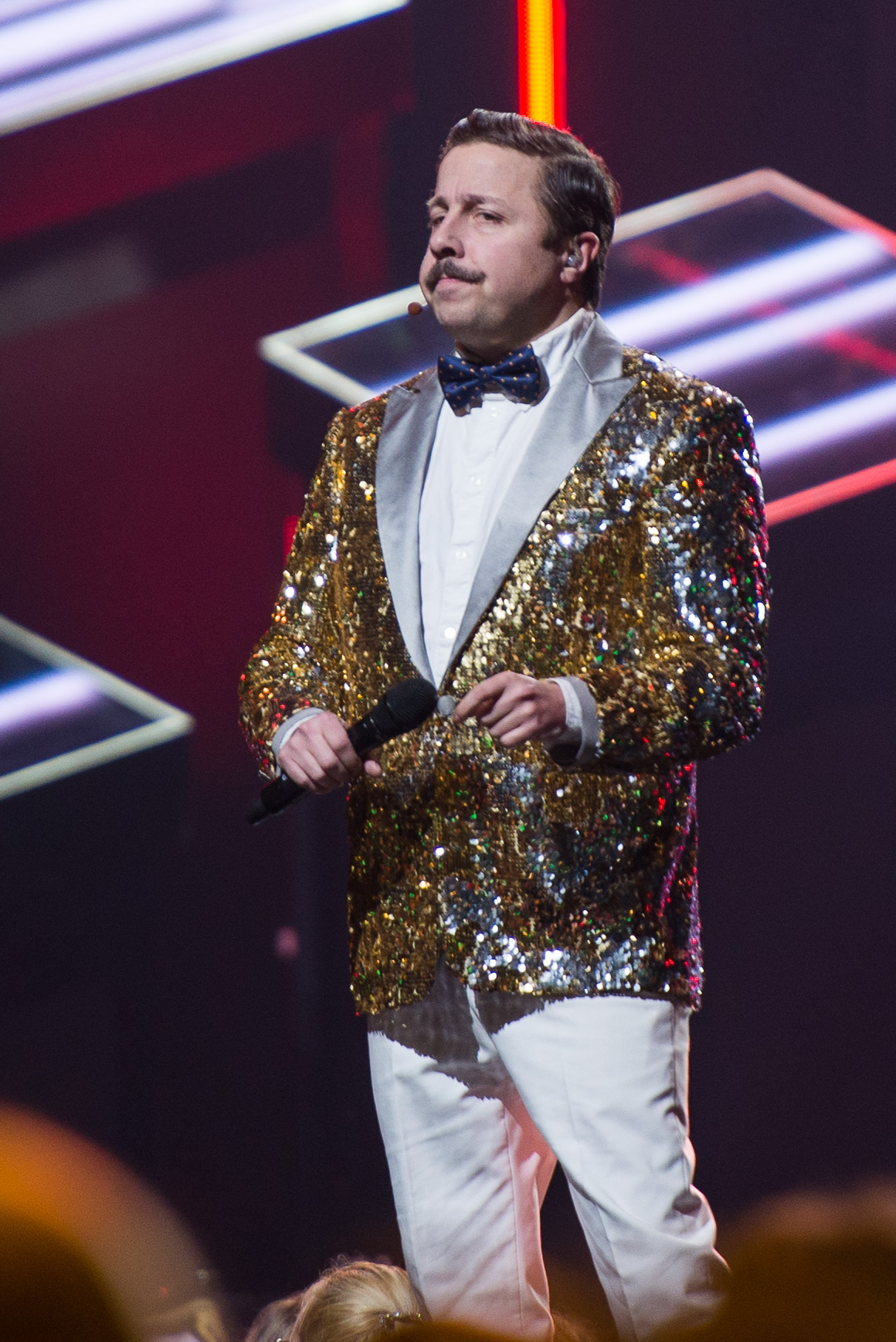
- David Sundin in 2018
- Born: 23 May 1976 (age 49); Väderstad, Sweden
- Occupations: Television presenter; comedian; writer; author; copywriter; actor; producer

David Kai Lennart Sundin (born 23 May 1976) is a Swedish comedian, television presenter and writer.

== Biography ==
Sundin grew up in Gimo in Uppland. He started working within comedy as part of the Killinggänget's website Spermaharen. He also worked along with Alex Schulman and his website 1000 Apor. In 2012, he published the book Fantasinyheter 2001–2012, Henrik Schyffert also wrote a few sections of the book. He has also done some work as a producer for segments for the television shows Sen kväll med Luuk on TV4 and Roast på Berns on Kanal 5, he wrote some of the manuscript for Melodifestivalen and Welcome to Sweden. He has presented the athletics gala Idrottsgalan and the SVT show Bäst i test.

In 2013, he started doing standup and has performed at the clubs RAW, Norra Brunn and Stockholm Comedy Club. In 2015, Sundin was nominated for an Kristallen award for his work in the comedy series Inte OK on TV3.

Sundin plays "Dynamit-Harry" in Tomas Alfredson's film Se upp för Jönssonligan.

On 3 September 2019, Sundin was announced as a presenter of Melodifestivalen 2020 along with Lina Hedlund and Linnea Henriksson. Sundin had a leading role in the 2021 Christmas calendar En hederlig jul med Knyckertz which was broadcast on SVT.

Sundin is the author of The book that did not want to be read, the most sold kids book in Sweden in 2020. The book has been sold to over 25 countries.

== Bibliography ==
- The book that did not want to be read, ISBN 9780241539927
- Fantasinyheter 2001–2012, ISBN 978-91-980273-0-3
- Spermaharen, ISBN 978-91-887481-9-5
- Sveriges bästa ordvitsar, ISBN 978-91-7663-025-9
- Två nötcreme och en Moviebox, ISBN 91-85015-09-1 (Illustrator)
