= Se upp för Jönssonligan =

- Directed by: Tomas Alfredson
- Written by: Henrik Dorsin; Tomas Alfredson
- Based on: Olsen Gang by Erik Balling; Henning Bahs
- Starring: Henrik Dorsin; Anders Johansson; David Sundin; Hedda Stiernstedt
- Distributed by: SF Studios
- Release date: 25 December 2020
- Country: Sweden
- Language: Swedish

Se upp för Jönssonligan is a 2020 Swedish comedy film, directed by Tomas Alfredson. It is the fifteenth installment in the Jönssonligan franchise, and a reboot of the series. As the second reboot of the series, the creative team went back to farce comedy, after the heist thriller comedy in Jönssonligan – Den perfekta stöten failed to live up to the expectations.

== Cast ==
Actor	Role
Henrik Dorsin	Charles-Ingvar Jönsson
Anders "Ankan" Johansson	Ragnar Vanheden
David Sundin	Dynamit Harry
Hedda Stiernstedt	Doris
Reine Brynolfsson	Televinken
Marie Göranzon	Margit Vanheden
Lennart Hjulström	Gösta Vanheden
Lena Olin	Anita
Sven Ahlström	Poppe
MyAnna Buring	Regina Wall
Ville Virtanen	Kantor Veikko Kusela
Pekka Strang	Henrik Adlerstierna

== Production ==
By July 2018, the main three characters were cast with comedians Henrik Dorsin as Charles-Ingvar Jönsson, Anders "Ankan" Johansson as Ragnar Vanheden and David Sundin as Dynamit Harry. That same month a casting call for actors ages 7 to 10 went out for the film.

The filming began in Norrköping in July 2018 and finished in August.

== Release ==
The film was originally set to be released in late 2019, but was moved to 2020.
