= The Crown Jewels (film) =

- Film poster
- Swedish: Kronjuvelarna
- Directed by: Ella Lemhagen
- Written by: Ella Lemhagen; Carina Dahl
- Produced by: Lars Blomgren; Peter Bengtsson; Jessica Ask; Gunnar Carlsson; Tomas Michaelsson; Christian Wikander; Gabija Siurblyte; Lone Korslund
- Starring: Alicia Vikander; Bill Skarsgård; Björn Gustafsson; Loa Falkman; Tomas von Brömsen; Alexandra Rapaport
- Cinematography: Anders Bohman
- Production company: Filmlance
- Release date: 29 June 2011
- Running time: 120 minutes
- Country: Sweden
- Language: Swedish

The Crown Jewels (Swedish: Kronjuvelerna) is a 2011 Swedish drama film directed by Ella Lemhagen based upon a story by Carina Dahl. It stars Alicia Vikander and Bill Skarsgård.

== Plot ==
Fragancia is arrested for the attempted murder of Richard Persson, the son of a powerful factory owner. The story goes through a lot of twists and turns.

== Cast ==
- Alicia Vikander as Fragancia Fernandez
- Bill Skarsgård as Richard Persson
- Loa Falkman as Factory Owner Persson
- Michalis Koutsogiannakis as Fernandez Fernandez
- Jesper Lindberger as Jesus Fernandez
- Alexandra Rapaport as Marianne Fernandez
- Natalie Minnevik as Belinda
- Björn Gustafsson as Pettersson-Jonsson
- Amanda Junegren as Young Fragancia Fernandez
- Jonatan Bökman as Young Richard Persson
- Noah Byström as Young Pettersson-Jonsson
- Michael Segerström as Father Hjalmar
- Timbuktu as Remmy
- Kjell Wilhelmsen as Butcher Jonsson
- Tomas von Brömssen as Commissioner Samnerud
- David Lenneman as Goldie
- Martin Eliasson as Karsten
- Nour El-Refai as Midwife
