= 52nd Guldbagge Awards =

Swedish awards ceremony

- Date: 23 January 2017
- Site: Cirkus, Stockholm
- Hosted by: Petra Mede

Highlights
- Best Picture: The Giant

Television coverage
- Network: SVT
- Duration: 2 hours

The 52nd Guldbagge Awards ceremony, presented by the Swedish Film Institute, honoring the best Swedish films of 2016 and took place on January 23, 2017 at Cirkus in Stockholm. The ceremony was televised by SVT, and comedian Petra Mede hosted the ceremony for the fifth time. She previously hosted the 46th, 47th, 50th, and 51st ceremonies. The nominees were presented on January 4, 2017.

This year, the following categories has been expanded to four nominees: Best Director, Best Screenplay, Best Actress, Best Actor, Supporting Actress and Supporting Actor, while the category of Best Film has been expanded to five. In addition to this changes, the documentary - and short film juries have been combined, and also introduced new rules, which requires the distributors of foreign films to register their films, in order to be eligible for a Guldbagge.

== Winners and nominees ==
The nominees for the 52nd Guldbagge Awards were announced on 4 January 2017 in Stockholm, by the Swedish Film Institute.

=== Awards ===
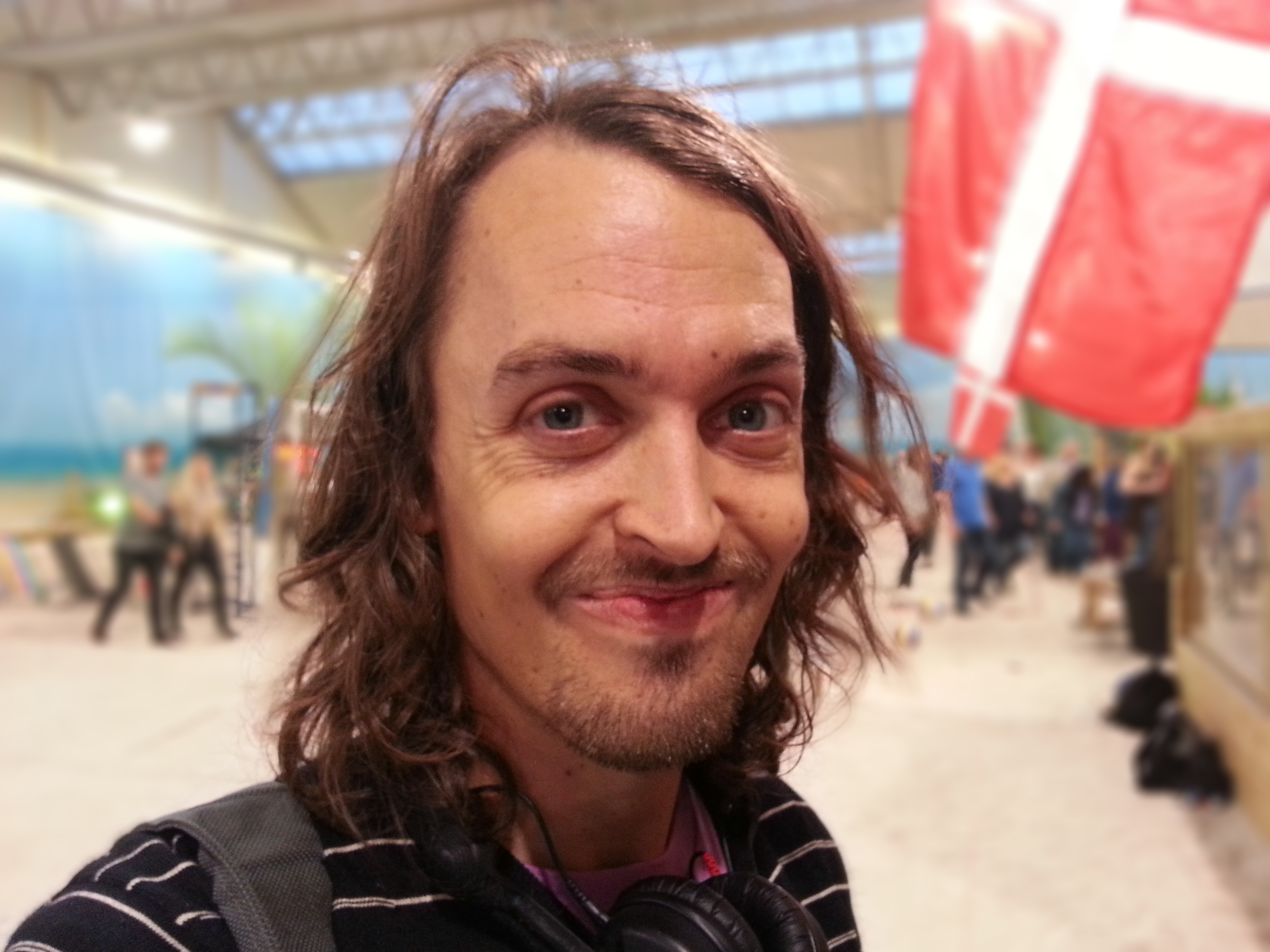
Johannes Nyholm, Best Screenplay winner

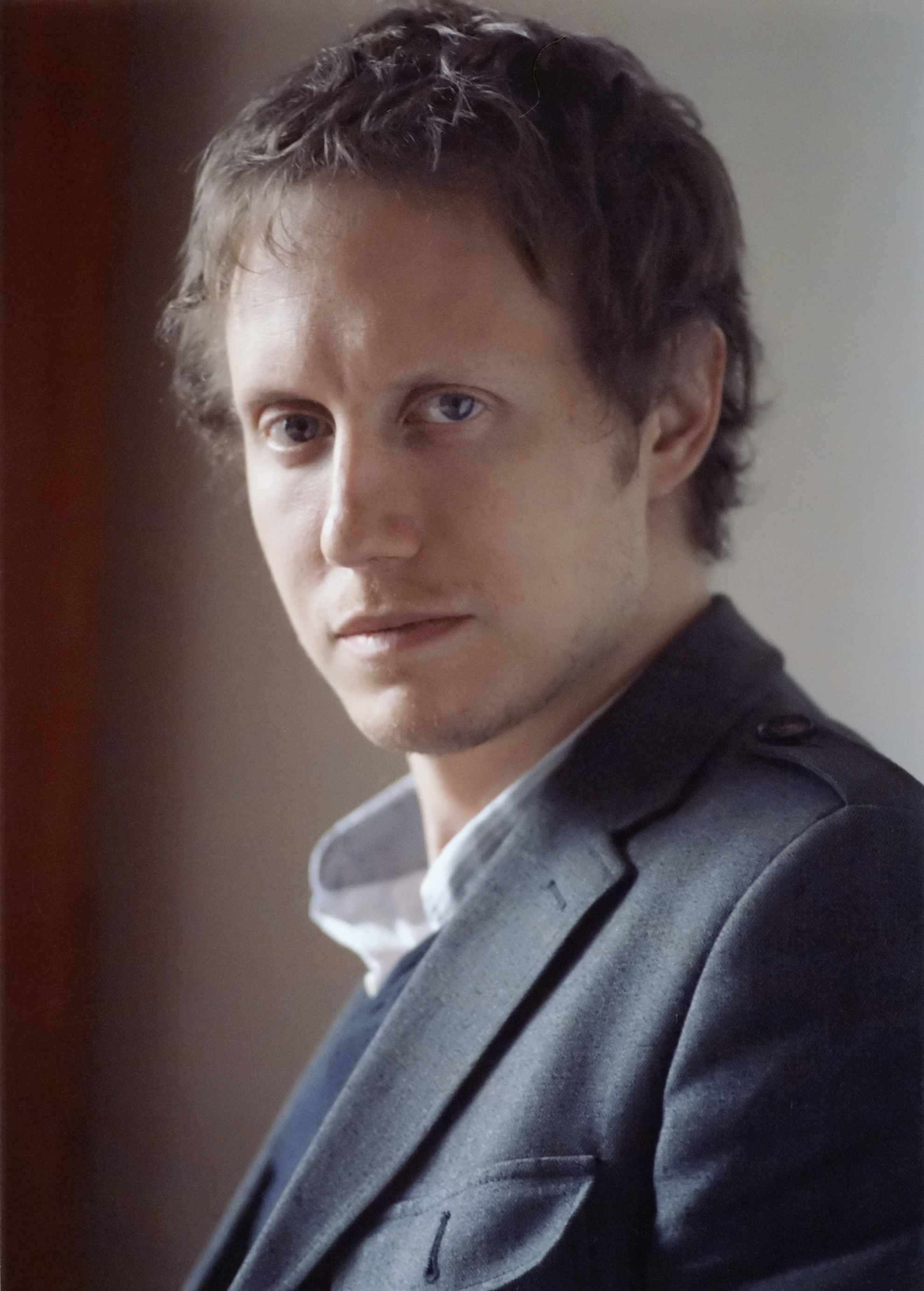
László Nemes, Best Foreign Film winner

Winners are listed first and highlighted in boldface.

**Best Film**: **The Giant – Maria Dahlin and Morten Kjems Hytten Juhl**; The 101-Year Old Man Who Skipped Out on the Bill and Disappeared – Malte Forssell; My Aunt in Sarajevo – China Åhlander; Fragility – David Herdies; The Garbage Helicopter – Andreas Emanuelsson	**Best Director**: **Goran Kapetanović – My Aunt in Sarajevo**; Hanna Sköld – Granny´s Dancing on the Table; Felix and Måns Herngren – The 101-Year Old Man Who Skipped Out on the Bill and Disappeared; Alexandra-Therese Keining – Girls Lost
**Best Actress in a leading role**: **Maria Sundbom – Flickan, mamman och demonerna as Siri**; Karin Franz Körlof – A Serious Game as Lydia Stille; Tuva Jagell – Girls Lost as Kim; Jessica Szoppe – The Garbage Helicopter as Enesa	**Best Actor in a leading role**: **Anders Mossling – The Yard as 11811**; Jonathan Silén – The Modern Project as Simon; Lennart Jähkel – Granny´s Dancing on the Table as The Father; Milan Dragišić – My Aunt in Sarajevo as Zlatan
**Best Supporting Actress**: **Sadžida Šetić – My Aunt in Sarajevo as Radmila**; Liv Mjönes – A Serious Game as Dagmar Randel; Ia Langhammer – Flykten till framtiden as Mother; Svetlana Rodina Ljungkvist – The 101-Year Old Man Who Skipped Out on the Bill and Disappeared as Kristina	**Best Supporting Actor**: **Michael Nyqvist – A Serious Game as Markel**; Henrik Dorsin – Flykten till framtiden as Bengan; Iwar Wiklander – The 101-Year Old Man Who Skipped Out on the Bill and Disappeared as Julius; Johan Kylén – The Giant as Roland
**Best Screenplay**: **Johannes Nyholm – The Giant**; Jan Vierth and Anders Sparring – Bajsfilmen – Dolores och Gunellens värld; China Åhlander, Dragan Mitić and Goran Kapetanović – My Aunt in Sarajevo; Sara Nameth – The Yard	**Best Cinematography**: **The Yard – Ita Zbroniec-Zajt**; My Aunt in Sarajevo – Ita Zbroniec-Zajt; The Garbage Helicopter – Anders Bohman
**Best Editing**: **Martha & Niki – Therese Elfström and Tora Mkandawire Mårtens**; The 101-Year Old Man Who Skipped Out on the Bill and Disappeared – Henrik Källberg; The Giant – Johannes Nyholm and Morten Højbjerg	**Best Costume Design**: **A Serious Game – Kicki Ilander**; Flykten till framtiden – Jaana Fomin; Upp i det blå – Moa Li Lemhagen Schalin
**Best Sound Editing**: **The Yard – Patrik Strömdahl**; Ester Blenda – Jan Alvermark; Golden Girl – Peter Adolfsson and Henric Andersson	**Makeup and Hair**: **The Giant – Eva von Bahr, Love Larson and Pia Aleborg**; Flykten till framtiden – Anna-Carin Lock; The 101-Year Old Man Who Skipped Out on the Bill and Disappeared – Eva von Bahr and Love Larson
**Best Original Score**: **The Garbage Helicopter – Jan Sandström**; The Giant – Björn Olsson; Girls Lost – Sophia Ersson	**Best Art Direction**: **Flykten till framtiden – Liv Ask and Bengt Fröderberg**; A Serious Game – Anna Asp; The 101-Year Old Man Who Skipped Out on the Bill and Disappeared – Mikael Varhelyi
**Best Documentary Feature**: **Martha & Niki – Tora Mkandawire Mårtens**; Don Juan – Jerzy Sladkowski; MonaLisa Story – Jessica Nettelbladt	**Best Shortfilm**: **6A – Peter Modestij**; Baby – Lovisa Sirén; Kroppen är en ensam plats – Ida Lindgren
**Best Foreign Film**: **(Hungary) Son of Saul – László Nemes**; (Germany) (Austria) Toni Erdmann – Maren Ade; (France) Mustang – Deniz Gamze Ergüven	**Best Visual Effects**: **The 101-Year Old Man Who Skipped Out on the Bill and Disappeared – Fredrik Nord**; Siv sover vilse – Henrik Klein and Petter Lindblad; Upp i det blå – Tomas Näslund
**Gullspiran**: **Petter Lennstrand**	**Honorary Award**: **Katinka Faragó**
**Newcomer Award**: **Ahang Bashi**	**Cinema Audience Award**: **The 101-Year Old Man Who Skipped Out on the Bill and Disappeared**; Bamse And The Witch's Daughter; Morran & Tobias - Som en skänk från ovan

== Presenters ==
The following individuals are confirmed to present awards at the ceremony.

- Alice Bah Kuhnke
- Bea Szenfeld
- Bianca Kronlöf
- Björn Kjellman
- Börje Ahlstedt
- Can Demirtas
- Christian Svensson
- Christina Schollin
- Claes Ljungmark
- Clara Henry and Thomas Sekelius
- Erik Hassle
- Ester Vuori and Leo Hellenius
- Dragomir Mrsic
- Gert Wingårdhs
- Haddy Jallow
- Hanna Alström
- Jason Diakité
- Josefin Asplund
- Lena Endre
- Malin Levanon
- Maria Kulle
- Maxida Märak
- Michael Segerström
- Roy Fares
- Sofia Ledarp
- Steve Angello

== See also ==
- 89th Academy Awards
- 74th Golden Globe Awards
- 70th British Academy Film Awards
- 23rd Screen Actors Guild Awards
- 22nd Critics' Choice Awards
- 21st Satellite Awards
- 37th Golden Raspberry Awards
