= Bamse and the Witch's Daughter =

- Poster
- Swedish: Bamse och häxans dotter
- Directed by: Christian Ryltenius; Maria Blom
- Screenplay by: Ida Kjellin; Sofie Forsman
- Based on: Bamse by Rune Andréasson
- Produced by: Jon Nohrstedt
- Narrated by: Tomas Bolme
- Music by: Henrik Lörstad
- Production companies: SF Studios; Tre Vänner
- Distributed by: Nordisk Film
- Release date: 25 December 2016
- Running time: 65 minutes
- Countries: Sweden; Hungary; Germany; Taiwan
- Language: Swedish
- Box office: $431,132

Bamse and the Witch's Daughter (Swedish: Bamse och häxans dotter) is a 2016 Swedish-language animated film directed by Christian Ryltenius and Maria Blom from a screenplay by Ida Kjellin and Sofie Forsman, based on the Bamse cartoon franchise by Rune Andréasson. A sequel to Bamse and the City of Thieves (2014), it is the second film in the Bamse film series, and was followed by Bamse and the Thunder Clock (2018). An international co-production between Sweden, Hungary, Germany and Taiwan, the film was produced by SF Studios and Tre Vänner, and distributed by Nordisk Film. It was released on 25 December 2016, and received generally positive reviews from critics, who praised for its animation, character development and anti-capitalist messages, but criticised its screenplay.

== Cast ==
- Peter Haber as Bamse
- Steve Kratz as Skalman
- Morgan Alling as Little Shot
- Jonas Karlsson as Krösus Sork
- Ingela Olsson as Hatiora the Witch
- Laura Jonstoij Berg as Lova
- Tea Stjärne as Nalle-Maja
- Malin Cederbladh as Hugg
- Christer Fant as Tagg
- Shebly Niavarani as the Wolf
- Leif Andrée as Knocke and Smocke
- Ia Langhammer as the Grandmother
- Maria Bolme as Brummelisa
- Karin Gidfors as Miss Fiffi
- Andreas Rothlin Svensson as Tough Sork
- Emma Peters as Tessan Sork
