= Niavarani =

Niavarani (Persian: نیاورانی) is a Persian surname. Notable people with the surname include:

- Michael Niavarani (born 1968), Austrian comedian
- Shebly Niavarani (born 1979), Persian-Swedish actor
- Shima Niavarani (born 1985), Persian-Swedish singer
