= Pellefant =

Swedish comic book character

- Pellefant

Publication information
- First appearance: 1954
- Created by: Rune Andréasson

In-story information
- Alter ego
- Species: elephant
- Place of origin: Earth

Pellefant is a Swedish comic book character, a blue living toy elephant. He was created by Rune Andréasson.

Pellefant's first appearance was in Andréasson's book Pellefant i Gottlandet ("Pellefant in Candyland" or "Pellefant in Tastyland"), which was written in the 1940s, but first published in 1954. Pellefant got his own comic book series from 1965 to 1993, although Andréasson very early left both illustration and scriptwriting over to others, first to Gösta Gummesson and the Dane Gil Johansen, and also Georges Bess during his stay in Sweden.

Pellefant has appeared in Finland in the 1980s and 1990s in his own comic book series, and also for a short time in the Bamse comic book. Pellefant was published in India in the early Eighties, translated to English as 'Appu the Pellephant'. The series was short-lived.

== Characters ==
Pellefant
A small blue elephant, headstrong and priggish, somewhat like Karlsson-on-the-Roof. His way of often acting first and thinking later often leads Pellefant into difficult situations, which he always fails to realise, because he views himself as the best in the world. But his loud, trumpeting voice often helps him deal with the difficult situations.
Pip
A small mouse who is Pellefant's best friend and often saves him from difficult situations, like Jiminy Cricket.
Filur
Originally a small and evil wizard who often failed in his magic. After Gil Johansen took over scriptwriting, Filur became nicer and nicer, eventually becoming a bickering friend of Pellefant and Pip, or occasionally even a genuine friend.
The liquorice troll (Lakritstrollet)
A large and slow-witted figure with black fur, who often causes mischief. He is Filur's companion but is often heavily exploited by him.
Other toys
Pellefant and Pip live in a house together with a handful of other toy figures, including a cowboy doll, an Indian doll, a girl doll and a toy dog, among others.
