= Tom Ljungman =

Swedish actor (born 1991)

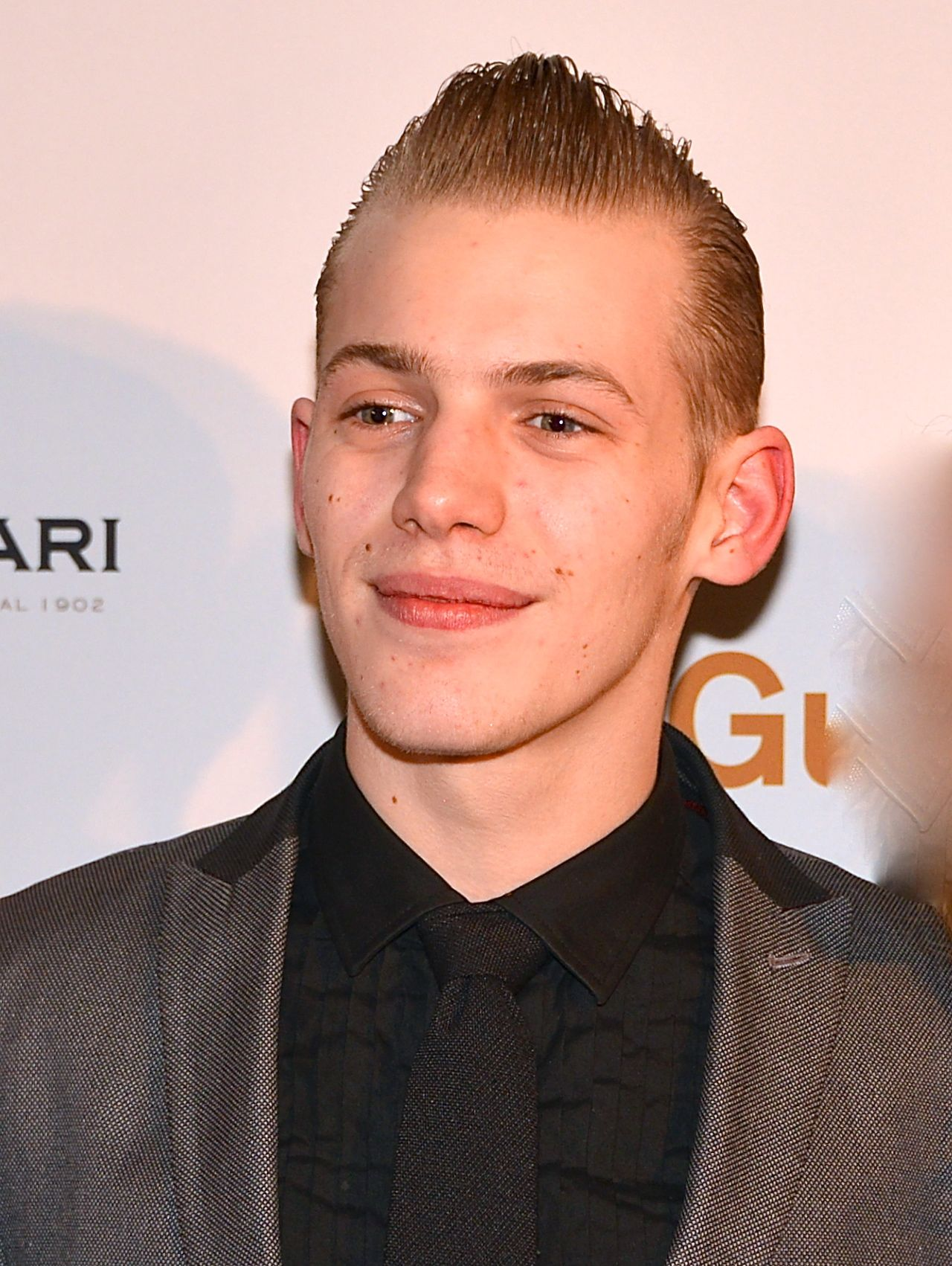
- Tom Ljungman in 2013.
- Born: Thomas Kjell Ljungman; 29 May 1991 (age 35); Stockholm, Sweden
- Years active: 2003-present

Tom Ljungman (born 29 May 1991) is a Swedish television and film actor.

== Early life ==
Born Thomas Kjell Ljungman in Stockholm, Sweden on 29 May 1991. He is the son of TV 3 personality Jonny Ljungman and lives in Skarpnäck borough in south Stockholm.

== Career ==
His first acting role was in Errol in 2003. He is best known for his roles in television series De halvt dolda and as Foppa in Livet enligt Rosa. Ljungman appeared as a 16-year-old dead shot on a mission in the 2009 Wallander episode The Sniper.

On the big screen, he is best known for his role as Patrik, a 15-year-old troubled adolescent in the 2008 Swedish gay comedy film Patrik, Age 1.5, directed by Ella Lemhagen.

== Filmography ==
=== Films ===
- 2012 - Johan Falk Barninfiltratören as Ricky
- 2012 - Jävla pojkar as Kristoffer
- 2011 = Kronjuvelerna as Jésus Fernandez (voice)
- 2011 - With Every Heartbeat (Swedish: Kyss mig) as Oskar
- 2011 - Jag saknar dig as Stefan
- 2008 - Patrik, Age 1.5 (Swedish: Patrik 1,5) as Patrik
- 2010 - 7X - lika barn leka bäst as Morgan
- 2008 - Let the Right One In (Swedish: Låt den rätte komma in)

=== Television ===
- 2019 - Gåsmamman as Janusz Thuchlin
- 2019 - Innan vi dör as Fevsi
- 2019 - Dröm as Vuxna Hjalmar
- 2016 - Juicebaren
- 2014 - Viva Hate as Daniel
- 2013 - Fjällbackamorden: Strandridaren as Ante
- 2012 - Jägaren as Jonas
- 2011 - Maria Wern as Tom
- 2009 - Wallander as Skytten (The Sniper)
- 2009 - De halvt dolda as Linus
- 2009 - Fallet - del 2 (Skotten i Rödeby) as Micke
- 2008 - Oskyldigt dömd as Oskar Karlsson
- 2005 - Livet enligt Rosa as Foppa
- 2005 - Länge leve Lennart as Tommy
- 2004 - Pappa Jansson as Arvid
- 2003 - Errol as Errol
