= Amanda Davin =

Swedish actress

Amanda Klara Alexandra Davin (born 12 April 1992) is a Swedish actress.

== Filmography ==
=== Film ===
- Tur & retur (2003)
- Allt om min buske (2007)
- Wallander (2007)
- Patrik, Age 1.5 (2008)
- Allt flyter (2008)
- Som en Zorro (2012)
