= Bamse and the City of Thieves =

2014 film

- Directed by: Christian Ryltenius
- Distributed by: Nordisk Film
- Release date: January 17, 2014
- Running time: 66 minutes
- Country: Sweden
- Language: Swedish

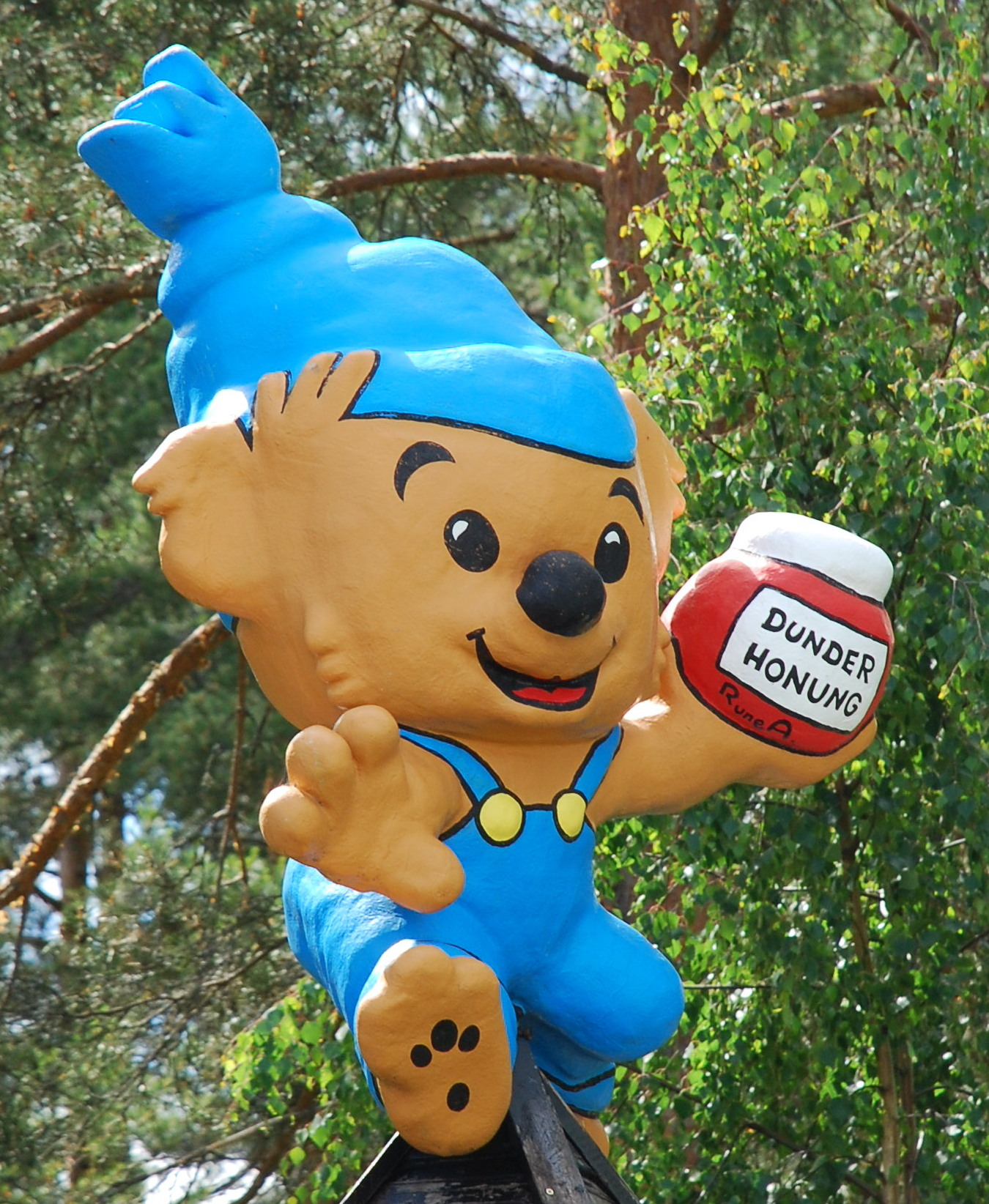

Bamse and the City of Thieves (Swedish: Bamse och Tjuvstaden) is a 2014 animated feature film featuring Bamse.

== Voice cast ==
- Tomas Bolme - Narrator
- Peter Haber - Bamse
- Morgan Alling - Lille Skutt
- Steve Kratz - Skalman
- Magnus Härenstam - Reinard Räv
- Maria Langhammer - Farmor
- Shebly Niavarani - Vargen
- Tea Stjärne - Nalle-Maja
- Leif Andrée - Knocke and Smocke
- Maria Bolme - Brummelisa
- Tomas Tivemark - Buster Pirat
- Edith Enberg-Salibli - Katta-Lo
- Karin Gidfors - Fröken Fiffi
- Susanne Kujala - Farliga Flisan Sork
- Nicklas Lindh - Ola Grävling, Konstapel Kask, Troll
- Rolf Lydahl - Kubbe Vargkusin
- Kim Sulocki - Lilla vargkusinen
- Martin Mighetto - Busifer/conductor/troll
- Jens Johansson - Slaske Sork/stollen
- Jonas Jansson - Husmusen/Katten Jansson
