= Stockholm East =

Stockholm East, or Stockholm Östra, may refer to:

- Stockholms östra railway station, a railway terminus in Stockholm, Sweden
- Stockholm East (film), a film set in Stockholms östra railway station and starring Mikael Persbrandt and Iben Hjejle
