= Tur & retur =

- Directed by: Ella Lemhagen
- Screenplay by: Ella Lemhagen
- Produced by: Tomas Michaelsson; Charlotta Denward
- Music by: John Erik Kaada
- Distributed by: Filmlance International; Nordisk Film
- Release date: 2003
- Running time: 84 minutes
- Country: Sweden
- Language: Swedish

Tur & retur ("Round-trip") is a 2003 Swedish comedy film, directed and written by Ella Lemhagen.

== Plot ==
It is Friday afternoon and children all over the country with divorced parents are packing their bags to spend the weekend with their other family. Among them are Martin (aged 11) who is going to his father Torkel on the border with Norway, and Julia (also aged 11) who is going to her mother Kicki in Malmö, but they don't want to go. At the airport they meet each other, and notice that they look very alike, so they change destinations and go to each other's families. The journey will change their lives.

== Selected cast ==
- Amanda Davin as Julia/Martin
- Helena af Sandeberg as Kicki
- Jørgen Langhelle as Torkel
- Torkel Petersson as Peter, Kicki's boyfriend
- Julia Ragnarsson as My
- Inga Landgré as Greta
- Leonard Goldberg as Joakim
- Maria Langhammer as Marianne
- Henny Moan as Martin's grandmother
- Bjørn Floberg as Uncle Sverker
- Mattias Silvell as Anders
- Ville Bergman as Jonatan
- Sarah Lindh as Aunt Bodil
- Robert Wells
- Mia Poppe as Linda
- Alexandra Zetterberg as Rose
- Åsa Johanisson as Stewardess
