= Viking Wolf =

- Directed by: Stig Svendsen
- Screenplay by: Espen Aukan; Stig Svendsen
- Produced by: Ellen Alveberg; John M. Jacobsen
- Starring: Liv Mjönes; Elli Rhiannon Müller Osborne; Arthur Hakalahti; Sjur Vatne Brean
- Cinematography: Trond Tønder
- Edited by: Elise Olavsen
- Music by: Bjørnar Johnsen; Kjetil Schander Luhr
- Production companies: Filmkamatere A/S; REinvent Studios
- Distributed by: Netflix Streaming Services
- Release date: November 18, 2022 (Locarno)
- Running time: 97 minutes
- Country: Norway
- Language: Norwegian
- Box office: $57,727

Viking Wolf (Norwegian: Vikingulven) is a 2022 Norwegian horror/thriller film directed by Stig Svendsen, written by Espen Aukan and Stig Svendsen, and starring Liv Mjönes, Elli Rhiannon Müller Osborne, Arthur Hakalahti and Sjur Vatne Brean. It tells the story of a 17-year-old girl who gets bitten by a werewolf and slowly transforms into one as her police officer mother, occupied by the werewolf's other activities, is unaware of her daughter's condition. The movie was primarily filmed in Notodden Municipality, Norway.

== Plot ==
Seventeen-year-old Thale Berg lives with her mother Liv, her step-father and little sister Jenny, who is deaf and to whom Thale is especially close, in a town where her mother is a police officer.

She attends a night-time outdoor party when a girl at the edge of the party is attacked in the dark. Thale attempts to help but the attacker slices her shoulder and drags its prey into the woods. The missing girl's mutilated body is found and the coroner concludes that a large animal attacked her.

Lars Brodin arrives and claims that the beast is a werewolf. Liv dismisses him. Lars gives her a silver bullet, insisting it is the only way to kill them. William Nordvaag, a veterinary expert, concludes that the girl's killer could be an unusually large wolf. The mayor calls on Liv and police chief Eilert Sundas to lead a hunting party to kill it.

The beast attacks the hunting party, seriously wounding Eilert. It lunges at Liv and she breaks her wrist. She empties her gun into the wolf with no effect. It dies after she fires the silver bullet. At the hospital Eilert is comatose and a cast is placed on Liv’s wrist.That night, Thale begins to have strange experiences and her senses also seem to sharpen.

Jenny finds Thale sleepwalking outside, soothes her and brings her into the house. Thale mentions to Jenny that it feels like she hasn't slept in days.

William tells Liv that her lead bullets hit the wolf's heart and lungs but the silver bullet caused its only fatal injury, leading Liv to think it was a werewolf. This discovery prompts Liv to seek out Lars. He tells her that a werewolf loses all humanity and craves human blood.

Jonas invites Thale to join him outside and his father phones him. While Jonas is distracted the full moon transforms Thale into semi-wolf form with predatory instincts and she kills him.

The coroner concludes that his injuries resemble Elin’s albeit from a smaller animal. Thale realising her crime, decides to leave town on a night bus. Lars goes to the hospital, finds Eilert infected by the beast, shuts down Eilert’s life support and leaves.

On board the bus, the full moon transforms Thale into a werewolf. She attacks the other passengers and the bus crashes. Liv is first on the scene and survivors tell her a wolf attacked them. It left before Liv arrived but she finds her daughter's torn clothes and jewellery. William appears and tells Liv that the dead wolf’s DNA was partly human. Liv concludes her daughter has become a werewolf.

Thale returns home as a werewolf and lunges at Jenny. However, the two recognize each other and Thale hesitates. Their step-father stumbles into the scene and fights Thale off with a lamp before getting into his van with Jenny and racing to the town center with Thale in pursuit. Badly injured, Arthur crashes the van near a crowded pub. The crowd approaches to help just as Thale appears.

Thale goes on a murder spree. Jenny catches up and signs to Thale that she'll look after her as Liv and William arrive. He shoots Thale with a tranquilizer dart. Liv grabs Jenny and the three run into a store. As they struggle to keep Thale out Lars arrives in his RV, careening through the storefront in an attempt to hit her. All the adults are injured and an unharmed Thale enters the store, killing Lars and attacking Liv. Liv fends her off with the cast and orders the injured William to shoot Thale with another tranquilizer dart. Seeing William incapacitated, Jenny stabs the dart into Thale's side, ending the attack.

While Thale is sedated in a vet clinic, Liv loads a silver bullet into her gun. Her composure breaks and she looks away as she places the mouth of the barrel against Thale's furred neck. Later she arrives home and places the silver bullet next to a photo of Thale on her nightstand leaving it ambiguous if she killed her or released her body far from civilization.

== Cast ==
- Liv Mjönes as Liv Berg
- Elli Rhiannon Müller Osborne as Thale Berg
- Arthur Hakalahti as William Nordvaag, veterinarian
- Vidar Magnussen as Arthur Berg
- Mia Fosshaug Laubacher as Jenny Berg
- Sjur Vatne Brean as Jonas Larson
- Ståle Bjørnhaug as Lars Brodin
- Øyvind Brandtzæg as Eilert Sundas
- Silje Øksland Krohne as Elin Gran
- Anna Drowak as Tove Gran
- Kasper Antonsen as Vidar Uthaug
- Ívar Örn Sverrisson as Olav
- Sverre Breivik as Torgersen
- Jon Stensby as Harald
- Pål Anders Nordvi as Journalist (uncredited)

== Reception ==
The film received mixed reviews, scoring 50% on Rotten Tomatoes based on 6 reviews. It took $57,727 at the box office and was released on Netflix on 3 February 2023.
