= Girls Lost =

2015 film

- Film poster
- Directed by: Alexandra-Therese Keining
- Written by: Alexandra-Therese Keining; Jessica Schiefauer (novel)
- Starring: Tuva Jagell; Emrik Öhlander; Louise Nyvall; Alexander Gustavsson; Josefin Neldén
- Release dates: 12 September 2015 (TIFF); 19 February 2016 (Sweden)
- Country: Sweden
- Language: Swedish

Girls Lost (Swedish: Pojkarna) is a 2015 Swedish drama film directed by Alexandra-Therese Keining. It's based on the August Prize-winning novel Pojkarna (literary The Boys) by Jessica Schiefauer. It was screened in the Contemporary World Cinema section of the 2015 Toronto International Film Festival. The film draws on elements of magical realism to explore notions of fluid sexuality and identity.

== Plot ==
Best friends Kim, Momo and Bella are sexually harassed, bullied and assaulted by boys at school while their teachers do nothing. When they discover a flower whose nectar can temporally turn them into boys, they venture out after dark to test the transformation. Where Bella and Momo are more bewildered and tentative, Kim is elated by the newfound freedom of her male persona.

While at a party hosted by Tony, Bella chokes when taking a hit from a joint. When the boys start laughing, Kim joins in. Momo, angry at Kim's behavior, takes Bella home. The next day, Kim tells Momo she feels like there is a zipper down her back and another person inside her, if she only had the courage to pull.

On a positive note, their experiences as boys give Momo and Kim the confidence to confront their bullies and negligent teacher.

Even though the flower begins to die, Kim continues to take its nectar so she can become a boy and spend time with Tony, a troubled teen and petty thief. The night Tony teaches Kim how to drive, he pulls a gun out of the glove compartment and tells her the best way to commit suicide.

Momo asks Kim if she is in love with Tony or if she wants to be him, and Kim admits that she's drawn to Tony because "he doesn't know who he is either". Momo tells Kim she's in love with her, and asks if Kim wants to be a boy, or be with boys. Kim doesn't answer.

One night, Tony and Kim's relationship implodes when Kim attempts to kiss Tony. Tony responds by punching Kim, throwing lighter fluid on her and threatening to set her on fire. She runs away only to be met by Momo, in her male persona. Momo says that she understands what Kim meant by the zipper, but that it was different for her and Bella. They wanted to be girls. Even so, Momo offers to stay in her male persona for Kim. Rather than respond, Kim flees with Momo following.

Kim arrives at a warehouse where Tony and other local young people go to party. Kim finds Tony attempting to rape a girl on a dirty mattress. Kim tells Tony to stop, and when he doesn't, Kim kicks Tony until Momo intercedes. When Kim refuses to stop taking the nectar, and rebuffs Momo's love overtures again, Momo burns down the greenhouse and the flower.

Kim, devastated, packs a bag, leaves a note for her mom, tapes another to Momo's window, then visits Bella to apologize and say goodbye. Bella gives her the ravaged roots of the plant. Kim drives out of the city and is last seen parked on a rural road, crying and contemplating with a gun in her hand.

== Cast ==
- Tuva Jagell as Kim
  - Emrik Öhlander as boy Kim
- Louise Nyvall as Momo
  - Alexander Gustavsson as boy Momo
- Wilma Holmén as Bella
  - Vilgot Ostwald as boy Bella
- Mandus Berg as Tony
- Josefin Neldén as Gym Teacher
- Lars Väringer as Sten
- Olle Wirenhed as Bella's father
- Simon Settergren as Cashier

== Reception ==
The film was nominated for three awards at the 52nd Guldbagge Awards. Tuva Jagell (in her debut role) was nominated for Best Actress in a Leading Role while Sophia Ersson was nominated for Best Original Score and Alexandra-Therese Keining for Best Director. The film received the award for best screenplay at the 2015 Antalya Golden Orange Film Festival and won the prize for best children's film at the 2016 CPH PIX.
