= With Every Heartbeat (film) =

2011 film by Alexandra-Therese Keining

- Original title: Kyss mig
- Directed by: Alexandra-Therese Keining
- Screenplay by: Alexandra-Therese Keining
- Based on: A story by Josefine Tengblad and Alexandra-Therese Keining
- Produced by: Josefin Tengblad
- Starring: Ruth Vega Fernandez; Liv Mjönes; Krister Henriksson; Lena Endre; Joakim Nätterqvist; Tom Ljungman; Josefin Tengblad
- Cinematography: Ragna Jorming
- Edited by: Lars Gustafson; Malin Lindström
- Music by: Marc Collin
- Production company: Lebox Produktion AB
- Distributed by: Nordisk Film (Scandinavia); Wolfe (United States, Canada); TLA (United Kingdom, Ireland)
- Release date: 29 July 2011 (Sweden)
- Running time: 103 minutes
- Country: Sweden
- Language: Swedish
- Box office: $396,596

With Every Heartbeat (Swedish: Kyss mig), also released as Kiss Me, is a 2011 Swedish drama film directed and written by Alexandra-Therese Keining. The film won the "Breakthrough Award" at the 2011 AFI Festival.

== Synopsis ==
Mia announces her engagement to her boyfriend Tim at her father's 60th birthday party. At the same party, her father Lasse proposes to his live-in girlfriend Elizabeth.

When Mia meets Elizabeth's fun-loving daughter Frida, she is initially wary of being accepted into Elizabeth's family. Reluctantly, Mia agrees to a weekend getaway on the island of Fyn with Frida and Elizabeth. Forced to share a bedroom with Frida, Mia finds herself fascinated by the other woman's free-spiritedness. While out walking in the woods one night, Mia kisses Frida. Frida is ready and willing to reciprocate, and the women soon have sex for the first time. However, the weekend over, Mia must return to Stockholm and her life with Tim, and Frida to her life partner Elin.

Mia asks Frida to run away with her to Spain, but Frida reminds her of her upcoming wedding to Tim. Frida breaks up with Elin, and Mia backs out of the wedding. Frida runs away, deciding on Spain as a destination. Mia attempts to find her by asking Elin, who refuses to tell her, and then Elisabeth, who tells her that Frida's flight departs soon. She rushes to the airport but misses Frida's flight. Mia goes on to Spain where she and Frida share a happy reunion.

== Cast ==
- Ruth Vega Fernandez as Mia
- Liv Mjönes as Frida
- Krister Henriksson as Lasse
- Lena Endre as Elisabeth
- Joakim Nätterqvist as Tim
- Tom Ljungman as Oskar
- Josefine Tengblad as Elin

== Music ==
The music for the film includes original scores arranged by Marc Collin, as well as songs by artists including José González, Kultiration, and Robyn.

== Reception ==
The film received a somewhat positive review from Mats Johnson in Göteborgs-Posten, who called it as a "sensual and beautiful love film." While criticising the film's conclusion, he praised the performances and Ragna Jorming's cinematography.

== See also ==
- List of LGBT films directed by women
- List of Swedish films of the 2010s
