= Astrid Assefa =

Swedish singer, actor and theatre director

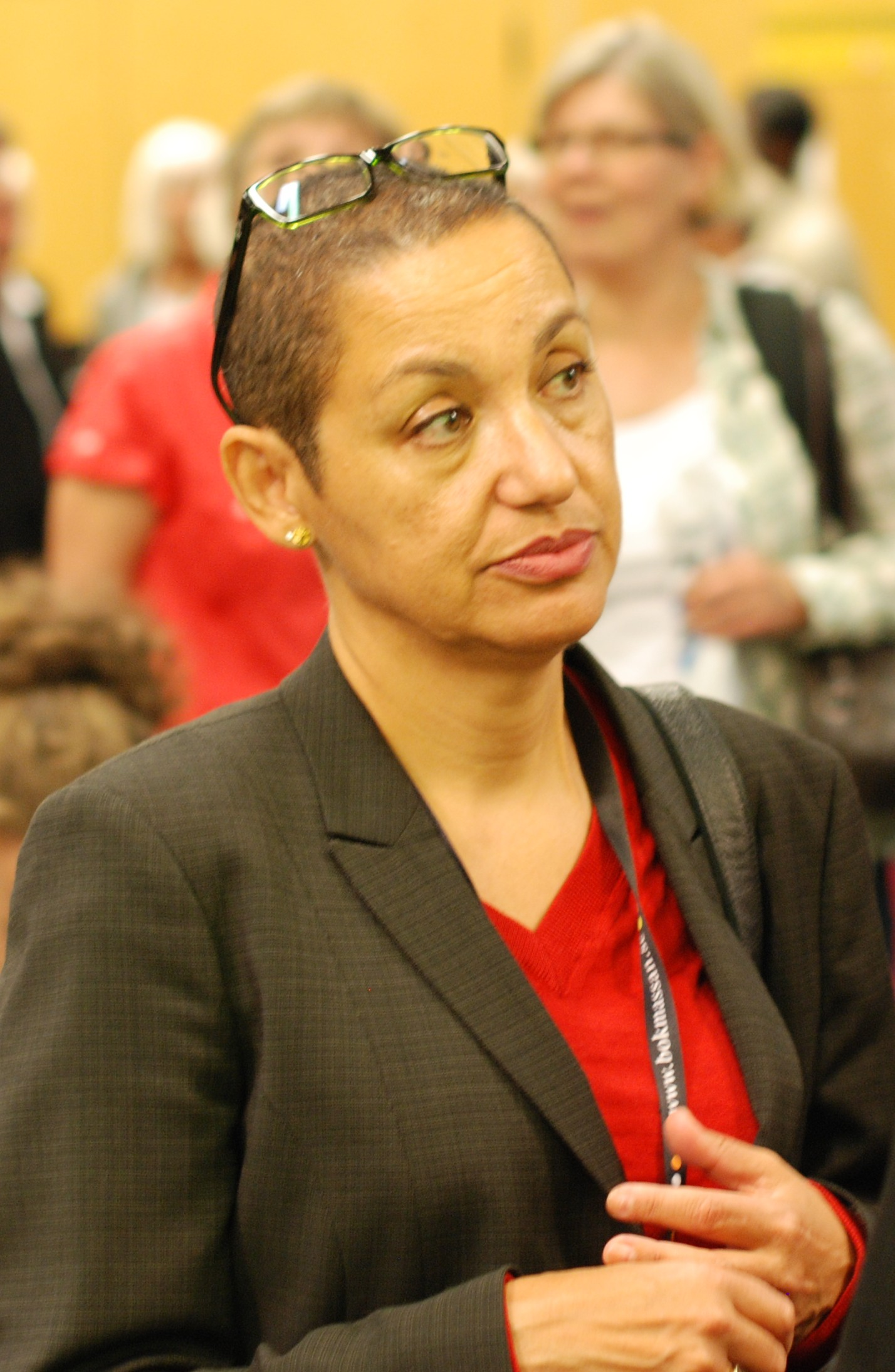
- Assefa in 2010
- Born: Astrid Margaretha Engelbrektsson; 7 February 1953 (age 73); Arvika, Sweden
- Occupations: Singer; actress; theater director

Astrid Margaretha Assefa (née Engelbrektsson; born 7 February 1953) is a Swedish singer, actress and theater director. She is best known for her acting appearances in Cool Kids Don't Cry (2014), Stockholm East (2011) and 30:e November (1995).

== Career ==
She was born in 1953 to an Ethiopian father and a Swedish mother. Assefa studied at the state stage school in Gothenburg and has been involved with the Royal Dramatic Theatre, The National Swedish Touring Theatre (Sweden's largest tour theater), the Folkeatern in Gävle and Stockholm City Theatre. She worked as a theater teacher at the University of Addis Ababa in Ethiopia. She served as head of the Dalateatern theater in Falun and became chairman of the board of The Dramatic Institute, now Stockholm Drama College. She once served as an expert on the State Investigation Immigration Policy Committee. She also participated as a guest in Allsång på Skansen, an all-song program in Stockholm broadcast in Swedish Television almost every summer since 3 August 1979. In 2005 Assefa debuted on "Summer on P1", a program on Sweden's Radio P1 broadcast every summer. She played Hazel in a 2019 Riksteatern production of Barnen by Lucy Kirkwood. She and her husband have one daughter.
