= Bamse =

Swedish cartoon

Bamse – The World's Strongest Teddy Bear
- Bamse, the title character, carrying a jar of honey.

Publication information
- Publisher: Williams förlag (1973–1976); Semic Press (1976); Atlantic förlag (1977–1982); Rune A-serier (1982–1988); Bamse Förlaget (1988–1990); Egmont Group (1990–)
- Format: Ongoing series
- Publication date: 1966–present

Creative team
- Created by: Rune Andréasson

Logo

Bamse – Världens starkaste björn (Swedish for 'Bamse – The World's Strongest Teddy Bear') is a Swedish cartoon created by Rune Andréasson. The highly popular children's cartoon first emerged as a series of television short films as well as a weekly half-page Sunday strip in 1966, before being published periodically in its own comic magazine since 1973.

Andréasson did all the artwork himself until 1975 and wrote all the comics until 1990. Francisco Tora did all the illustrations from 1976 until he was joined by Bo Michanek in 1983. Several new writers and illustrators were hired in the early 1990s, including Claes Reimerthi, Olof Siverbo, Johan Wanloo and Tony Cronstam. Andréasson continued to do the magazine cover illustrations until 1992.

The series somewhat changed direction when Bamse had children, specifically triplets, in 1982. He had a fourth child in 1986, and his friend Lille Skutt had one at the same time; this saw the series focus more on family, while also discussing other values such as gender equality. In 1989, the character Skalman noticed that Bamse's fourth child Brumma had some intellectual disability, later defined as her being on the Autism spectrum, which again brought up the subject of equality. The children did develop in real time within the magazine, but seem to have been fixed in age since around 1990. They are now around nine years old, in a narratively advantageous eternal state as third-graders.

Both the early Sunday strips and the early magazines have since been reprinted as glossy hardbound volumes.

In 1998, the theme park Bamses Värld ('Bamse's World') started as an attraction at the Kolmården Wildlife Park, with theater performances, restaurants and houses from the comic.

== Characters ==
=== Protagonists ===
- Bamse, the main character, is a brown bear who becomes the world's strongest bear by eating a type of honey called dunderhonung (lit. 'thunder-honey'), specially prepared for him by his grandmother. Almost anyone else who eats it, apart from Bamse's pet bee and his daughter Nallemaja, ends up with three days of stomach ache. Bamse is also the kindest bear in the world (according to the comic), and is often seen helping those in need. The name Bamse comes from a Scandinavian word for 'bear' or 'teddy bear'. Bamse can also translate to 'giant' or 'big one', though that would be something of a misnomer, as Bamse is rather diminutive in size compared to many of the other characters.
- Brummelisa ('Growlelisa') is the daughter of a forester who could always rely on Bamse helping out; soon they fell in love. In 1981, they all went on a boat trip to the north of Scandinavia (financed by individual odd jobs), climaxing in a view of the midnight sun (an anti-climax to grandma's cat and mouse who expected it to look different). Back home, Brummelisa and Bamse staged a secret wedding and became parents to triplets: Brum ('Growl'), Teddy, Nalle-Maja ('Teddy-Maja'). Brum is artistically gifted, but somewhat shy. Teddy spends a lot of time by himself, and loves reading and learning. Nalle-Maja is the most extrovert kid, and loves sports and activities. Once their personalities began to shine through Teddy gravitated towards Skalman who noticed what the others failed to; Teddy's clumsiness stems from his eyesight and only needed a pair of glasses. Nalle-Maja has inherited more than just her father's looks; she also inherited his ability to get strong from the dunderhonung. To prevent her from injuring herself or her brothers, Bamse's grandmother attempted a new dunderhonung recipe to avoid making her strong. She partially succeeded; Nalle-Maja draws strength from it, but also winds up with the stomach ache. In late 1985 the triplets were informed on the arrival of another sibling; Brumma ('Growla'), who – when eating dunderhonung – neither gets strong nor is affected by the stomach ache.
- Lille Skutt ('Little Hop') is Bamse's and Skalman's best friend. He is a very fast but notoriously frightened white rabbit with a red bow tie. However, his ability to run quick and jump far (not to mention braving his fears whenever someone he cares about is in danger) has saved his friends' skins on more than one occasion. Lille Skutt is the village postman, albeit on a part-time basis. He also works part-time as the head chef of the local restaurant. Like Bamse, Skutt ended up marrying his girlfriend, Nina Kanin ('Nina Rabbit'), best friend of Brummelisa. Nina and Skutt became parents to a son, Mini-Hopp ('Mini-Hop'), a hyperactive child with an apparent lack of fear. He has eight siblings, including Happ. Happ is a gay rabbit. He and his life-partner Lille Sixten have adopted a little girl named Suddan, who is slightly younger than Mini-Hopp.
- Skalman ('Shellman, Shellback') is an ingenious tortoise who invents all sorts of things, including spacecraft and time machines. He stores just about anything in his carapace except for locomotives, spaceships or atlantic steamboats (and also firewood, due to him getting splinters in the back). Skalman seems to be a polyphasic sleeper, and according to himself, his best invention is the food-and-sleep clock, whose calls he follows slavishly, even at times when sleep seems highly inappropriate. To this date, he has only ignored the alarm call a few times, including the discovery of a dinosaur's egg, the birth of Bamse's children, and a state of deep depression due to the false belief that his carelessness had caused the death of Bamse's children. Also, he has once mentioned that he is in one way unlike everyone else – if he would actually eat sleeping draught, he cannot sleep at all for a quite long time – not even when the alarm calls. None of the other characters come close to Skalman's intellectual level and he is sometimes seen playing chess with himself (he has stated that he has met and beaten the chess world champion). Rune Andréasson said that he brought the food-and-sleep clock into the series for much the same reason as the dunderhonung; during a dangerous adventure, Skalman could just pull something out of his carapace to save them, or help the trio with his intellect. That is when the food-and-sleep clock calls Skalman to sleep, forcing Bamse and Lille Skutt to think on their own.
- Vargen ('The Wolf') is a black wolf who was the original main villain (later antihero) of the comic; a criminal and a bully who at one point was named "World Champion of Evil" by his colleagues, but later on proved to not be such a bad person if given a chance. Vargen grew up on the wrong side of the tracks and was introduced to a life of crime by his villainous stepfathers. When they eventually ended up in prison he knew that it was time to make a fresh start but his past turned against him as nobody wanted to give him the chance to better his life. Bamse, however, did, and eventually managed to reform the wolf by consistently treating him with kindness. Vargen occasionally slips back into his old ways, but as far as the other wolves are concerned he blew it by joining Bamse's club.

=== Antagonists ===
- Krösus Sork ('Croesus Vole') is an often cruel capitalist and secondary villain of the comic; born as a banker's son he was forced to play second fiddle to his brother Slösus (rough translation 'Wasteus') who could not put a foot wrong. After Slösus later won a lottery (ticket number 88), Krösus forged his own ticket (number 89), switched the tickets, claimed Slösus' prize and let the unknowing Slösus get detained for forgery while using the prize to build up his criminal empire. Slösus was devastated to discover the truth after his release and they had a falling-out. While Krösus has on occasion showed some small shred of conscience and generally commits crimes for self-profit and not out of cruelty, he seems the most amoral of the series' classic villains, willing to do just about anything that will improve his net worth. He displays an opulent lifestyle, regularly smoking expensive cigars (which he frequently swallows, while burning, when Bamse unexpectedly thwarts his schemes) and is never seen without his signature top hat, striped trousers and wingtip shoes, and decorates his office with gold and artworks, but seems to primarily enjoy hoarding wealth rather than enjoy a life of luxury (one of several characteristics he shares with Scrooge McDuck). Krösus employs an army of voles for tasks such as burglary and fencing, generally avoiding punishment due to keeping his hands clean from dirt, on one occasion literally (disposing his gloves to avoid marks from handling inked money). As Bamse's children remarks on one occasion he does not seem to have friends, with all his relationships (with the partial exception of his brother) being strictly transactional and any conversation not disclosing information or concluding an obligation is quickly terminated, with the moniker "time is money!". In short, Krösus represents a crude image of the capitalist system and its logic, which featured prominently in early Bamse comics.
- Kapten Buster ('Captain Buster') and his three clumsy sideman pirates, Rusken, Slusken and Stollen (approximate translation: 'Rover, Sloven and Silly'). They are largely incompetent and unsuccessful, and have mostly given up their life at sea thanks to a tendency towards seasickness.
- Knocke & Smocke ('Knocker & Socker') are two large thugs with flat caps who have performed several unsuccessful criminal attempts. They usually rely mainly on brute force and are generally outwitted by Skalman or others.
- Reinard is a sly fox and the newest main villain of the comic, who became an addition to the crew in 2006. He is shown to engage in all kinds of villainy, from shoplifting to explicit attempts on Bamse's life (which, curiously, has resulted in no retribution, or even rebuking, from Bamse's side). Reinard is narcissistic, completely selfish with no seeming regard for others' well-being; in addition, he frequently manipulates other characters into committing immoral acts seemingly for his own amusement, which make him the perhaps most vile (or even psychotic) character in the Bamse universe. While Reinard may appear irredeemable, his "weak spot" is his romantic attachment to Mickelina, also a fox, which has blurred his evil schemes on numerous occasions.

== Moral values and criticism ==
The magazine has educational goals. On special "school" pages, the characters educate the reader about animals, cultures, the Universe, and other subjects. They often deal with superstition, and Skalman's sceptical views ("I only believe in what I know") wins over those of his more naive friends. On the other hand, beings like trolls, tomtar and dragons exist on a very real plane in most of the stories. As the series has evolved, the values expressed have become more general and less ideological. A fact sheet written and published by Andreasson in 1983 following a trip to the People's Republic of China became controversial as it seemed to praise Mao Zedong's dictatorial rule as a "liberation" and claimed that "nobody's starving anymore" in China under Communist single-party rule. It was later edited heavily when the adventure was reprinted in 2004.

Bamse and his friends are very clear about their views. They are strongly opposed to racism, bullying and violence. Bamse is not only the strongest bear in the world, but also the kindest, often repeating his slogan "Nobody gets better from being beaten". Bamse's own world seems to have strong implications of anarchism or libertarian socialism, combining private ownership with communitarian solidarity (from most of the characters), though a single policeman, Pontus Kask (named for his classic-style policeman's helmet, or kask in Swedish) and a small prison exists.

The original villain, a black wolf simply called Vargen ('The Wolf'), became a friend of Bamse after consistently being treated kindly. The only villain that is depicted as unredeemable is Krösus Sork ('Croesus Vole'), a crude capitalist who will do practically anything for money. Later, the fox Reinard Räv ('Reinard the Fox') was introduced, which contradicted this earlier narrative. While shown as on the edge of society, Reinard is intelligent but uses his skills and efforts at disrupting the social order as a good in itself. By enjoying turning people "on the edge" to a life of crime he displays outright antisocial characteristics, roughly mirroring Batman's antagonist The Joker or Shakespeare's Iago in this regard.

== Films and other media ==
Six animated black-and-white short films were produced for television in 1966. In 1972, seven more animated shorts were shown in colour. Another two shorts were released in 1981, and a direct-to-video film became available in 1991.

The later colour films have aired frequently on TV in Sweden, and have been released on VHS and DVD. The black and white films had been unavailable to the general public for a long time, but were released on DVD by late 2006. The colour films were low-budget productions with actor Olof Thunberg narrating and voicing all characters, but are considered to be classics. The musical theme, composed by Sten Carlberg, is easily recognised by most Swedes.

In 1993, a Game Boy game (in Swedish) was released, loosely based on the Bamse characters. The game was little more than a sprite replacement of Beam Software's Baby T-Rex and received generally poor reviews. The "Bamse version" has not been officially released outside Sweden.

In October 2006, forty years after Bamse was created, Ola Andréasson, the son of creator Rune Andréasson announced an animated feature film, featuring better animation, a full voice cast, and a budget of SEK 25 million. The film was released in 2014 as Bamse and the City of Thieves. It was followed by Bamse and the Witch's Daughter in 2016, Bamse and the Thunderbell in 2018, Bamse and the Volcano Island in 2021 and Bamse and the World's Smallest Adventure in 2023.

== Translations ==
In the 1960s, there were a few translations of the series Bamses skola 'Bamse's school', where the characters were given English names:

- Bamse – Bamsy
- Skalman – Professor Shellback
- Lille Skutt – Little Frisky
- Vargen – Willie
- Farmor – Granny
- Katten Janson (literally 'Janson the Cat') – Sooty

In this translation, the dunderhonung was given the name magic honey. However, in the 1980s, Andréasson referred to it in English as thunder-honey, which is the literal translation also used in the Netherlands and Belgium (donderhoning).

In the cancelled film Bamse and the Time-Travel Machine from 2009, the names were translated differently:

- Bamse – Bamse
- Skalman – Shellman
- Lille Skutt – Little Skip
- Krösus Sork – Victor Vole
- Dunderhonung – Superhoney

== History ==
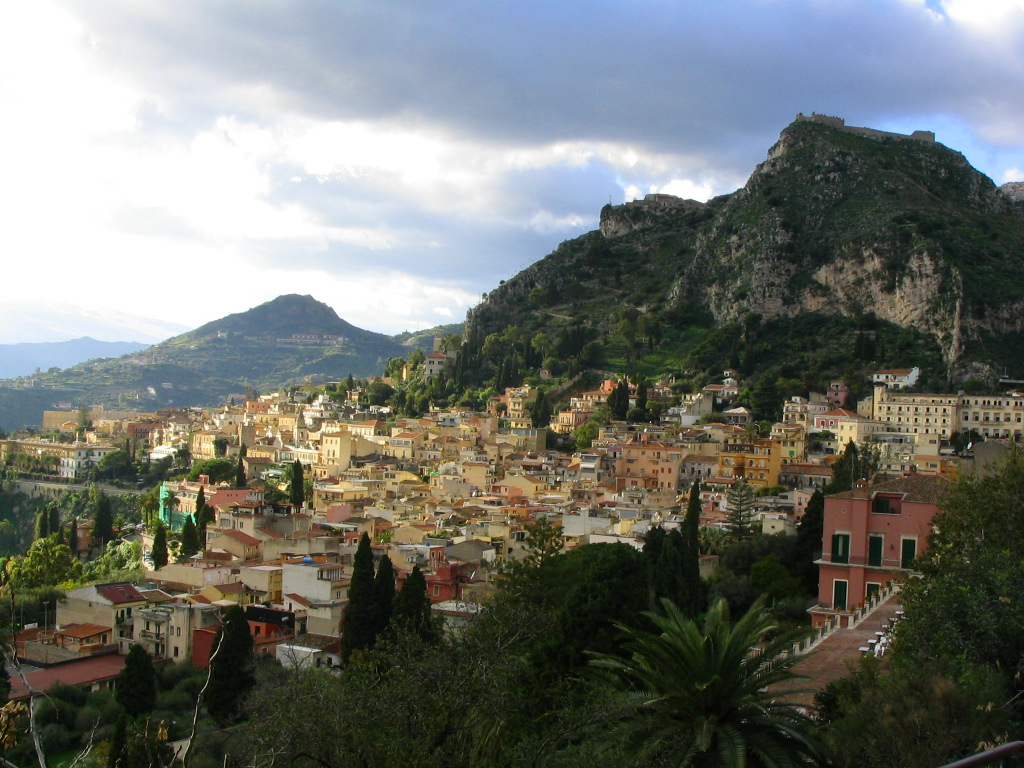
The hilly town of Taormina Taormina in Sicily inspired Rune Andréasson to create the hills where Bamse lives.

=== Predecessors (1940s/50s) ===
Before Rune Andréasson created Bamse, he had tried his luck with several other series. Several of them - Brum, Nalle ritar och berättar and Teddy - were about bears. Teddy had the subtitle ‘the world's strongest bear’ and a character gallery that was very similar to the characters that later appeared in Bamse, with both an early Skalman and a slightly bolder brown rabbit named Lasse Skutt.

Andréasson regretted that he had made Teddy so strong without giving him any weakness. To make the series exciting, he often had to put Teddy to sleep, and it eventually became very repetitive. So the idea of Bamse was born - a little bear who is only strong when he has eaten dunderhonung, who can do many things, but not everything.

The names Brum, Teddy and Nalle later inspired the names of Bamse's children Brum, Teddy and Nalle-Maja.

=== The black and white films (1966) ===
Bamse made his debut as the title character in six black-and-white cartoons on Sveriges Radio-TV, starting on 29 October 1966. (The six black-and-white films have been available since 2006 on the compilation DVD Bamse: De första äventyren.) At the same time, the first craft books featuring the Bamse characters were published.

=== Weekly series (1966–1970) ===
Two days after the second film had been shown, on 7 November 1966, Allers number 46 was published with the opening episode of the Bamse weekly series. This continued for 3.5 years with Rune Andréasson as the sole author. The fourteenth and final Allers adventure ended in Allers issue 12 in 1970. During this period, the first Bamse storybook was published.

=== The colour films (1972–1973; 1981; 1991) ===
After Bamse ended as a series in Allers, seven new short films, this time in colour, were shown on Sveriges Radio-TV in the winter of 1972-1973. The films have since been rebroadcast several times, and were extended with three more episodes.

=== The comic book (1973–) ===
From January 1973 (coinciding with the new Bamse colour films), the magazine Bamse - världens starkaste björn was available on newsstands. The magazine went on to become one of the best-selling comic books in Sweden.

=== New cartoonists enter the picture (1976–) ===
From the year of publication 1976, the comics were drawn by the Spaniard Francisco Torá, and from 1983 also by the Swede Bo Michanek, with Andréasson remaining the sole scriptwriter. In 1990, Andréasson retired from magazine production (though not completely; he continued to draw the front page of the magazine for a few more years) and handed over the magazine to the current Egmont Kärnan, whose Bamse editorial team employed additional freelancers on both the script and drawing sides. In July 2018, the Bamse editorial team consisted of Joakim Gunnarsson, Lise Jörgensen, Anna Bergström and Charlotta Borelius.

=== Nature of the series ===
The show, originally a comedy adventure series, became known over time for addressing important justice issues for children, including social issues such as bullying, racism, child abuse, disabilities, drugs and gender equality. During the 1970s, the series was widely considered to have a clear left-wing political orientation. In 1982, Bamse started a family, which led to more and more stories revolving around children.
