= The Swimsuit Issue =

- Swedish cover
- Swedish: Allt flyter
- Directed by: Måns Herngren
- Written by: Jane Magnusson; Måns Herngren; Brian Cordray
- Cinematography: Henrik Stenberg
- Edited by: Fredrik Morheden
- Music by: Ebbot Lundberg
- Distributed by: Nordisk Film AB
- Release date: 25 December 2008
- Country: Sweden
- Language: Swedish

The Swimsuit Issue (Swedish: Allt flyter; lit. 'Everything floats') is a 2008 Swedish film directed by Måns Herngren.

== Plot ==
Fredrik discovers synchronised swimming and recruits some friends to compete in an international competition for men.

== Cast ==
- Jonas Inde as Fredrik;
- Amanda Davin as Sara;
- Andreas Rothlin-Svensson as Charles;
- Jimmy Lindström as Larry;
- Peter Gardiner as Victor;
- Benny Haag as Peter;
- Shebly Niavarani as Börje;
- Kalle Westerdahl as Markus;
- Maria Langhammer as Lillemor.
