= Patrik Andersson (producer) =

Swedish film producer

Patrik Andersson is a Swedish film producer, and head of development for B-Reel Films based in Stockholm.

== Filmography ==
- Fanny, Alexander & jag, (2012)
- Hotell, (2013)
- A Living Soul, (short, 2014, executive)
- Foodies: The Cultural Jet Set, (2014)
- Welcome to Norway, (co-producer, 2014)
- A Serious Game, (2016)
- Euphoria, (2017)
- Midsommar, (2019)
