= Greyzone =

2018 Danish–Swedish television series

- Also known as: Gråzon
- Genre: Thriller
- Written by: Morten Dragsted; Oskar Söderlund; Mikkel Bak Sørensen; Rasmus Thorsen
- Directed by: Jesper W. Nielsen; Fredrik Edfeldt; Jörgen Bergmark
- Starring: Birgitte Hjort Sørensen; Ardalan Esmaili; Joachim Fjelstrup; Tova Magnusson; Lars Ranthe; Johan Rabaeus; Virgil Katring-Rasmussen; Christopher Wollter; Özlem Saglanmak; Kida Khodr Ramadan; Karin Franz Körlof; Olaf Højgaard; Jessica Liedberg
- Composer: Henrik Lindstrand
- Countries of origin: Denmark; Sweden
- Original languages: Danish; Swedish
- No. of seasons: 1
- No. of episodes: 10

Production
- Executive producers: Pernille Bech Christensen; Johanna Bergenstråhle; Wolfgang Feindt; Thomas Gammeltoft; Johan Hedman; Tomas Hostrup-Larsen; Elin Kvist; Peter Nadermann
- Producer: Rasmus Thorsen
- Cinematography: Erik Zappon; Linus Eklund; Erik Molberg Hansen
- Editors: Niels Ostenfeld; Elin Pröjts; Frederik Strunk
- Running time: 45 mins. approx
- Production company: Cosmo Film

Original release
- Network: C More; TV4 Sweden; TV2 Denmark
- Release: 22 February – 29 April 2018

Greyzone is a Swedish-Danish thriller drama series, co-created and written by Morten Dragsted, Oskar Söderlund, Mikkel Bak Sørensen and Rasmus Thorsen that first broadcast on 22 February 2018 on C More. Starring Birgitte Hjort Sørensen as drone expert Victoria Rahbek, Greyzone centres on the days leading up to a terror attack and Victoria's kidnap at the hands of a terror cell who require access to the technological arsenal of her employers, SparrowSat.

The series also aired on TV4 in Sweden under the title Gråzon, on TV2 in Denmark and on Channel 4 in the United Kingdom, premiering on 13 February 2019, and airing weekly at 10:45pm. The entire series was also made available to watch on All 4.

== Cast ==
- Birgitte Hjort Sørensen as Victoria Rahbek, a Danish engineer for Swedish drone company SparrowSat
- Ardalan Esmaili as Iyad Adi Kassar, a Swedish-Syrian terrorist and former classmate of Victoria
- Joachim Fjelstrup as Detective Jesper Lassen, Danish Security and Intelligence Service (PET)
- Tova Magnusson as Detective Inspector Eva Forsberg, Swedish Security Service (SÄPO)
- Lars Ranthe as Henrik Dalum, Danish Security and Intelligence Service (PET) Head of Operations
- Johan Rabaeus as Major Lars Björklund, Swedish Military Intelligence and Security Service (MUST)
- Virgil Katring-Rasmussen as Oskar Rahbek Lindsbye, Victoria's son
- Christopher Wollter as Johan Hedmark, Victoria's boss at SparrowSat
- Özlem Saglanmak as Marjan Rajavi, Danish Security and Intelligence Service (PET) Intelligence Analyst
- Kida Khodr Ramadan as Rami Wahim / Al-Shishani, the Lebanese leader of Islamic terror organisation Sayf
- Karin Franz Körlof as Linda Laaksonen, Victoria's colleague at SparrowSat
- Olaf Højgaard as Claes Palova, a Danish man working with Al-Shishani and Sayf
- Jessica Liedberg as Christina Helander, Swedish Security Service (SÄPO)
- Morten Kirkskov as Major Andreas Tange, Danish Defence Intelligence Service (FE)
- Thomas Niehaus as Martin Okmann, German Federal Intelligence Service (BND)

== Episodes ==
No.	Title	Directed by	Written by	Swedish Air Date
1	"The Takeover"	Jesper W. Nielsen	Rasmus Thorsen, Morten Dragsted, Oskar Söderlund & Mikkel Bak Sørensen	22 February 2018
SÄPO Detective Eva Forsberg accompanies customs officers to apprehend a truck carrying a suspected terrorist at the Port of Gothenburg, however, a gunfight breaks out and the driver escapes. Police later discover a stolen NATO bomb concealed in the vehicle, which results in SÄPO having to liaise with military intelligence officer Lars Björklund. When the driver is caught on CCTV entering Copenhagen, Forsberg travels to Denmark to work alongside PET detectives Henrik Dalum and Jesper Lassen, making use of Lassen’s network of sources to try and locate the driver. She later receives information from Björklund that two bombs were stolen from the NATO base in Greece, meaning another is still unaccounted for. It is believed they were due to be sold to Ukrainian separatists. In Frankfurt, Danish engineer Victoria Rahbek gives a presentation for Swedish drone company SparrowSat’s newest product. Although the company specialises in agriculture drones, the impressive technology results in SparrowSat being made a purchase offer by military contractor ZUW. At the conference, she meets with an old classmate Iyad Kassar, a tech journalist, and agrees to give him an interview. Later that evening back in Copenhagen she and Iyad conduct the interview, but he then drugs her and lets another man into the apartment, who installs various cameras and listening devices.
2	"First Mission"	Jesper W. Nielsen	Rasmus Thorsen, Morten Dragsted, Oskar Söderlund & Mikkel Bak Sørensen	4 March 2018
Victoria is threatened by Iyad and a masked man, who state if she doesn’t do what they say they will have their men kill her son Oskar (currently on holiday in Paris with her ex-husband). She and Iyad travel to Stockholm, where he forces her to extract information from her boss Johan’s laptop at SparrowSat headquarters. Eva and Jesper meet one of the latter's informants, a local Imam named Naveed, who tells them unknown men have contacted him wanting transport for an injured man to Germany. He meets with the men as part of a sting operation, where they agree on where he will pick up the injured driver. PET discovers the men are Albanian and track them to an internet café. The location is raided by the Politiets Aktionsstyrke, but the driver escapes despite being chased by Eva. Afterward, Naveed is approached in his mosque by a man claiming he wants revenge for injustice, but after the two talk the man stabs him to death. Back in Copenhagen, Iyad speaks with someone via phone who informs him they have picked up the missing driver. He then tells Victoria he will be staying with her longer, and that she needs to show him the drone flight controller.
3	"The Return"	Jesper W. Nielsen	Rasmus Thorsen, Morten Dragsted, Oskar Söderlund & Mikkel Bak Sørensen	11 March 2018
Oskar flies back from Paris early after Victoria’s ex-husband is hospitalised in the city. Victoria is reluctantly forced to allow him to return, under the guise Iyad is an old classmate from Lund University visiting, however, the child quickly becomes suspicious of the situation. Iyad forces her to show him how to disconnect geofences so drones can be flown into various no fly zones and later demands she steal a prototype of the BAT flight controller during SparrowSat anniversary celebrations in Stockholm. When the truck driver is discovered dead, SÄPO, MUST and PET liaise with Andreas Tange of the Danish Defence Intelligence Service, believing a terrorist attack is imminent. The German BND identifies the driver as a Chechen national named Hazdem Mukhamed, although can’t establish any terror links. Jesper and Eva bug the Albanians' apartment, where they identify Hazdem by another name; Rami Hussein. Returning to Stockholm to retrace the man’s movements, Eva is told in confidence by Björklund he has intel a terror group has set targets on Scandinavia. Examining the manifests of the flights taken to Stockholm by Hazdem, Eva discovers Victoria was also on all of them, bringing her to the focus of PET.
4	"A Chance"	Jesper W. Nielsen	Rasmus Thorsen, Morten Dragsted, Oskar Söderlund & Mikkel Bak Sørensen	18 March 2018
Jesper goes against orders and visits Victoria, pretending to be investigating burglaries. He quickly leaves but informs Eva something seems wrong with her. He is later taken to meet with a woman and baby in witness protection, revealed to be his family from an undercover relationship infiltrating a terror cell, now in hiding from the woman’s brother. PET recovers a text message from Hazdems phone, an ISO code linked to a shipping container. They track it to Hässleholm, but the second warhead has already been taken. At SparrowSat headquarters, Iyad uses the stolen data from Johan to hack into the CCTV system and cover Victoria stealing the BAT flight controller. Back in Denmark, Iyad reveals he came from Syria to Sweden as a child, but his parents and sister did not make it and died. She later drugs him with sleeping pills and tries to escape, but is quickly recaptured. Iyad meets with Naveed’s killer, who tells him the plan is coming into place. Eva uncovers footage from Arlanda airport showing Victoria trying to call for help when she and Iyad first travelled there and asks Jesper about his encounter with her. Examining the phone number she gave him, they uncover a secret binary code saying “HELP”.
5	"Recruited"	Jesper W. Nielsen	Rasmus Thorsen, Morten Dragsted, Oskar Söderlund & Mikkel Bak Sørensen	25 March 2018
Iyad demands Victoria calibrate the BAT controller for military function, but she needs to travel back to Stockholm to acquire the geo-fence disabling code from her colleague Linda at SparrowSat. She is met in secret by Eva at Kastrup Airport who makes her aware she is being tracked but is told to continue with the mission so they can later save both her and Oskar. PET attempts to track a woman tailing Victoria at the airport but loses her when she returns to urban Copenhagen. PET discovers one of SparrowSat’s new projects is JADDE (Joint Alliance for Defense Drones, Europe). Björklund proposes to the team that instead of just rescuing Victoria, they use her as a resource to get to the heart of the terror cell before they carry out the attack. Police psychiatrist approves the decision, but Jesper remains concerned. Under the guise of visiting Oskar’s special needs teacher, Victoria is again met by Eva and Jesper, who explain the plan to her. Victoria is angry and reluctant, but eventually agrees when she realises going into witness protection would ruin hers and Oskar’s lives, and even if Iyad is arrested there may be more members of the cell who could track them down.
6	"Double Agent"	Fredrik Edfeldt	Rasmus Thorsen, Morten Dragsted, Oskar Söderlund & Mikkel Bak Sørensen	1 April 2018
Victoria’s apartment is put under surveillance, having previously agreed various covert alert signals with Eva and Jesper should her cover be blown. SÄPO discovers that Iyad was married with a child, but they (and according to official records, him also) were killed in a car accident in Jordan in 2013. Iyad demands Victoria run a simulation drone flight with the BAT controller on a military Pilgrim V11. She meets Eva and Jesper at Oskar's kindergarten and tells them, and is given a device to plug into Iyad’s phone to decrypt it so they can monitor his calls. The United Kingdom claims to have information on Iyad post-2013, but refuse to provide it unless Sweden extradites a recently arrested Saudi businessman wanted in the UK for terrorist money laundering. Björklund convinces the Prosecutor-General to do so. Eva receives news her estranged daughter Tove has been hospitalised from drug use, and Jesper expresses his paranoia over the lack of information on Iyad's alleged death. The British intel reveals in 2014 Iyad was interrogated in a black site in Egypt by American and Egyptian soldiers, but managed to escape with terrorist leader Al-Shishani, who was recently seen in Hamburg and now believed to be in Scandinavia.
7	"The Sacrifice"	Fredrik Edfeldt	Rasmus Thorsen, Morten Dragsted, Oskar Söderlund & Mikkel Bak Sørensen	8 April 2018
Eva visits her daughter in the hospital but is rebuffed and asked to leave. Problems arise with the BAT controller, with it needing the newer version of the software to function properly without bugs. Iyad forces Victoria to again return to Stockholm and obtain it. She is caught by her colleague Linda, who takes the hard drive, but Victoria convinces her she was only copying the information due to suspicions their boss Johan is committing insider trading in the lead up to SparrowSat’s acquisition by ZUW. Jesper tells Victoria she needs an excuse to see the drone in person so it can be located, as assures her SÄPO will protect Linda. Henrik reluctantly aborts a mission to extract Victoria and Oskar, as they cannot guarantee Oskar’s safety when he remains in the flat with Iyad. The woman from the airport follows Linda to her house, but Eva delays ground agents permission to enter, allowing the woman to kill Linda and escape with the drive. The team identifies her as Yoana Malak, a French-Moroccan, and start to track her movements in Sweden. Later that evening, Iyad denies anything happened to Linda, but Victoria soon after is told of her death by Johan, causing her to break down and attack Iyad.
8	"Survival Skills"	Fredrik Edfeldt	Rasmus Thorsen, Morten Dragsted, Oskar Söderlund & Mikkel Bak Sørensen	15 April 2018
Meeting with Eva and Jesper, Victoria furiously admonishes them over Linda’s death but informs them only 24 hours more work is needed on the drone. The police psychologist states there is a risk Victoria has developed Stockholm syndrome and lost faith in the team. Iyad takes Victoria and Oskar to a holiday park in Gilleleje where he tells her to finish calibrating the BAT with the new software. Jesper tells her to get close with Iyad to uncover the drone location, and a PET agent bugs the room. Iyad becomes considerably closer with Oskar, teaching him to dive and hallucinating his own son in his place. Jesper and Eva visit Iyad’s in-laws in Lund, where they discover Björklund questioned them immediately after the family’s death in Jordan. Jesper then secretly meets with Aisha, the mother of his child in witness protection. Eva’s boss Christina calls in a favour with the Jordanian General Intelligence Directorate to uncover more on the death of Iyad’s family. They discover it was not an auto accident, but a targeted American drone strike to kill a terrorist leader aboard the bus. Iyad, the only survivor, was imprisoned to keep quiet about the attack. Iyad tells Victoria the same information, and the two later sleep together.
9	"Simone"	Jörgen Bergmark	Rasmus Thorsen, Morten Dragsted, Oskar Söderlund & Mikkel Bak Sørensen	22 April 2018
Iyad promises Victoria she and Oskar will be free once she gets the drone in the air, but Al-Shishani tells him to kill them once the BAT is installed. The team identifies Iyad's accomplice as Claes Palova, a Danish citizen, but refuse to raid his flat until discovering the location of the drone. Christina obtains unofficial information on the Jordan drone strike from MUST, indicating they previously knew of Iyad’s background. Claes leaves the apartment and a tech team enters. Transferring his data, they find maps of the Danish Ministry of Defence, ascertaining the group plans to attack a Nordic Defence Cooperation conference the following day. Claes realises the apartment has been entered, as the tech team returned the wrong pet cat once they left. Iyad moves to Plan B, taking Oskar and Victoria to a shop in the city where they meet Claes and Al-Shishani. The group escapes via a trapdoor, and an explosive detonates as Jesper and a Politiets Aktionsstyrke unit enter the building. Iyad speaks with Oskar, but when the boy doesn’t recognise the name “Simone” (who Victoria told him was the special needs teacher she kept meeting at the school), Iyad realises that she has been lying and working with the security services.
10	"A New World"	Jörgen Bergmark	Rasmus Thorsen, Morten Dragsted, Oskar Söderlund & Mikkel Bak Sørensen	29 April 2018
The group travels by ferry from Denmark to Helsingborg, Kingdom of Sweden. Both the Swedish Air Force and Royal Danish Air Force put fighter jets on standby, and the team prepares to extract Victoria. The group meets with Malak at the drone's location on a farm, where Al-Shishani tells Iyad they now plan to target the Rigshospitalet in Copenhagen. Iyad objects, feeling hospital patients are not guilty compared to military officials. The drone is activated and takes off, but remains off radar at low altitude requiring a visual search. Eva and Jesper head to the launch location in Småland. Claes moves to execute Victoria and Oskar, but Iyad kills him before he can do so. He tells the two to run and then returns to the farm, where Malak and Al-Shishani discover he recalibrated the drone to attack their location. Malak shoots him, but then he and the whole group are killed when the drone detonates. Iyad is identified as one of the terrorists in various news reports, but during her debriefing with Henrik, Victoria angrily rebuts his assumptions the drones change in location was a technical error. Eva decides to leave SÄPO and angrily confronts Björklund for covering up the Jordan strike, accusing him of creating Iyad’s terroristic views and benefiting from the situation by being promoted to the European Defence Agency. Jesper returns to work recruiting informants for PET. Victoria and Oskar visit Iyad’s family grave and place down a bunch of flowers. Oskar notices the incorrect date and asks if it is possible to die twice, to which Victoria replies no, but in a way that is what Iyad did.
