= The Giant (2016 film) =

2016 film

- Film poster
- Swedish: Jätten
- Directed by: Johannes Nyholm
- Written by: Johannes Nyholm
- Produced by: Maria Dahlin
- Starring: Christian Andrén
- Cinematography: Johan Lundborg
- Edited by: Morten Højbjerg; Johannes Nyholm
- Music by: Björn Olsson
- Release dates: 9 September 2016 (TIFF); 14 October 2016 (Sweden)
- Running time: 86 minutes
- Countries: Denmark; Sweden
- Language: Swedish

The Giant (Swedish: Jätten) is a 2016 Danish-Swedish drama film directed by Johannes Nyholm. It was selected to be screened in the Discovery section at the 2016 Toronto International Film Festival. At the 52nd Guldbagge Awards the film won three Guldbagge Awards, Best Film, Best Screenplay and Makeup and Hair.

== Plot summary ==
Rikard, a 30-year-old man with a severe facial deformity and autism, has spent much of his life isolated in a care home. Despite his circumstances, he finds solace and purpose in the game of pétanque, where he shows surprising talent. Rikard dreams of reconnecting with his estranged mother, who rejected him when he was a child.

Throughout the film, his inner world is portrayed through the recurring vision of a protective giant who symbolizes his longing for acceptance and love. As Rikard pursues success in a national pétanque championship, he also struggles with feelings of abandonment and the hope of reconciliation with his mother. The story blends realism with fantasy, reflecting both the challenges of disability and the resilience of the human spirit.

== Cast ==
- Christian Andrén as Rikard
- Johan Kylén as Roland
- Anna Bjelkerud as Elisabeth
- Linda Faith as Lina
