= A Serious Game =

- Theatrical release poster
- Directed by: Pernilla August
- Screenplay by: Lone Scherfig
- Based on: The Serious Game by Hjalmar Söderberg
- Produced by: Patrik Andersson; Frida Bargo; Fredrik Heinig
- Starring: Karin Franz Körlof; Sverrir Gudnason; Liv Mjönes; Michael Nyqvist; Göran Ragnerstam; Mikkel Boe Følsgaard
- Cinematography: Erik Molberg Hansen
- Edited by: Liv Lynge; Åsa Mossberg; Rasmus Nyholm
- Music by: Matti Bye
- Production company: B-Reel Films
- Distributed by: Nordisk Film
- Release dates: 16 February 2016 (BIFF); 9 September 2016 (Sweden)
- Running time: 115 minutes
- Country: Sweden
- Language: Swedish

A Serious Game (Swedish: Den allvarsamma leken) is a 2016 Swedish romantic drama film directed by Pernilla August, based on the novel The Serious Game by Hjalmar Söderberg.

== Plot ==
Arvid Stjärnblom, an aspiring journalist from Värmland, working as a proofreader for a daily newspaper in Stockholm, falls head over heels in love with Lydia Stille, a painter's daughter. With his low income, he doesn't think he could provide Lydia with an appropriate lifestyle. Rather than waiting for him, she chooses to marry the wealthy but much older landowner Markus Roslin. Years later, Arvid is married as well, and both couples have a daughter. When Arvid and Lydia see each other again, neither can overcome their mutual attraction. They begin a passionate affair, which greatly afflicts their loved ones, leading to dramatic events.

== Cast ==
- Sverrir Gudnason as Arvid Stjärnblom
- Karin Franz Körlof as Lydia Stille
- Michael Nyqvist as chief editor Markel
- Mikkel Boe Følsgaard as Carl Lidner
- Liv Mjönes as Dagmar Stjärnblom, née Randel
- Göran Ragnerstam as Anders Stille
- Sven Nordin as Markus Roslin
- Staffan Göthe as Arvid's father
- Alva Hellenius as Marianne
- Liva Östervall as Anne Marie
