= Karin Franz Körlof =

Swedish actress, playwright and director (born 1986)

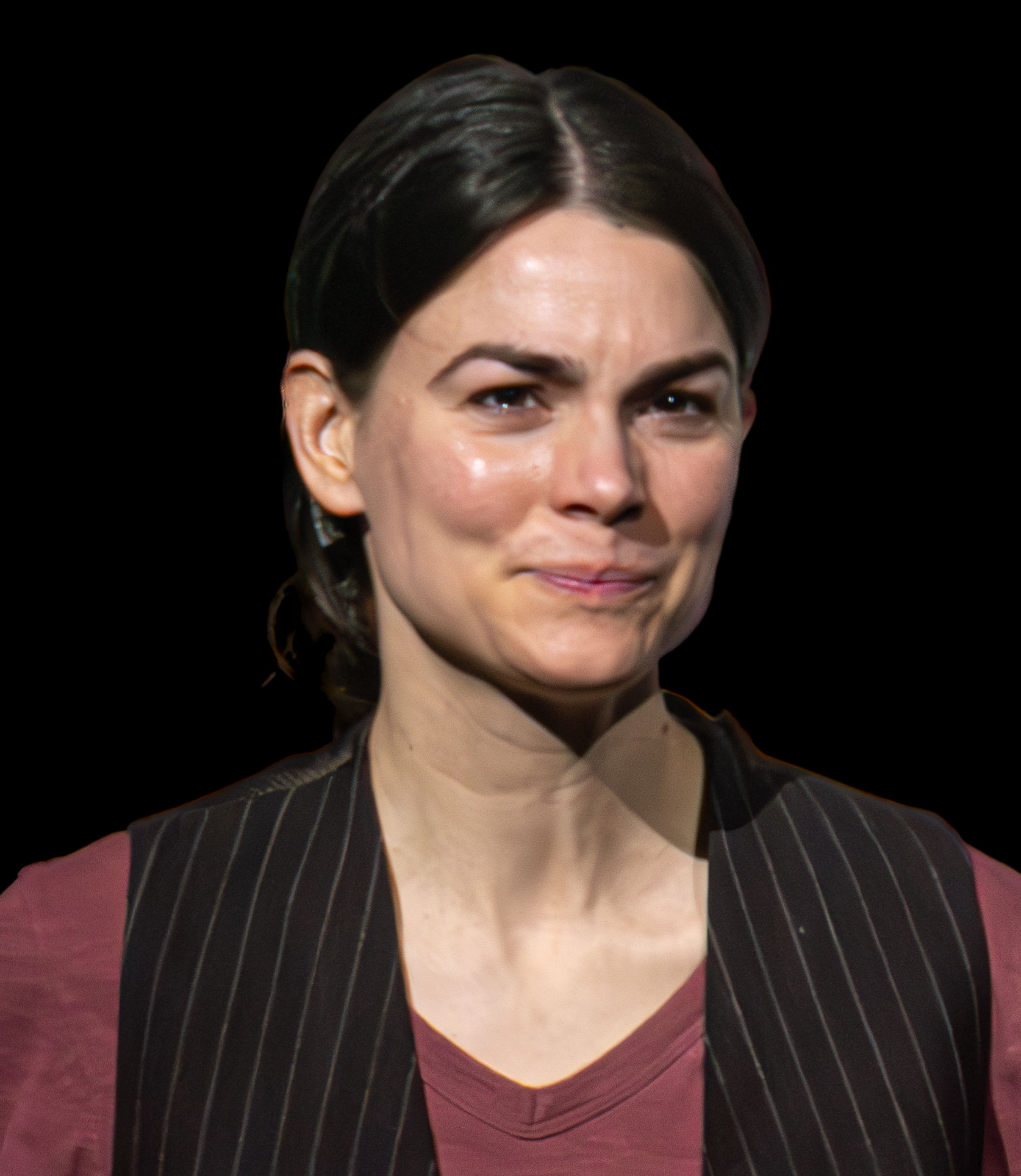
- Karin Franz Körlof in 2024
- Born: Karin Fransén Körlof; 18 April 1986 (age 40); Ytterby, Bohuslän, Sweden
- Occupations: actress, playwright, director
- Years active: 2000-present

Karin Franz Körlof (born Fransén Körlof, 18 April 1986) is a Swedish actress, playwright and director.

== Biography ==
Körlof is the daughter of Anders Körlof and Anica Fransén, and the grandchild of lawyer Voldmar Körlof. She grew up in the Ytterby area in Kungälv and came into contact with acting when she was 14, when she got one of the main roles in the anti-drug film Brandstegen. In 2002–05 she participated in theater and film production at the Ale gymnasium. From 2005 to 2007 she continued with a basic education (HNC) in acting and theater science at Dundee and Angus College, The Space, in Scotland, where she played in classics such as Shakespeare's As You Like It (Rosalind) and Oscar Wilde's The Importance of Being Earnest (as Lady Bracknell). She also appeared in the short film End of Patrick Bullet, filmed in Gothenburg. In 2009–10 she studied theater at Stockholm University, then acting at Stockholm Academy of Dramatic Arts in 2012–15.

== Selected filmography ==
- The Crown Jewels (2011) as girl by the church
- Wallander (2013) as Alexia (1 episode)
- Nobody Owns Me (2013) as Maja (20 years old)
- Blue Eyes (2014–15) as Sofia Nilsson (10 episodes)
- A Serious Game (2016) as Lydia Stille
- The Wife (2017) as Linnea
- Vår tid är nu (2017) as Lilly (10 episodes)
- Greyzone (2018) as Linda Laaksonen (7 episodes)

== Awards ==
- Berlin International Film Festival: EFP Shooting Star (2017)
