= Marked bill =

Technique to trace money used in illegal activities

Marking bills is a technique used by police to trace and identify money used in illegal activities. The serial numbers of the bills are recorded, and sometimes markings are made on the bank notes themselves (such as with a highlighter or other writing).

Non-law enforcement uses of marking bills may be as simple as distinctive text on the bank notes, or recording serial numbers in the event of a robbery.
