= Rune Andréasson =

Swedish cartoonist (1925–1999)

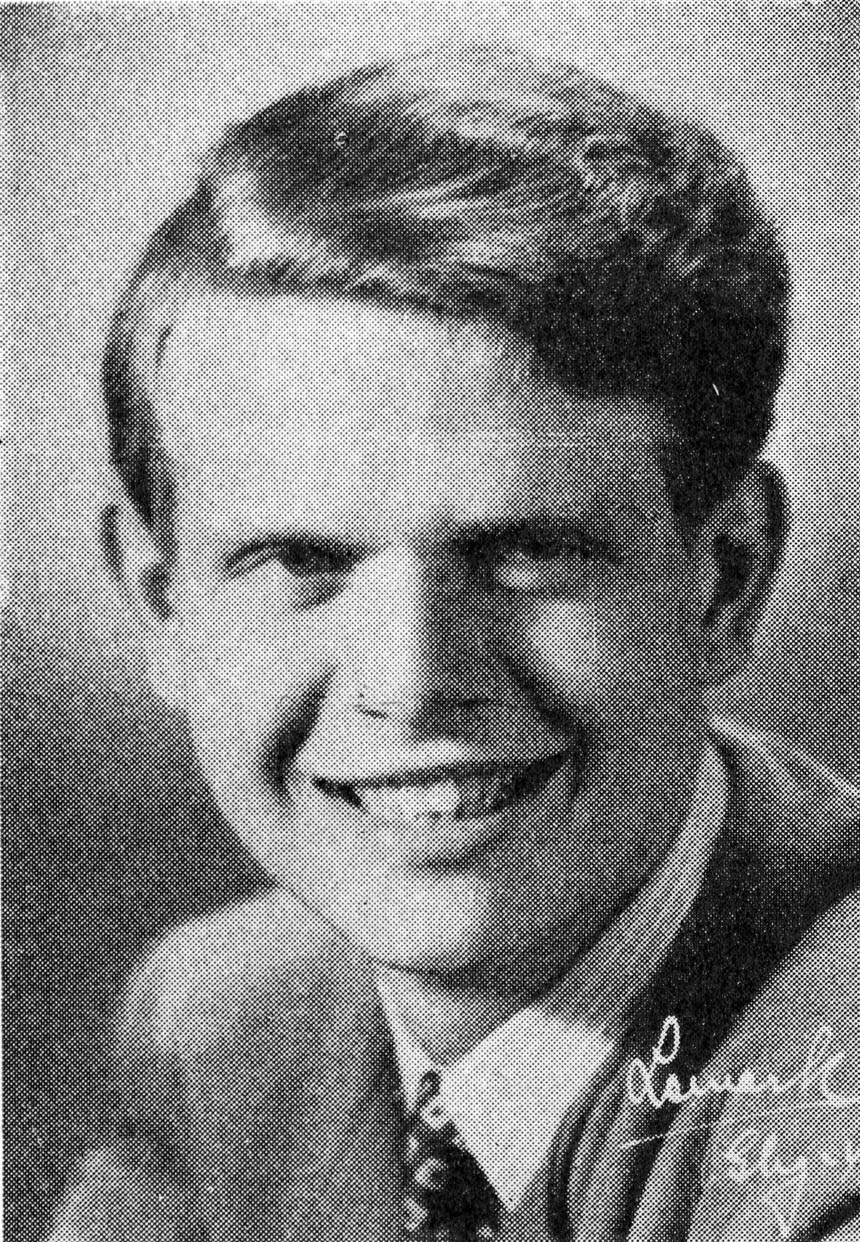
- Ca. 1947
- Born: Rune Herbert Emanuel Andréasson; 11 August 1925 Lindome, Sweden
- Died: 15 December 1999 (aged 74) Viken, Sweden
- Areas: Writer, Artist, Editor
- Notable works: Bamse, Brum, Pellefant, etc.

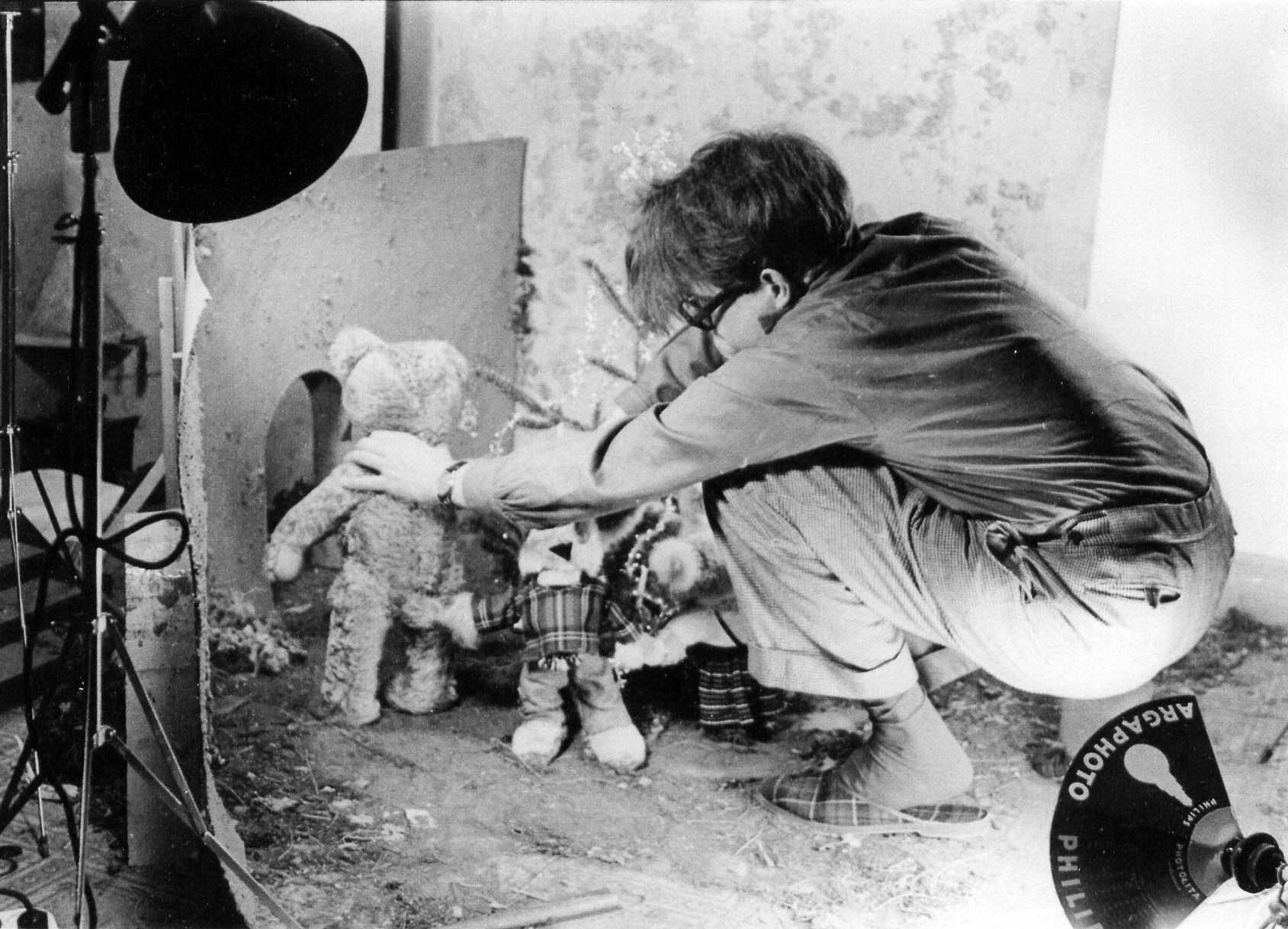
Still from the production of Rune Andréasson's animated TV series "Nalle ritar och berättar" (1950s), Gothenburg.

Rune Herbert Emanuel Andréasson (11 August 1925 – 15 December 1999) was a Swedish cartoonist and illustrator.

Andréasson began creating children's comics in 1944, mainly for the Swedish market, but his works have been published in several languages. He created mostly his own, original characters and features, which included the comic features "Brum", "Lille Rikard och Hans Katt" (Little Rikard and his cat), "Rulle och Maja" (Rulle and Maja), "Nicke Bock" (Nicke goat), "Åsnan Kal" (Kal the donkey), "Nalle Ritar och Berättar" (Nalle draws and tells), "Teddy", "Habibu" and "Pellefant".

In the late 40's, he had a few bit parts in movies, most notably in Ingmar Bergman's Music in Darkness. A later Bergman collaboration was animating a short sequence in Summer Interlude.

His most famous creation, however, is "Bamse", created in the 1960s, an often educational comic featuring "the world's strongest bear". This feature was highly successful, and was followed by several animated cartoons, as well as a comic book. The comic book started in 1973, featured exclusively Swedish material, and is still one of Sweden's most popular comic books today.

In the 1970s, Andréasson began contracting other artists to do the artwork, while he still wrote the stories and kept a strict editorial control of the contents. For example, he refused to publish commercial ads in a magazine aimed at children. He was also rather restrictive with using his creations for commercial merchandising (sans for a few exceptional cases).

He retired in 1990, and left his comic to the publishing house Egmont.

== Family ==
Andreasson's wife Majvor Lundström who now is the CEO of the Bamseförlaget AB and followed by her Ola and Dan Andreasson who run the company along with her. Majvor and Rune had four children together Dan, Ola, Pål and adopted Viktoria Andreasson. They also have seven grandchildren Anna, Tom, John, Felicia, Moa, Liyah and Lucas

Rune Andréasson died 15 December 1999 of cancer.
