= Patrik, Age 1.5 =

- Theatrical release poster
- Directed by: Ella Lemhagen
- Screenplay by: Ella Lemhagen
- Story by: Michael Druker
- Produced by: Tomas Michaelsson
- Starring: Gustaf Skarsgård; Torkel Petersson; Tom Ljungman
- Cinematography: Marek Septimus Weiser
- Edited by: Thomas Lagerman
- Music by: Fredrik Emilson
- Production company: Filmlance International AB
- Distributed by: Sonet Film (Sweden); Regent Releasing here! Films (US)
- Release dates: 6 September 2008 (Toronto International Film Festival); 12 September 2008 (Sweden)
- Running time: 102 minutes
- Country: Sweden
- Language: Swedish
- Box office: $3,251,706

Patrik, Age 1.5 (Swedish: Patrik 1,5) is a 2008 Swedish comedy–drama film in which a gay Swedish couple adopt what they at first believe to be a baby, Patrik, only to have him turn out to be a homophobic teenager.

== Plot ==
The film chronicles the experience of a gay Swedish couple, Sven (Torkel Petersson) and Göran Skoogh (Gustaf Skarsgård) as they move into a new suburban neighborhood and adopt a child, beginning with their welcoming party. After meeting their new neighbors and settling into their jobs, they decide to adopt a child. Although they are married, no country is willing to let a gay couple adopt any of its children. After they're initially turned down by the adoption agency, a Swedish orphan becomes available, whom they readily agree to adopt. However, a typographical error on the papers changed the child's age from "15" to "1.5". When their new son Patrik (Tom Ljungman) arrives, they are shocked to find him a troubled teenager with a criminal background.

Hurrying to the adoption agency to rectify the error, they arrive to find there is nothing that can be done until the next week. Over the next few days, Sven is appalled by Patrik's insulting behavior, even though Göran sees the good in him. Patrik is initially fearful of both men, believing stereotypes that gays are pedophiles. Once the agency reopens, all three are told by the officials that Patrik's only options are living with them or returning to the foster center where he came from. After living up to his troublemaking habits, Patrik causes Sven to leave in disgust over Göran's unwillingness to kick Patrik out. Göran agrees to look after Patrik until the agency can find a suitable home for him. Over the next few days, Patrik reveals his talent for gardening, and Göran grows to accept him.

After several weeks, the agency notifies Göran that a family has been found for Patrik, who by this time has gotten past his initial fear and contempt for his surrogate parents. Sven returns as he and Göran both realize their issues were not worth ending their relationship. Patrik's new father arrives to pick him up, and he leaves with him. After a short time, Patrik returns, and the three then live together permanently.

== Cast ==
- Gustaf Skarsgård as Göran Skoogh
- Torkel Petersson as Sven Skoogh
- Tom Ljungman as Patrik
- Anders Lönnbro as Urban Adler
- Annika Hallin as Eva
- Jacob Ericksson as Lennart Ljung

== Release ==
The film was shown at the 2008 Toronto International Film Festival and the 2009 London Lesbian and Gay Film Festival. It was screened to a sold-out cinema at the Seattle International Film Festival for the festival's annual "Gay-la" event. It is the opening night film at the 2009 Inside Out Film and Video Festival, and was a centerpiece film for Frameline in San Francisco in June 2009. It was the closing film at the Dublin Gay and Lesbian Film Festival (GAZE) in August 2009 and at the Glasgay! Film Festival in October 2009. Also screened at the Hong Kong Lesbian and Gay Film Festival and the Rehoboth Beach Film Festival (where it placed 3rd for Best Feature) in November 2009, and at the 25th Gay and Lesbian Film Festival in Ljubljana, Slovenia, in early December 2009, where a discussion was held with director Ella Lemhagen after the sold-out (closing) screening at the Slovenian Cinematheque.

== Production ==
Patrik, Age 1.5 is technically based on a stage production; however, director Ella Lemhagen didn't like the script of the play all that much, and decided to just use the film's pitch and to build up a new story from scratch. While doing so, she interviewed the first Swedish gay couple given permission to adopt, in 2003, and who by 2010 were still waiting to actually adopt.

== Reception ==
The film received generally positive reviews from critics. Based on 17 reviews, it holds a 71% "Fresh" rating on Rotten Tomatoes. Jeanette Causulis from The New York Times said in her review that "Deftly combining low-key romance and gentle humor, the director, Ella Lemhagen (working from Michael Druker's 2008 play), stares down prejudice with a nudge and a wink rather than a soapbox."

Kevin Thomas from the Los Angeles Times wrote "This most observant and involving film has three strengths: It shows that a strongly family-oriented, middle-class suburbia is initially hardly idyllic for gays; the arrival of Patrik reveals fissures in Sven and Goran’s relationship; and that Lemhagen, who plays against predictability at every turn, maintains suspense right up to the final minutes as to how everything may turn out for the three." Chuck Wilson from The Village Voice wrote “One is never bored, thanks to the innate charms of Gustaf Skarsgård and young Ljungman.”

== Sources ==
- Review by Brent Hartinger in AfterElton: "If You See Only One Gay Indie Movie This Year, Make It Patrik, Age 1.5"
