= Liv Mjönes =

Swedish actress (born 1979)

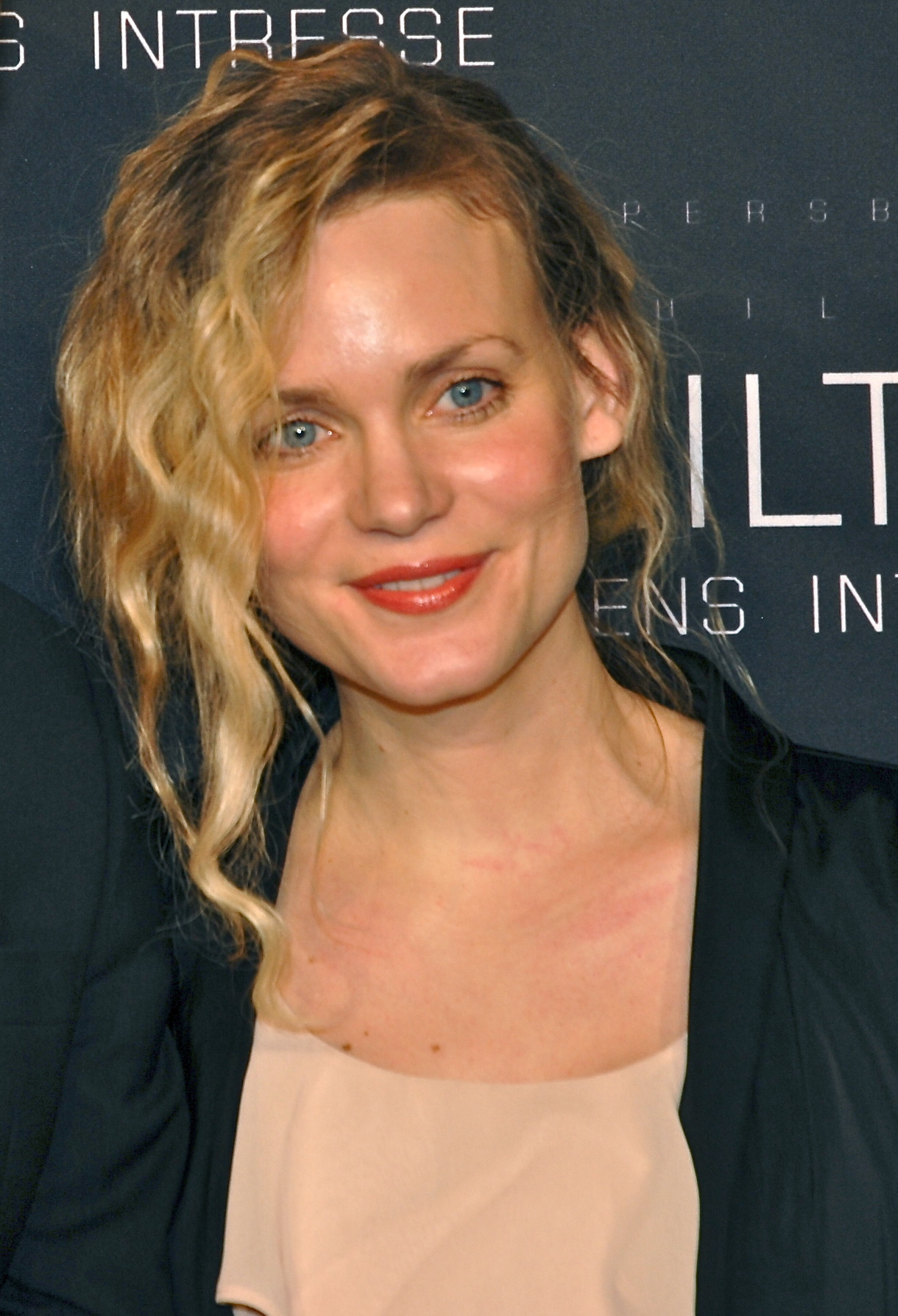
- Mjönes in 2012
- Born: Liv Anna Mjönes; September 18, 1979 (age 46); Kista, Stockholm, Sweden
- Occupations: Actress; dancer
- Years active: 2000–present
- Children: 2

Liv Anna Mjönes (born 18 September 1979) is a Swedish actress. She is best known for her role in the 2011 lesbian romance With Every Heartbeat (Swedish: Kyss mig, lit. 'Kiss me'). For this film, she received critical praise and was nominated for a Guldbagge Award for Best Actress in a Supporting Role. She has also had roles in television series such as Sthlm Requiem (2018) and The Lawyer (2018–2020).

== Early life and education ==
Liv Anna Mjönes was born on 18 September 1979 in Kista, a district of Stockholm, Sweden.

In 1995, at the age of 16, she started studying dancing and acting. She graduated from the Stockholm Academy of Dramatic Arts in 2006.

== Career ==
Mjönes had her breakthrough in Alexandra-Therese Keining's 2011 lesbian romance film With Every Heartbeat (Swedish: Kyss mig, lit. 'Kiss me'). For her role as Frida, she was nominated for a Guldbagge Award for Best Actress in a Supporting Role. She and her co-star Ruth Vega Fernandez both received praise for their performances by Mats Johnson in Göteborgs-Posten.

In 2008, she played Dagmar in a Daniel Lind Lagerlöf-directed stage production of The Serious Game at Stockholm City Theatre. She then had roles in Stockholm East (2011) and Hamilton: In the Interest of the Nation (2012).

In 2018, Mjönes played the lead role of Fredrika Bergman in Sthlm Requiem, a crime series adapted from novels by Kristina Ohlsson. She also appeared in The Lawyer (2018–2020).

She had a minor part in the American-Swedish horror film Midsommar (2019). She played Carro, a single woman considering having children with her gay friend, in the 2020 comedy series Amningsrummet. She had a supporting role in the comedy film En dag kommer allt det här bli ditt (2020).

In 2022, she had her first role in an international television series, The Holiday. That same year, she was featured in Tack för senast (2022), for which she was a Guldbagge nomination.

In 2023, she was featured in the Swedish-Spanish series This Is Not Sweden.

For Så länge hjärtat slår (2024), she received another Guldbagge nomination for Best Actress in a Supporting Role.

== Personal life ==
She has two sons.

== Filmography ==
=== Film ===
Year	Title	Role	Notes
2002	Vexator	Veronika	TV movie
2003	Miffo	Jenny Maria Brunander	
2005	Close to the Skin	Tova	Short Film
2006	Isola	Helen	Short Film
2006	En uppstoppad hund	Nelly	TV movie
2006	Before You Hit the Ground	Nora	Short Film
2009	Vägen hem	Barnflickan Sara Svensson	
2009	Melvin	Pucko	Short Film
2011	With Every Heartbeat	Frida	Nominated Best Supporting Actress 2012
2011	Stockholm East	Kattis	
2012	Hamilton: In the Interest of the Nation	Johanna Runestam	Most successful Swedish film in 2012
2012	Elsa & tandfen	Tooth Fairy	Short Film
2013	A Last Farewell	Malin	Short Film
2015	Tsatsiki Farsan och Olivkriget	Lotta	
2019	Midsommar	Ulla	
2022	Vikingulven	Liv Berg	
2022	Tack för senast	Ullis	Nominated Best Supporting Actress 2023
2023	En dag kommer allt det här bli ditt	Josefine	
2024	Så länge hjärtat slår	Katrin	Nominated Best Supporting Actress 2025

=== Television ===
Year	Title	Role	Notes
2005	Coachen	Banktjänsteman	1 Episode
2008 & 2010	Hotell Kantarell	Den nya & Viola	2 Episodes
2009	The Half Hidden	Alice	2 Episodes
2009	Oskyldigt dömd	Monica Johansson	1 Episode
2011	Drottningoffret	Jenny	2 Episodes
2011	Bibliotekstjuven	Pia	3 Episodes
2011	Anno 1790	Elouise Espersen	1 Episode
2012	Solsidan	Susanne	1 Episode
2013	Wallander	Helen Svedberg	1 Episode
2013	Crimes of Passion		1 Episode
2015	Modus	Patricia Green	Series regular
2018	Sthlm Requiem	Fredrika Bergman	Lead role
2020	Amningsrummet	Carro	Lead role
2022	The Holiday	Jenny	Lead Role
2023	This Is Not Sweden	Annika	Series regular
2023	Blackwater	Barbro Torbjörnsson	

== Theatre ==
Year	Title	Role	Venue
2001	Mad	Claire	Teater Tribunalen
2003	Demoner	Katarina	Teaterhögskolan
2003	Tre Systrar	Masja	Teaterhögskolan
2005	Stormen	Miranda	Stockholm City Theatre
2005	En Midsommarnattsdröm	Helena	Teaterhögskolan
2006	Grodorna	Moren	Barndomsprojektet
2006	Miss Kollo	Line, monolog	Stockholm City Theatre
2006	Grüß Gott	Grete	Teaterhögskolan
2007	Ingenstans	Klara	Sörmlands Musik Teater
2007	Alexander och påfågeln	lærerinnen / redselen	Royal Dramatic Theatre
2007	Kväljningsreflexen	Unn	Dramalabbet
2008	The Serious Game	Dagmar	Stockholm City Theatre
