= Ella Lemhagen =

Swedish film director and screenwriter (born 1965)

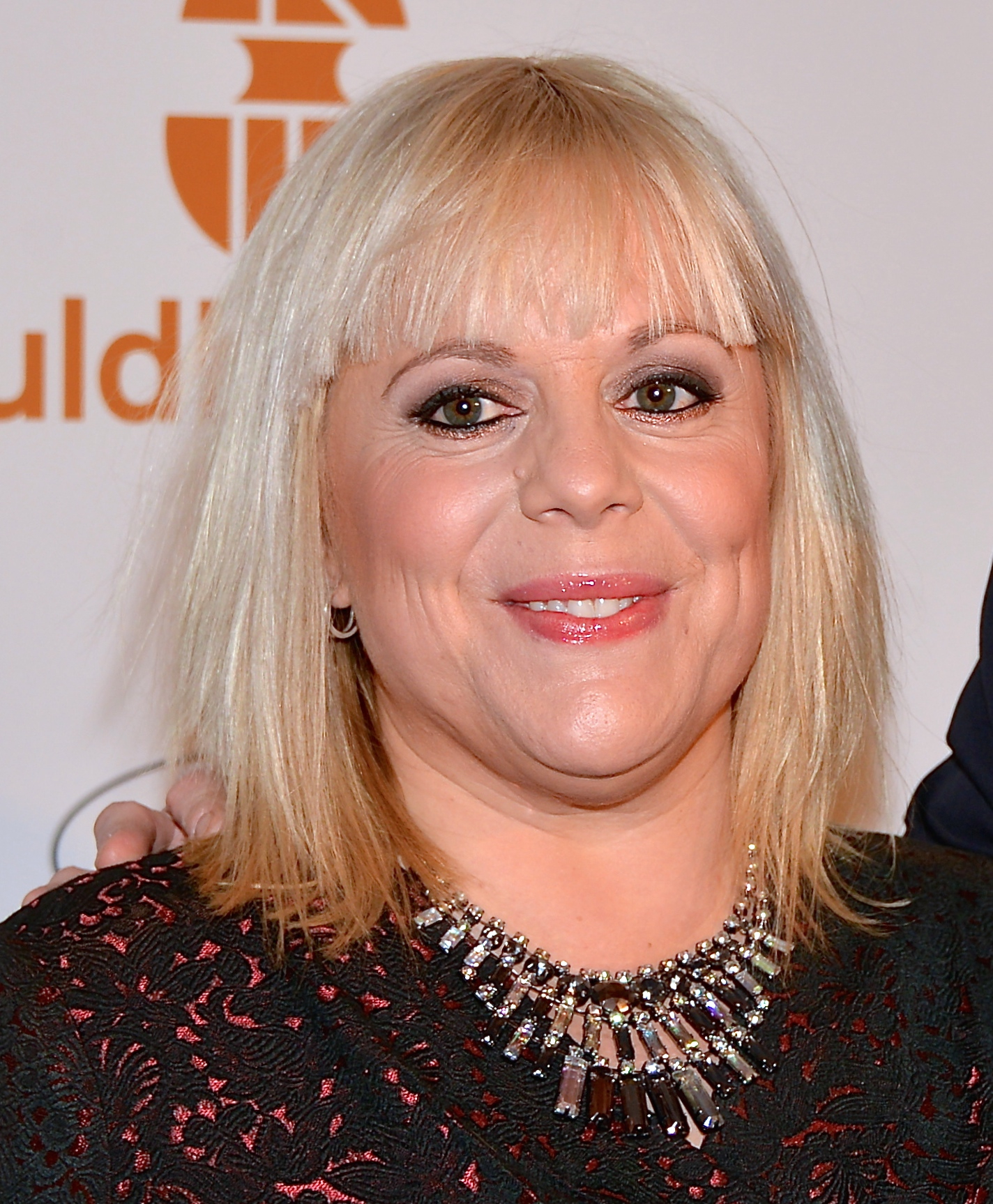
- Lemhagen at the 2013 Guldbagge Award.
- Born: Ella Elisabet Lemhagen; 29 August 1965 (age 59); Uppsala, Sweden
- Occupation(s): Film director, screenwriter
- Years active: 1992–present
- Children: 3

Ella Elisabet Lemhagen (born 29 August 1965) is a Swedish film director and screenwriter. In 2013 she received the honorary award, Gullspira, for her outstanding work in youth culture, in the Guldbagge Award, awarded by the Swedish Film Institute.

== Early life ==
Ella Elisabet Lemhagen was born on 29 August 1965 in Uppsala. She went to Dramatiska Institutets director's program from 1988 to 1991.

== Career ==
Lemhagen's first full-length film was Drömprinsen- filmen om Em which premiered in Swedish cinemas in February 1996. It's about a young girl, Em, who one day sees her playhouse burn down. By accident her gaze meets the eyes of the one responsible for the fire whom she later runs into and a new, different friendship begins.

The movie that primarily made Lemhagen known to the public is Tsatsiki, morsan och polisen. It is based on two books written by Moni Nilsson-Brännström called Tsatsiki och morsan and Tsatsiki och farsan. The movie is about an eight-year-old boy who lives with his single mom, his father lives in Greece. Tsatsiki dreams about going there and meet him. He tries to set up his mother with a police who lives in their house but she is not interested. One day Tsatsiki travels to Greece and there he meets his father for the first time.

During the beginning of the 21st century came her big break as a film director for films targeted at adults, not just adolescents. In 2008 she directed a movie called Patrik 1,5 which is about a gay couple who just moved to the suburbs where they bought a house. They are about to adopt a kid called Patrik who is one and half years old. Something goes wrong with the adoption agency and the kid they get to adopt is Patrik who is 15 years old and has a troubled background. It's about the struggle you face as a parent raising a troublesome teenager and their own struggle as a gay couple trying to live a “normal” life.

Pojken med guldbyxorna was released in 2014. It is a remake of the book of the same title by Max Lundgren. It is about a boy who gets his hands on a pair of golden pants which gives him an unlimited amount of money.

== Personal life ==
She and her husband have three children.

== Awards and nominations ==
- 2013: Gullspira, for her outstanding work in youth culture
- 2000: Starboy Award for the best children's film at Oulu International Children's and Youth Film Festival, for Tsatsiki, morsan och polisen
- 2000: Winner, Guldbagge Award for Best Director, for Tsatsiki, morsan och polisen
- 1997: Nominated, Guldbagge Award for Best Director, for Drömprinsen- filmen om Em
- 1996: Kurt Linder Scholarship, Drömprinsen- filmen om Em

== Filmography ==
- 2019 - Jag kommer hem igen till jul
- 2016 - All Roads Lead to Rome
- 2014 - Pojken med guldbyxorna
- 2011 - Kronjuvelerna
- 2008 - Patrik, 1.5
- 2003 - Tur & retur
- 2003 - Järnvägshotellet
- 2001 - Om inte
- 1999 - Tsatsiki, morsan och polisen
- 1997 - Välkommen till festen
- 1996 - Drömprinsen – Filmen om Em
