= Stockholm East (film) =

- Stockholm Östra
- Directed by: Simon Kaijser
- Release date: 2011
- Country: Sweden

Stockholm East (Swedish: Stockholm Östra) is a Swedish drama film, released in 2011 and directed by Simon Kaijser.

== Plot ==
Stockholm East is the love story between two strangers, bound together by a tragedy that has taken its toll on both their lives and relationships. They meet and begin a passionate relationship, while both of them hide an inconvenient truth from the other. The story starts with Johan (Persbrandt) accidentally hitting nine-year-old Tove, daughter of Anna (Iben Hjejle), with his car, and killing her. Both adult characters have a hard time moving on with their life, and their relationships with their SOs suffer. About a year later, the two of them meet by chance. Johan knows who Anna is, but Anna doesn't know who Johan is - she is simply grateful to have someone in her life who she can talk to about Tove, pretending that her daughter is still alive. Slowly, they fall in love.

== Cast ==
- Mikael Persbrandt - Johan
- Iben Hjejle - Anna
- Liv Mjönes - Kattis
- Henrik Norlén - Anders
- Astrid Assefa - Nurse
- Lars-Erik Berenett - Kattis Dad
- Moa Zetterlund - Minna
- Jimmy Lindström - Minnas Dad
- Rebecca Englund - new mom
- Ulf Friberg - new father
- Anna Godenius - Prosecutor
- Annika Hallin - Remembering Mom
- Peter Parkrud - Therapist
- Fredrik Nilsson - The guy in the tunnel
