= Michael Niavarani =

Austrian-Persian stand-up comedian

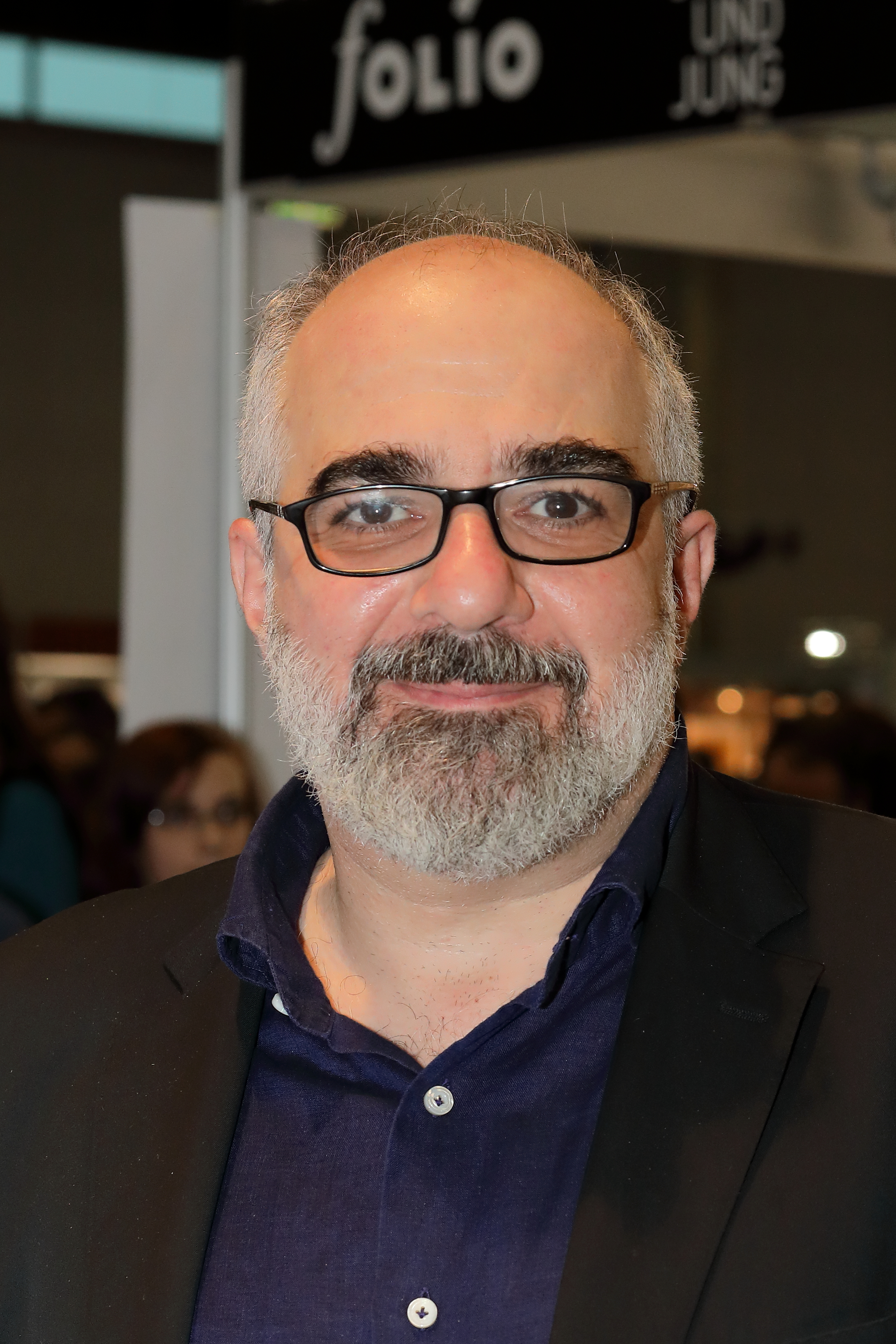
- Niavarani in 2018
- Born: April 29, 1968 (age 58); Vienna, Austria
- Website: www.niavarani.at

Michael Niavarani (born April 29, 1968) is an Austrian-Persian stand-up comedian in the tradition of Austrian cabaret, an author, and a television and movie actor. Niavarani, whose comedic work often draws on his inter-cultural upbringing, is a central figure of the Austrian cabaret scene. Since 1992, he has been director of the Kabarett Simpl, a Viennese cabaret that opened in 1912. In 2010, Niavarani won the Austrian Kabarett Award. He is also a three-time winner of the Romy award.

== Books ==
- Julia Sobieszek, Michael Niavarani (2007), Zum Lachen in den Keller, Vienna: Amalthea Signum, ISBN 3-85002-610-8
- Michael Niavarani (2009), Vater Morgana: Eine persische Familiengeschichte, Vienna: Amalthea Signum, ISBN 3-85002-689-2
