= Shebly Niavarani =

Swedish actor (born 1979)

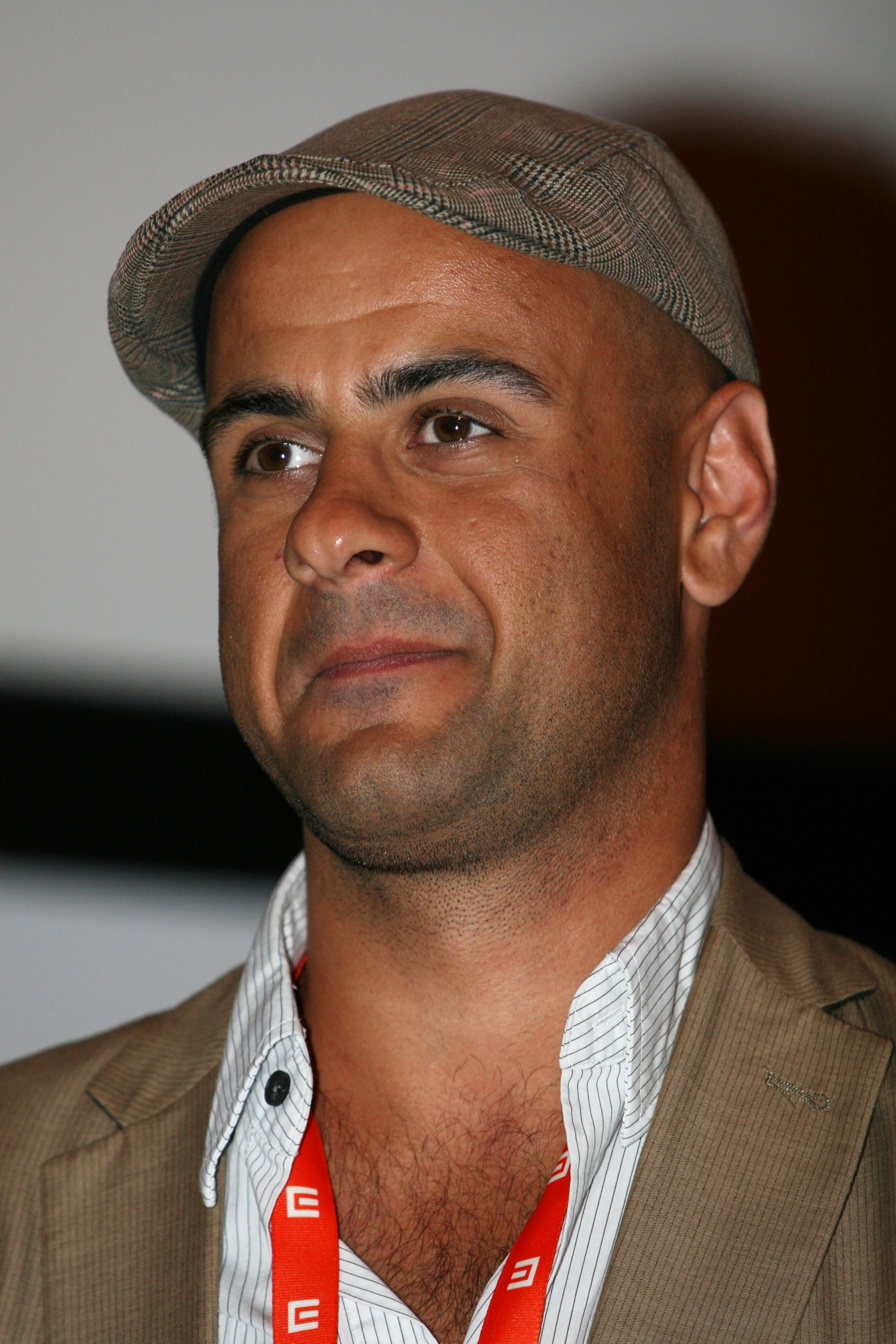
- Born: 7 July 1979 (age 47); Tehran, Iran
- Occupation: Actor

Shebly Niavarani (Note: Persian: شبلی نیاورانی) (born 7 July 1979) is a Swedish actor of Persian descent. He studied acting at the National Academy of performing arts between years 2000-2004. He is a member of the Stockholm City Theatre ensemble where he has played in such productions as INVASION by Jonas Hassen Khemiri, Guantanamo directed by Eva Bergman, The Jungelbook directed by Alexander Mørk-Eidem, Who's afraid of Virginia Woolf directed by Sofia Jupiter, War and Peace directed by Carolina Frände.

Film and Television: One Eye Red (Ett öga rött), The Swimsuit Issue (Allt flyter) Wallander, The Case (Fallet), Julkalendern including Superhjältejul. Arne Dahl Evil Blood, Real Humans (Äkta människor) and Johan Falk 2.

He also worked at Folkteatern i Gothenburg where the Swedish playwright and director Lars Norén was artistic leader.

He is also a member and co founder of the independent film company LITTLE BIG DOG. He is the brother of actor and artist Shima Niavarani and cousin of the Austrian comedian, actor Michael Niavarani.
