= Alexandra-Therese Keining =

Swedish filmmaker (born 1976)

- Born: 1976 (age 48–49); Lomma, Sweden
- Occupations: Director; screenwriter; novelist
- Years active: 2002–present

Alexandra-Therese Keining (born 1976) is a Swedish director and writer. She is known for directing LGBTQ-related films such as With Every Heartbeat and Girls Lost.

== Early life and education ==
She was born in 1976 in Lomma, and was raised in Malmö. She graduated with a film degree in Los Angeles.

== Career ==
She made her debut in film with Hot Dog, released in 2002. A young woman moves from Stockholm to Malmö and becomes involved with a young Danish man.

In 2011, Keining began directing With Every Heartbeat (Swedish: Kyss Mig). It revolves around Mia's affair with Frida, as their parents will soon be married. She made her debut as a young adult novelist in 2014 with 14.

Girls Lost was screened 2015 Toronto International Film Festival in Toronto. It was inspired by Virginia Woolf's 1928 novel Orlando: A Biography.

== Awards ==
- With Every Heartbeat won the "Breakthrough Award" at the 2011 AFI Festival. It was also accepted by Autostraddle as one of "8 Pretty Great Lesbian Movies You Haven't Seen Yet.".
