= Ia Langhammer =

Swedish actress (born 1962)

Maria Christina "Ia" Langhammer (born 13 August 1962 in Stockholm) is a Swedish singer and actor.

Langhammer studied at Swedish National Academy of Mime and Acting until 1989. In 1998 she received a Guldbagge Award for her role as Berit in the film Hela härligheten.

She played an overbearing mother-in-law in Thank You, I'm Sorry (2023), for which she was nominated for a Guldbagge Award for Best Supporting Actress.

== Selected filmography ==
- 1993 – Härifrån till Kim
- 1999 – Hälsoresan – En smal film av stor vikt
- 1999 – En liten julsaga
- 2000 – Livet är en schlager
- 2000 – Låt stå! (TV)
- 2001 – Jordgubbar med riktig mjölk
- 2003 – Tur & retur
- 2006 – Exit
- 2006 – LasseMajas detektivbyrå (TV series)
- 2007 – Beck – Det tysta skriket
- 2008 – Allt flyter
- 2008 – Häxdansen (TV)
- 2009 – Flickan
- 2009 – Wallander – Hämnden
- 2009 – De halvt dolda (TV)
- 2012 – Nobel's Last Will
- 2013 – Crimes of Passion (TV)
- 2018 – The Hunters (TV)
- 2023 – Thank You, I'm Sorry
- 2025 – The Glass Dome (TV series)
