= 55th Guldbagge Awards =

Annual Swedish film awards ceremony

- Date: 20 January 2020
- Site: Cirkus, Stockholm
- Hosted by: Emma Molin

Highlights
- Best Picture: And Then We Danced
- Most awards: And Then We Danced & Aniara (4)
- Most nominations: And Then We Danced & The Perfect Patient (7)

Television coverage
- Network: SVT
- Duration: 2 hours

The 55th Guldbagge Awards ceremony, presented by the Swedish Film Institute, honoring the best Swedish films of 2019 and took place on 20 January 2020 at Cirkus in Stockholm. The ceremony was televised by SVT and comedian Emma Molin hosted the ceremony for the second year in a row. The nominees were announced on 8 January 2020.

== Winners and nominees ==
The nominees for the 55th Guldbagge Awards were announced on 8 January 2020 in Stockholm, by the Swedish Film Institute.

=== Awards ===
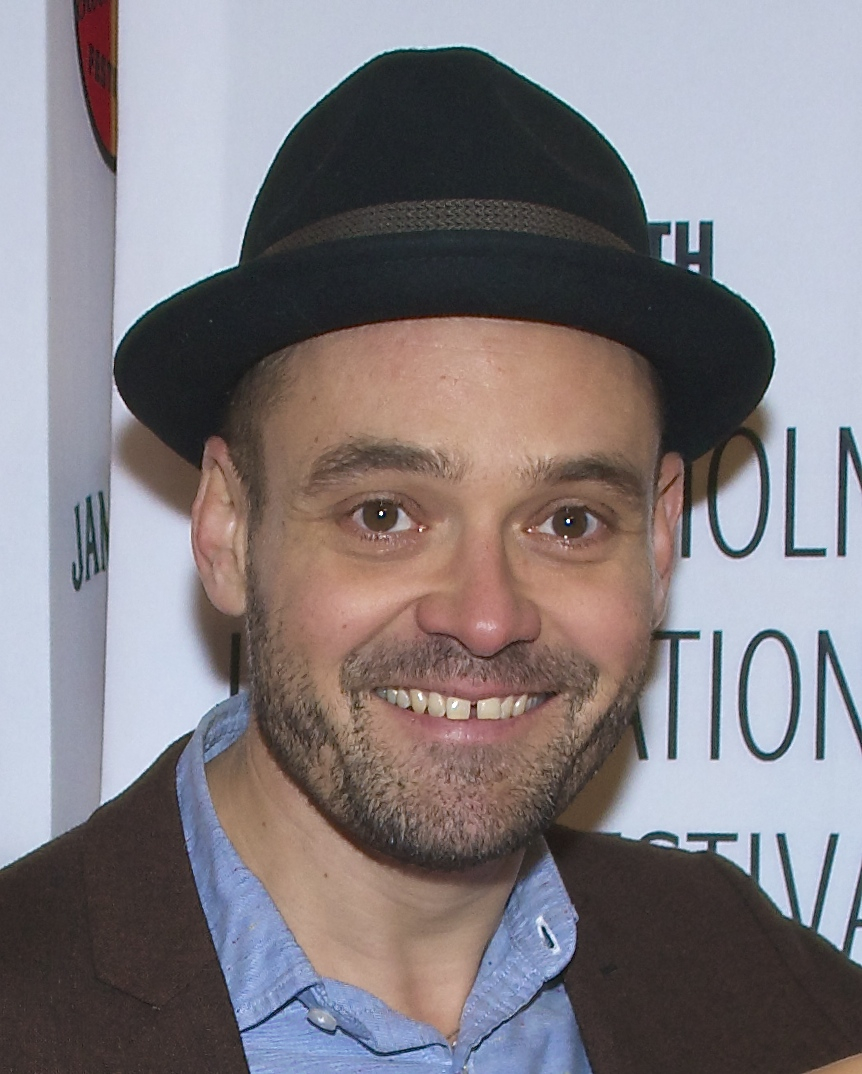
David Dencik, Best Supporting Actor winner

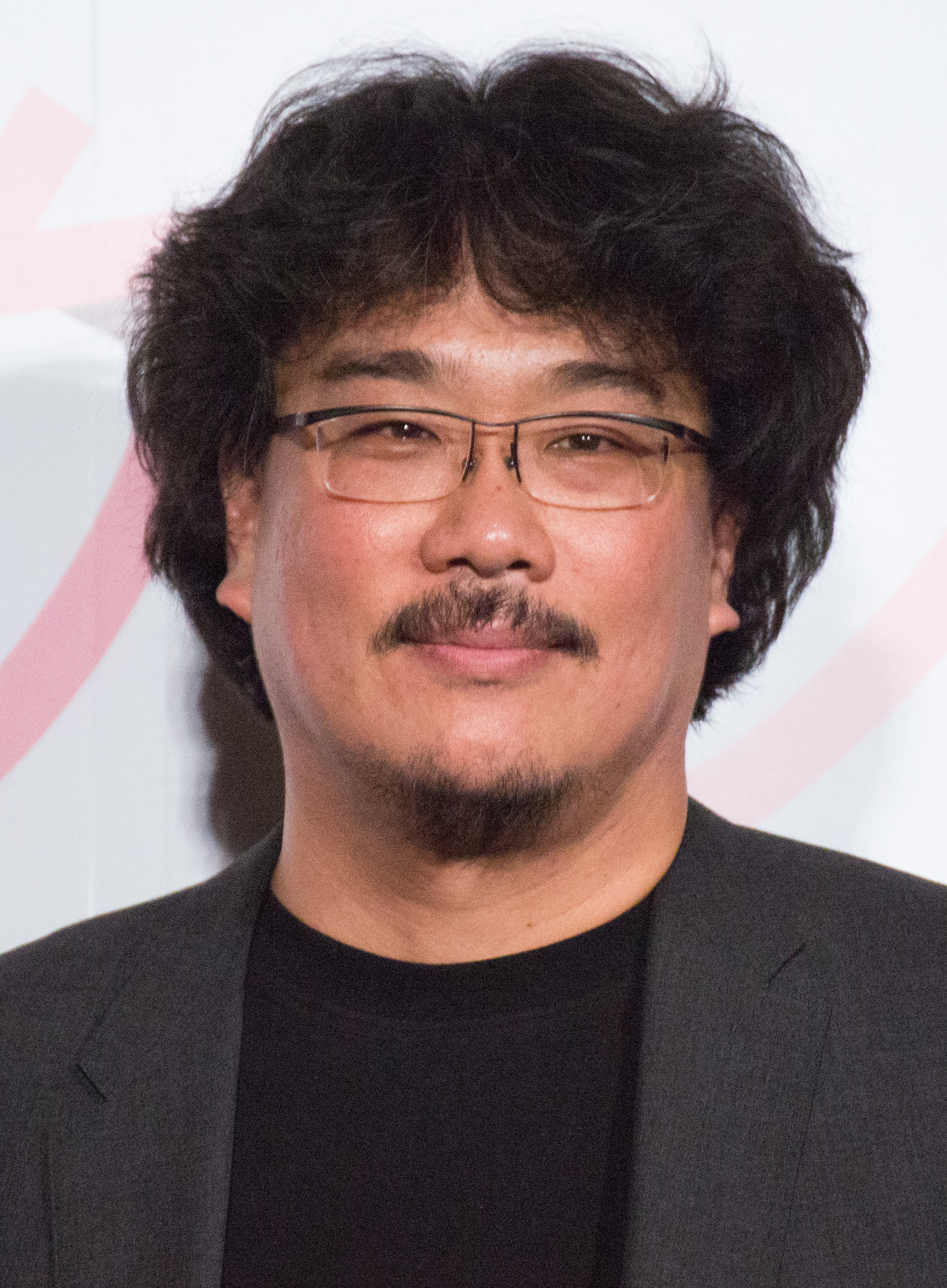
Bong Joon-ho, Best Foreign Film winner

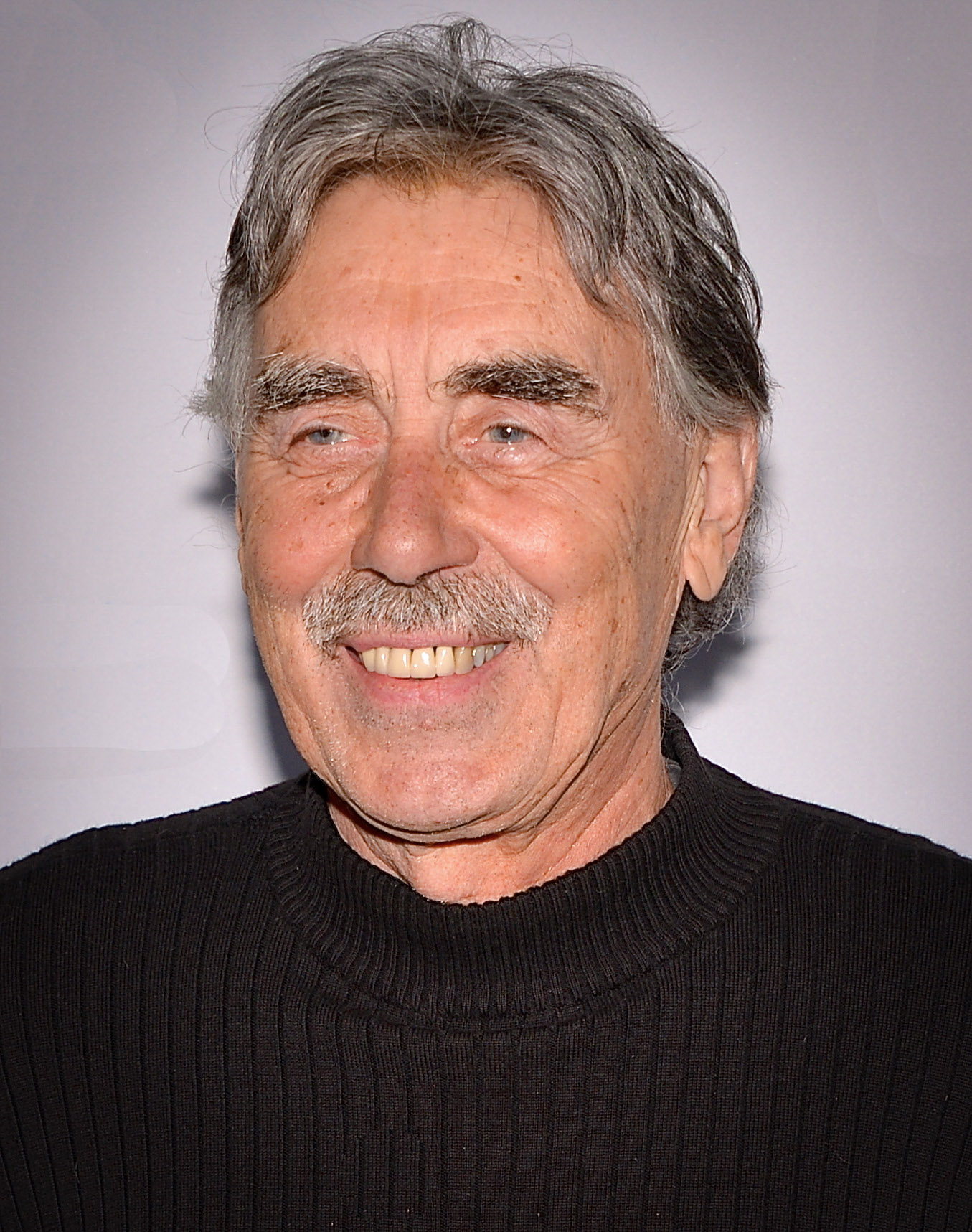
Lasse Åberg, Honorary Award winner

Winners are listed first and highlighted in boldface.

**Best Film**: **And Then We Danced – Levan Akin**; 438 dagar – Jesper Ganslandt; About Endlessness – Roy Andersson; Sune – Best Man – Jon Holmberg; Transnistra – Anna Eborn	**Best Director**: **Hugo Lilja and Pella Kågerman – Aniara**; Levan Akin – And Then We Danced; Roy Andersson – About Endlessness; Jon Holmberg – Sune – Best Man
**Best Actress in a Leading Role**: **Emelie Garbers – Aniara as Mimaroben**; Pernilla August – Britt-Marie Was Here as Britt-Marie; Vigdis Hentze Björck – The Birdcatcher's Son as Johanna; Sanna Sundqvist – Call Mom! as Niki	**Best Actor in a Leading Role**: **Levan Gelbakhiani – And Then We Danced as Merab**; Jonas Karlsson – The Perfect Patient as Hannes Råstam; Johannes Kuhnke – Jag kommer hem igen till jul; Gustaf Skarsgård – 438 dagar as Martin Schibbye; Matias Varela – 438 dagar as Johan Persson
**Best Supporting Actress**: **Bianca Cruzeiro – Aniara as Isagel**; Evin Ahmad – Ring mamma! as Hanna; Alba August – The Perfect Patient as Jenny Küttim; Sissela Benn – Sune – Best Man as Karin	**Best Supporting Actor**: **David Dencik – The Perfect Patient as Thomas Quick / Sture Bergwall**; Ulf Stenberg – Fraemling as Mathias; Bachi Valishvili – And Then We Danced as Irakli; Tomas von Brömssen – Sune – Best Man as Helmer
**Best Screenplay**: **And Then We Danced – Levan Akin**; About Endlessness – Roy Andersson; Call Mom! – Lisa Aschan; The Perfect Patient – Erlend Loe	**Best Cinematography**: **And Then We Danced – Lisabi Fridell**; The Perfect Patient – Ragna Jorming; Swoon – Aril Wretblad
**Best Editing**: **Josefin & Florin – Erika Gonzales, Kristin Grundström, and Karolina Bengtsson**; The Perfect Patient – Rickard Krantz; Transnistra – Anna Eborn	**Best Costume Design**: **Swoon – Margrét Einarsdóttir**; 438 dagar – Clinton Booyse; En del av mitt hjärta – Anna Hagert and Anna Karlsson
**Best Sound Editing**: **438 dagar – Andreas Franck and Fredrik Dalenfjäll**; Jag kommer hem igen till jul – Christian Holm and Niklas Skarp; Josefin & Florin – Claes Lundberg	**Best Makeup and Hair**: **The Perfect Patient – Anna-Carin Lock**; En del av mitt hjärta – Jenny Fred; Swoon – Madeleine Gaterud and Therese Sandersson
**Best Original Score**: **Swoon – Nathaniel Méchaly**; 438 dagar – Jon Ekstrand; Sara med allt sitt väsen – Johan Ramström	**Best Art Direction**: **About Endlessness – Anders Hellström, Frida Ekstrand Elmström, and Nicklas Nilsson**; And Then We Danced – Teo Baramidze; Swoon – Pater Sparrow
**Best Visual Effects**: **Aniara – Andreas Wicklund, Per Jonsson, and Arild Andersson**; 438 dagar – Torbjörn Olsson; Swoon – Bert Deruyck and Kaj Steveman	**Best Documentary Feature**: **Transnistra – Anna Eborn**; Fraemling – Mikel Cee Karlsson; Josefin & Florin – Ellen Fiske and Joanna Karlberg
**Best Shortfilm**: **Excess Will Save Us – Morgane Dziurla-Petit**; Ingen lyssnar – Elin Övergaard; Psychic – Tova Mozard	**Best Foreign Film**: **(South Korea) Parasite – Bong Joon-ho**; (Lebanon) Capernaum – Nadine Labaki; (United States) Marriage Story – Noah Baumbach
**Gullspiran**: **Christian Ryltenius**	**Honorary Award**: **Lasse Åberg – actor, musician, film director, and artist**
**Newcomer Award**: **Emily Norling**	**Audience Award**: **Jag kommer hem igen till jul – Ella Lemhagen**; En del av mitt hjärta – Edward af Sillén; Hasse & Tage – en kärlekshistoria – Jane Magnusson

=== Films with multiple nominations and awards ===
Films that received multiple nominations
Nominations	Film
7	And Then We Danced
7	The Perfect Patient
6	438 dagar
6	Swoon
4	About Endlessness
4	Aniara
4	Sune – Best Man
3	Call Mom!
3	Josefin & Florin
3	Transnistra
2	En del av mitt hjärta
2	Fraemling
2	Jag kommer hem igen till jul

== See also ==
- 92nd Academy Awards
- 77th Golden Globe Awards
- 73rd British Academy Film Awards
- 40th Golden Raspberry Awards
- 35th Independent Spirit Awards
- 31st Producers Guild of America Awards
- 26th Screen Actors Guild Awards
- 25th Critics' Choice Awards
- 24th Satellite Awards
