= Guldbagge Award for Best Actor in a Supporting Role =

Swedish film award

- Country: Sweden
- Presented by: Swedish Film Institute
- First award: 1995 (for acting in films released during the 1995 film season)
- Final award: 2024
- Currently held by: David Fukamachi Regnfors, The Hypnosis (2024)
- Website: guldbaggen.se

The Guldbagge for Best Actor in a Supporting Role is a Swedish film award presented annually by the Swedish Film Institute (SFI) as part of the Guldbagge Awards (Swedish: "Guldbaggen") to actors working in the Swedish motion picture industry.

The categories for Best Supporting Actor and Supporting Actress were first introduced in 1995. In 1992, Ernst Günther received a Guldbagge for Creative Efforts, for his supporting role as Gottfrid in House of Angels.

== Winners and nominees ==
Each Guldbagge Awards ceremony is listed chronologically below along with the winner of the Guldbagge Award for Actor in a Supporting Role and the film associated with the award. In the columns under the winner of each award are the other nominees for best supporting actor.

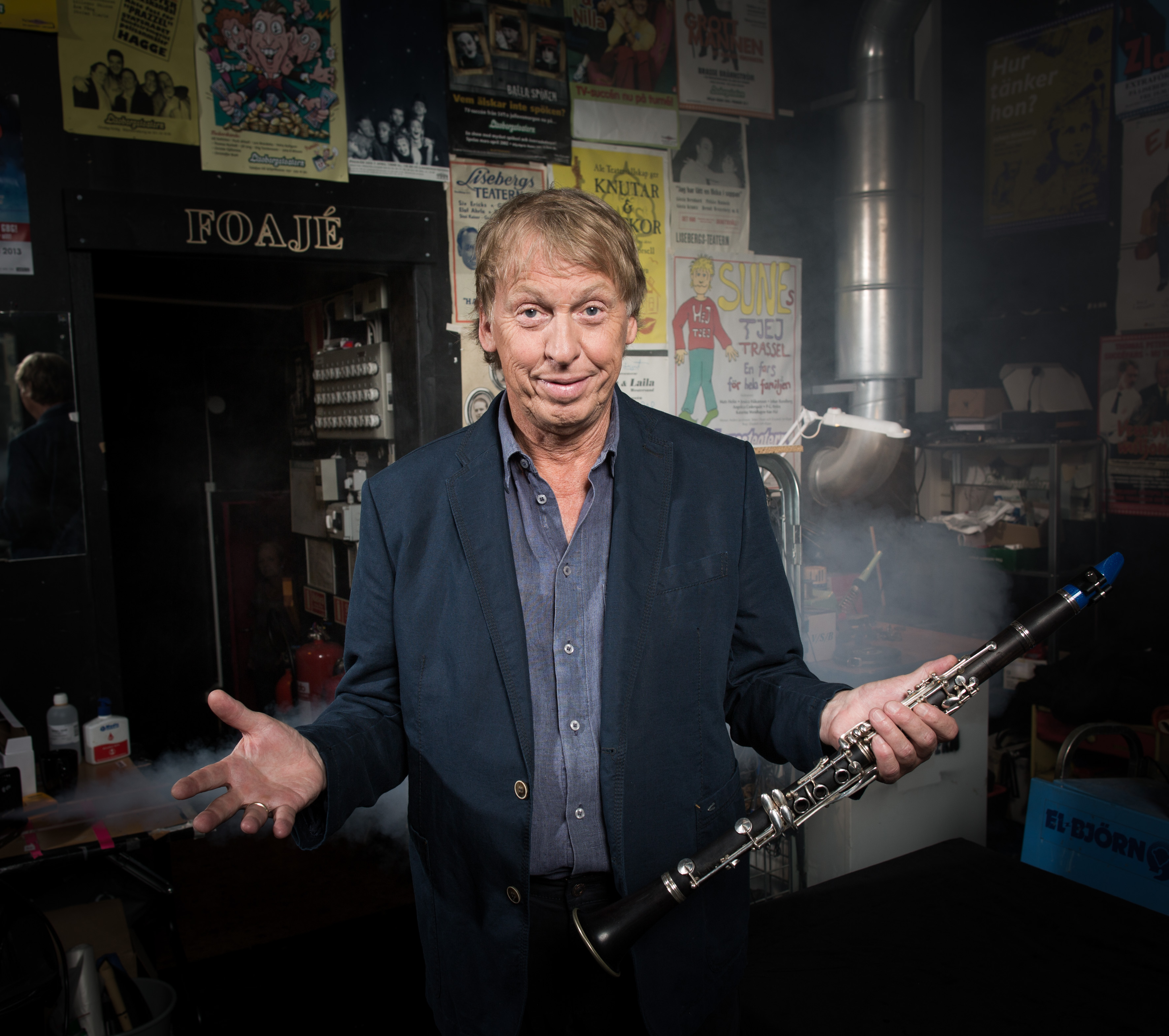
Tomas von Brömssen won the first award in 1995 for his performance in All Things Fair.

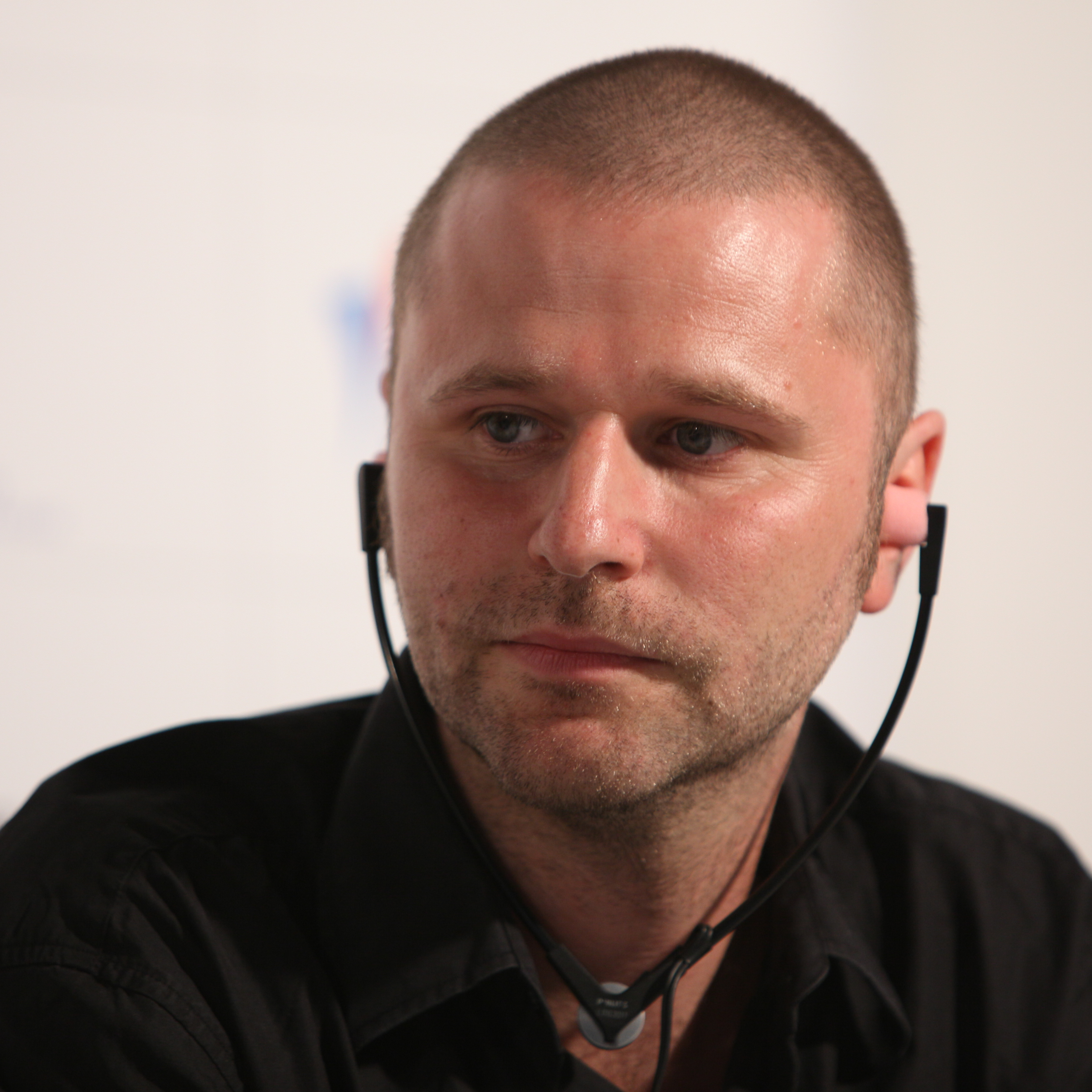
Shanti Roney won in 1999 for his performance in Vägen ut.

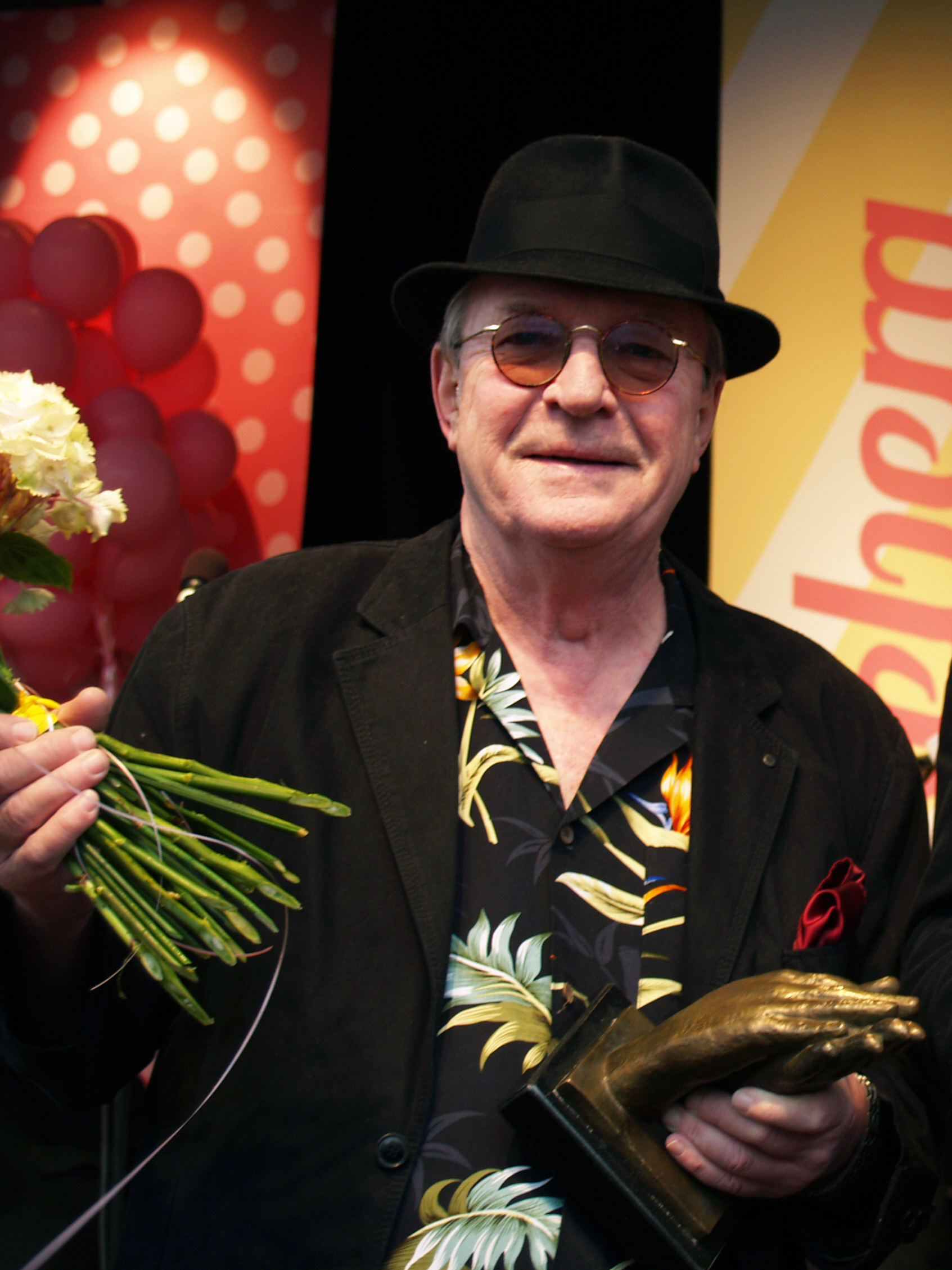
Brasse Brännström won in 2001 for his performance in Deadline.

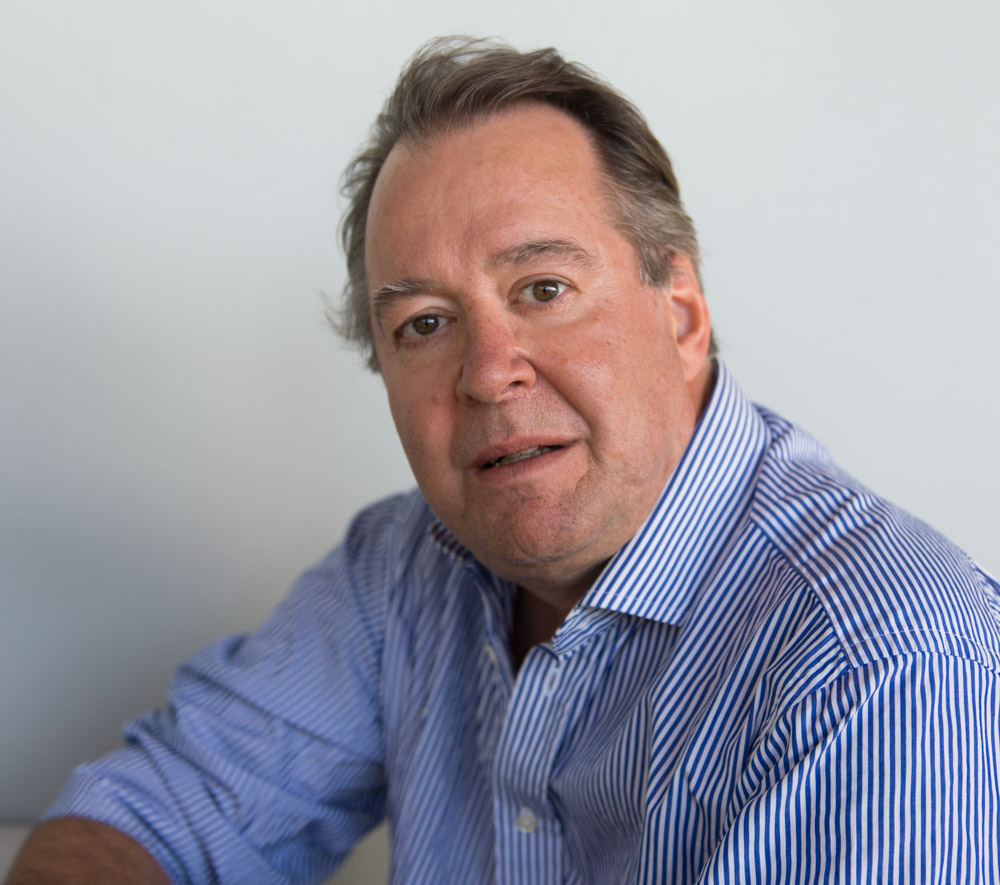
Göran Ragnerstam won in 2002 for his performance in Suxxess.

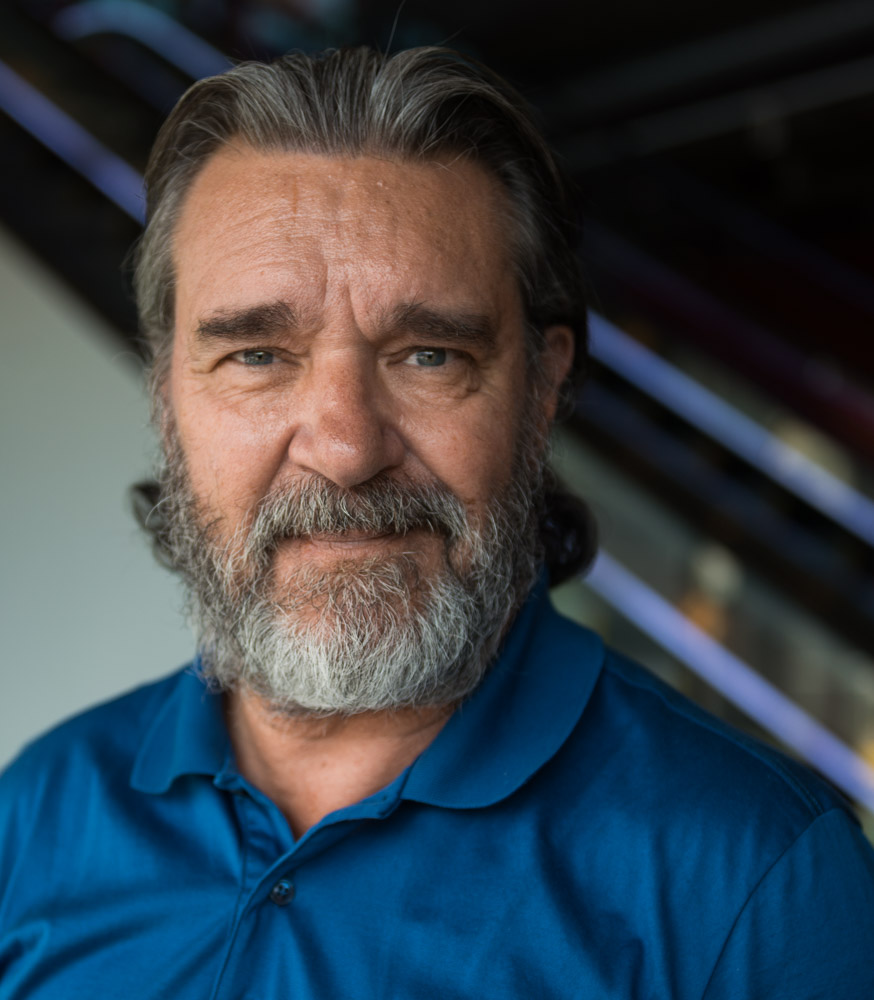
Kjell Bergqvist won in 2009 for his performance in Bröllopsfotografen.

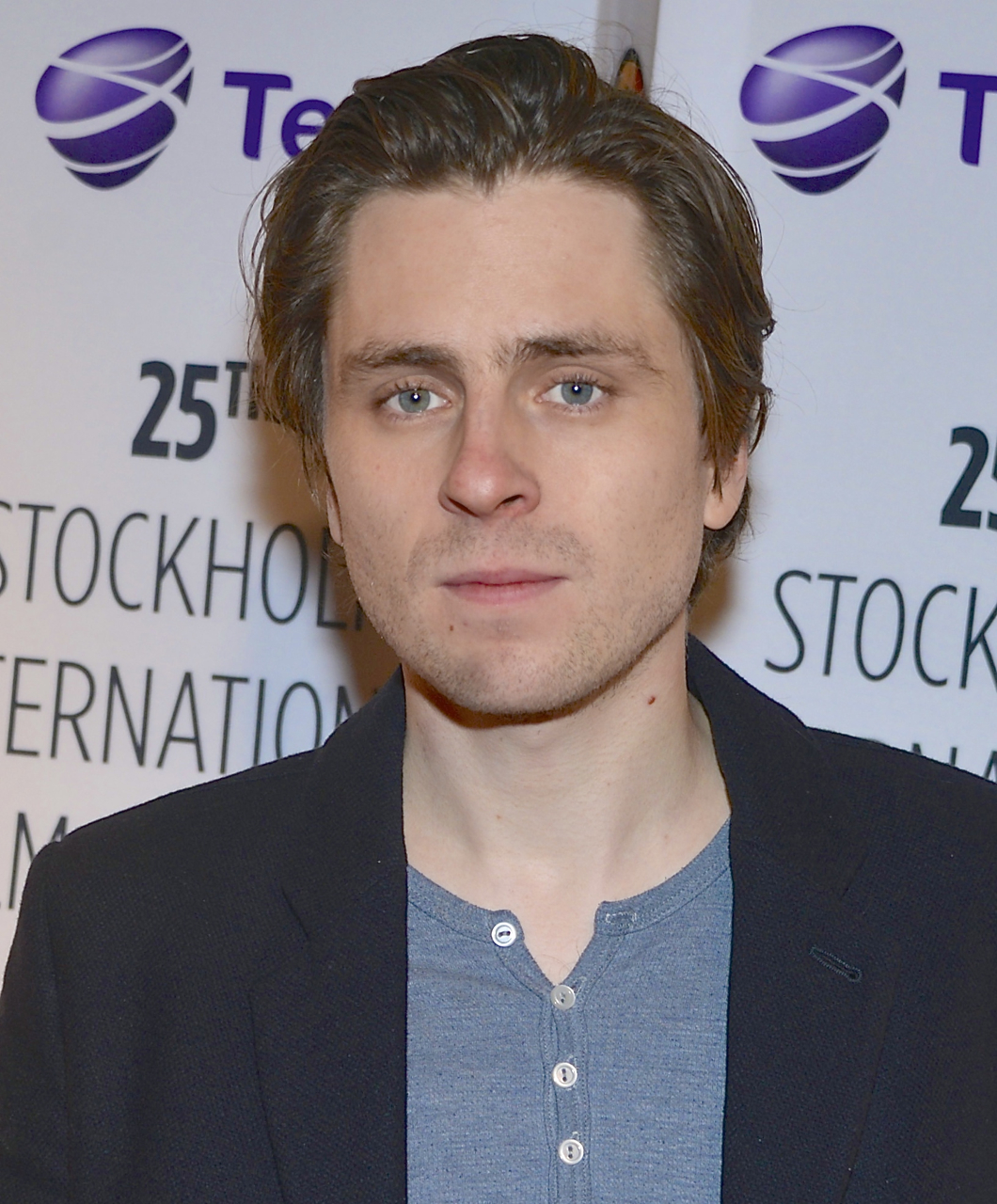
Sverrir Gudnason won in 2013 for his performance in Waltz for Monica.

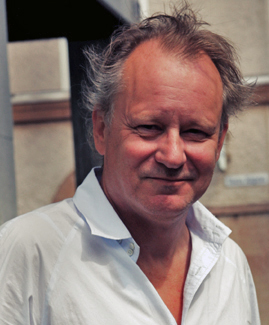
Stellan Skarsgård won in 2017 for his performance in Borg McEnroe.

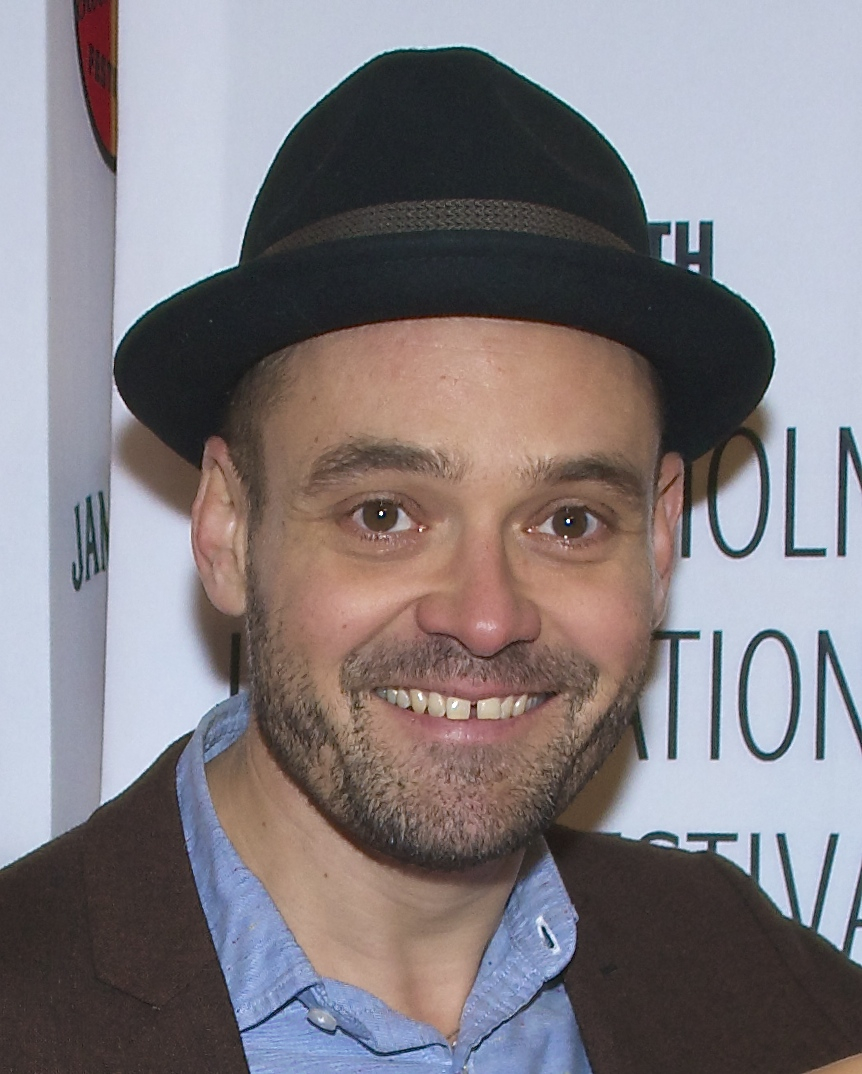
David Dencik won in 2019 for his performance in The Perfect Patient.

| Year | Actor | Film | Role(s) | Ref. |
|---|---|---|---|---|
| 1995 (31st) | Tomas von Brömssen‡ | All Things Fair | Kjell/"Frank" | |
| 1995 (31st) | Jonas Karlsson | 30:e november | Tobbe | |
| 1995 (31st) | Thommy Berggren | Stora och små män | Flodin | |
| 1996 (32nd) | Lennart Jähkel‡ | The Hunters | Leif Bäckström | |
| 1996 (32nd) | Reine Brynolfsson | Jerusalem | Tim | |
| 1996 (32nd) | Sven-Bertil Taube | Jerusalem | Helgum | |
| 1997 (33rd) | Emil Forselius‡ | Tic Tac | Lasse | |
| 1997 (33rd) | Jacob Ericksson | Adam & Eva | Åke Braun | |
| 1997 (33rd) | Krister Henriksson | Play Off | Jonny | |
| 1998 (34th) | Thommy Berggren‡ | Glasblåsarns barn | The Emperor | |
| 1998 (34th) | Johan Widerberg | Under the Sun | Erik | |
| 1998 (34th) | Ralph Carlsson | Show Me Love | Olof | |
| 1999 (35th) | Shanti Roney‡ | Vägen ut | Glenn | |
| 1999 (35th) | Peter Andersson | Zero Tolerance | Leo Gaut | |
| 1999 (35th) | Dan Ekborg | In Bed with Santa | Gunnar | |
| 2000 (36th) | Said Oveissi‡ | Wings of Glass | Abbas | |
| 2000 (36th) | Brasse Brännström | Gossip | Rolf Andersson | |
| 2000 (36th) | Michael Nyqvist | Together | Rolf | |
| 2001 (37th) | Brasse Brännström‡ | Deadline | Nils Langeby | |
| 2001 (37th) | Anders Ahlbom | Days Like This | Rune | |
| 2001 (37th) | Shanti Roney | Beck - Hämndens pris | Dag Sjöberg | |
| 2002 (38th) | Göran Ragnerstam‡ | Suxxess | Robert | |
| 2002 (38th) | Alexander Skarsgård | The Dog Trick | Robinson-Micke | |
| 2002 (38th) | Lennart Jähkel | Suxxess | James | |
| 2003 (39th) | Ingvar Hirdwall‡ | Daybreak | Knut | |
| 2003 (39th) | Gösta Ekman | Illusive Tracks | Theodor "Pompe" Bäckström | |
| 2003 (39th) | Gustaf Skarsgård | Evil | Otto Silverhielm | |
| 2004 (40th) | Ulf Brunnberg‡ | Four Shades of Brown | Olle | |
| 2004 (40th) | Joakim Lindblad | Dalecarlians | Jan-Olof | |
| 2004 (40th) | Lennart Jähkel | As It Is in Heaven | Arne | |
| 2005 (41st) | Magnus Krepper‡ | Mouth to Mouth | Morgan | |
| 2005 (41st) | Börje Ahlstedt | Percy, Buffalo Bill och jag | Farfar | |
| 2005 (41st) | Michael Nyqvist | Mother of Mine | Hjalmar Jönsson | |
| 2006 (42nd) | Anders Ahlbom‡ | The Secret | Roffe Liljegren | |
| 2006 (42nd) | Peter Engman | When Darkness Falls | Håkan | |
| 2006 (42nd) | David Johnson | Falkenberg Farewell | David | |
| 2007 (43rd) | Hassan Brijany‡ | Ett öga rött | Halims pappa | |
| 2007 (43rd) | Nicolaj Schröder | Hata Göteborg | Mitander | |
| 2007 (43rd) | Dan Ekborg | Mind the Gap | Ulf Enecke | |
| 2008 (44th) | Jesper Christensen‡ | Everlasting Moments | Sebastian Pedersen | |
| 2008 (44th) | Torkel Petersson | Patrik, Age 1.5 | Sven Skoogh | |
| 2008 (44th) | Per Ragnar | Let the Right One In | Håkan | |
| 2009 (45th) | Kjell Bergqvist‡ | Bröllopsfotografen | Jonny | |
| 2009 (45th) | Joel Kinnaman | Johan Falk – Gruppen för särskilda insatser | Frank Wagner | |
| 2009 (45th) | Sven-Bertil Taube | The Girl with the Dragon Tattoo | Henrik Vanger | |
| 2010 (46th) | Peter Dalle‡ | Behind Blue Skies | Gösta | |
| 2010 (46th) | Ville Virtanen | Beyond | Kimmo | |
| 2010 (46th) | David Dencik | Cornelis | Fred Åkerström | |
| 2011 (47th) | Jan Josef Liefers‡ | Simon and the Oaks | Ruben Lentov | |
| 2011 (47th) | Johan Widerberg | Happy End | Asger | |
| 2011 (47th) | Peter Andersson | Happy End | Mårten | |
| 2012 (48th) | Peter Carlberg‡ | Avalon | Klas | |
| 2012 (48th) | Milan Dragisic | Eat Sleep Die | Pappan | |
| 2012 (48th) | Fares Fares | Easy Money II: Hard to Kill | Mahmoud | |
| 2013 (49th) | Sverrir Gudnason‡ | Waltz for Monica | Sture Åkerberg | |
| 2013 (49th) | Kjell Bergqvist | Waltz for Monica | Bengt | |
| 2013 (49th) | David Dencik | Hotell | Rikard | |
| 2014 (50th) | Kristofer Hivju‡ | Force Majeure | Mats | |
| 2014 (50th) | Peter Andersson | Flugparken | Berndt | |
| 2014 (50th) | Sverrir Gudnason | Gentlemen | Leo Morgan | |
| 2015 (51st) | Mats Blomgren‡ | The Here After | Martin | |
| 2015 (51st) | Isaka Sawadogo | White People | Josef | |
| 2015 (51st) | Henrik Dorsin | Flocking | Tony | |
| 2016 (52nd) | Michael Nyqvist‡ | A Serious Game | Markel | |
| 2016 (52nd) | Henrik Dorsin | Flykten till framtiden | Bengan | |
| 2016 (52nd) | Iwar Wiklander | The 101-Year Old Man Who Skipped Out on the Bill and Disappeared | Julius | |
| 2016 (52nd) | Johan Kylén | The Giant | Roland | |
| 2017 (53rd) | Stellan Skarsgård‡ | Borg McEnroe | Lennart Bergelin | |
| 2017 (53rd) | Shia LaBeouf | Borg McEnroe | John McEnroe | |
| 2017 (53rd) | Yaser Maher | The Nile Hilton Incident | Kammal Mostafa | |
| 2017 (53rd) | Przemyslaw Sadowski | Strawberry Days | Jan | |
| 2018 (54th) | Eero Milonoff‡ | Border | Vore | |
| 2018 (54th) | Jens Albinus | X & Y | | |
| 2018 (54th) | Fredrik Hallgren | Sune vs Sune | Rudolf | |
| 2018 (54th) | Henrik Rafaelsen | Becoming Astrid | Blomberg | |
| 2019 (55th) | David Dencik‡ | The Perfect Patient | Thomas Quick / Sture Bergwall | |
| 2019 (55th) | Tomas von Brömssen | Sune – Best Man | Helmer | |
| 2019 (55th) | Ulf Stenberg | Fraemling | Mathias | |
| 2019 (55th) | Bachi Valishvili | And Then We Danced | Irakli | |
| 2020 (56th) | Ahmad Fadel‡ | Ghabe | Farid | |
| 2020 (56th) | Sverrir Gudnason | Charter | Mattias | |
| 2020 (56th) | Erik Johansson | Orca | John | |
| 2020 (56th) | Ville Virtanen | The Longest Day | | |

== Multiple nominations ==
Three nominations
- Peter Andersson
- David Dencik
- Sverrir Gudnason
- Lennart Jähkel
- Michael Nyqvist
Two nominations
- Anders Ahlbom
- Thommy Berggren
- Kjell Bergqvist
- Brasse Brännström
- Henrik Dorsin
- Dan Ekborg
- Shanti Roney
- Sven-Bertil Taube
- Johan Widerberg

== See also ==
- Academy Award for Best Supporting Actor
- BAFTA Award for Best Actor in a Supporting Role
- Golden Globe Award for Best Supporting Actor – Motion Picture
- Broadcast Film Critics Association Award for Best Supporting Actor
- Screen Actors Guild Award for Outstanding Performance by a Male Actor in a Supporting Role
