= Therese Johannessen =

Mysteriously disappeared person (Norway)

Disappearance of Therese Johannessen
- Born: September 19, 1978
- Disappeared: 3 July 1988; Fjell, Drammen, Norway
- Status: Missing for 38 years, 1 month and 12 days
- Other name: The Therese case
- Distinguishing features: Dark hair
- Investigating agency: Drammen Police
- Contact: Tips

Therese Johannessen was a Norwegian girl who disappeared at age nine on 3 July 1988 from outside her residence in Fjell in Drammen Municipality. She has not been found, despite many search operations and police investigations. In Norway, the disappearance of Therese Johannessen is sometimes called the Therese case (Therese-saken).

The Therese case received tremendous media attention in Norway. It remains one of the most famous unsolved criminal mysteries in the country. The case has also been linked to other similar disappearance cases, including the 1981 disappearance of Marianne Knutsen from Risør.

In 1998, Swedish man Thomas Quick was convicted in the case after confessing to kidnapping and killing the nine-year-old. Quick later retracted his confession, and the Swedish Prosecution Authority overturned the sentence in March 2011. The case has been re-investigated many times, most recently in 2013. In July 2013, 25 years after the disappearance, the case was no longer being considered because of the then 25-year time limit for serious criminal cases.

In 2020, NRK broadcast Therese — the girl who disappeared, a series about the Therese case. It was produced by Monster Media.

== Disappearance ==
On the evening of Sunday, 3 July 1988, nine-year-old Therese Johannesen was playing with three friends and her younger sister outside her home in Fjell, Drammen, Norway. Her playmates wanted to stop at a neighborhood kiosk where she visited earlier in the day. The other children asked Therese to join them at the kiosk, but she wanted to wait for them. They left, and when they returned, she was gone. This is the last confirmed sighting of Therese. Therese Johannesen was then wearing a white t-shirt, denim skirt, striped socks, and gray shoes.

When Therese did not come home, the family searched for her. Eventually, they summoned the police. Crews from the Red Cross and Civil Defense helped search using helicopters and other equipment. The police started to consider the disappearance a criminal case — that Therese was kidnapped and presumably killed.

The case attracted a lot of attention in Norway after the disappearance. Over 100 law enforcement officers from the Drammen Police and Kripos helped investigate. It was the most expensive and thorough investigation in Norway at the time. In the first year after the disappearance, the police questioned 1,721 people, and they got 4,646 tips from people. They also had lists of 10,640 people, 4,415 vehicles, and 13,685 movements of people and cars. The police have not found a single trace of the girl, or any suspect.

== Thomas Quick ==
After one year of investigation, the police scaled back the case, but never closed it fully. In 1996, the apparent Swedish serial killer Thomas Quick admitted to kidnapping and killing the girl in Drammen. The confession sparked law enforcement to resume the investigation. They started an extensive search for Therese in the pound Ringen near Mysen in Østfold. After emptying the pond, the police found what they thought was the girl's remains. The remains later turned out to be wood chips. Quick was linked to the murder through his confession and the "remains". He was convicted of 2 June 1998 of killing Therese Johannesen. Quick was convicted in six other trials of seven other murders.

In an SVT documentary in 2008, Quick retracted the confession and wanted to be tried again. He said he had read about the case in the newspaper VG and that he fabricated a story where he kidnapped and killed the girl. In March 2011, the judgement was overturned.

== Later investigation ==
The case was also re-investigated, but on 3 July 2013, 25 years after she was last seen, the case became obsolete. If the disappearance is found to be a case of murder, nobody would be prosecuted. That same autumn, the police received a tip that Therese was abducted and killed in 1988, and the police shortly reopened the case, without result.

In 2017, the police decided that the Therese case should be transferred to the "cold case group", even though the case is already obsolete.

In November 2020, Therese Johannessen's DNA was found on an eraser and pillowcase.
