= Jenny Küttim =

Swedish Journalist

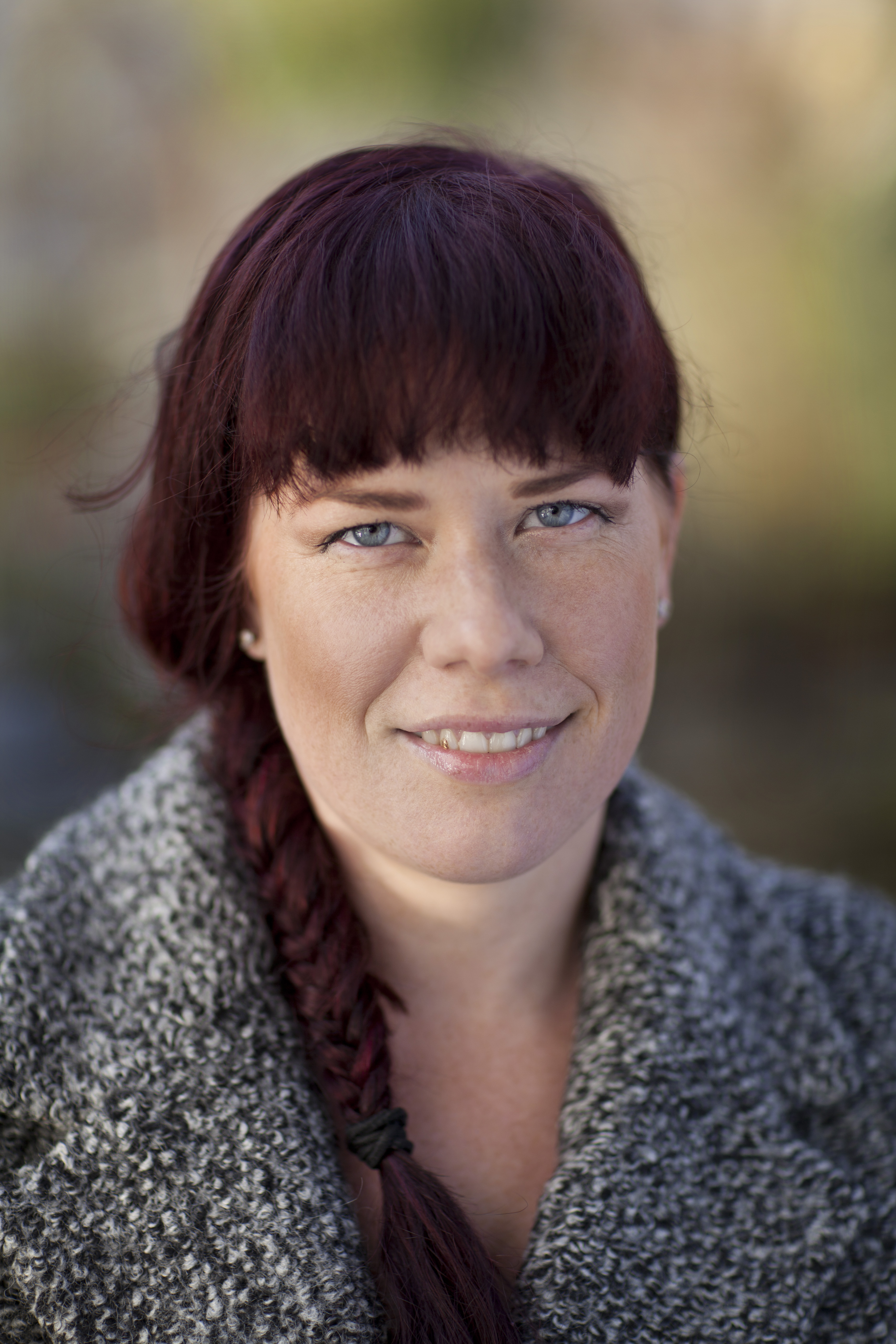
- Jenny Küttim in November 2014
- Born: 3 October 1982
- Occupation: Journalist

Jenny Küttim, born Andersson, is a Swedish investigative journalist.

She is best known for her extensive work with the alleged Swedish serial killer Thomas Quick. Quick, also known as Sture Bergwall(his birth name), confessed to more than thirty murders and he was convicted of eight of them, making him Sweden's most notorious serial killer. Küttim worked with mentor and friend, journalist Hannes Råstam and together they revealed Quick made false confessions, which resulted in the making of three award-winning documentaries. The documentaries reviewed the police investigation and revealed how Quick was fed with information and was guided through the crime scenes, high on drug-classed medication, which he had free access to. Meanwhile, he was treated in therapy for so-called repressed memories that led him to admit the eight murders he had not committed.

Küttim also helped compile the facts for her Råstam's book Thomas Quick: The Making of a Serial Killer which was published post mortem. The book was finished just the day before he died, at the age of 56, from cancer of the pancreas and liver in January 2012.

Küttim continued to work on Quick's story and together with college Dan Josefsson produced the documentary: The woman behind Thomas Quick which revealed the group of people that enabled the myth of Thomas Quick. The deeper investigation revealed the dynamic of group think which enabled the story of the serial killer who never was. In 2013 Quick was acquitted of all of the murders he had been convicted for after a five year long process to clear his name.

The Bergwall Commission confirmed that the extensive work of journalists like Küttim help spread light on systemic errors in the Swedish justice system. Sweden's interior minister, Anders Ygeman, said the report was a starting point to make the necessary changes “to ensure that this never happens again”.

== Biography ==
Küttim was raised as Jehovah's Witness, but left the movement during her teens. She completed journalism education through the International Business School in Washington DC. She did her internship at Fox News during the start of the Iraq War in 2003, and her supervisor was an "Air Force One reporter", accompanying the US president on his travels. When she returned to Sweden, she studied contemporary history plus the practical journalism program at Södertörn University and after graduating in 2007 started working on Swedish Public Television SVT's high-profile investigative magazine Dokument inifrån.

On May 16, 2010, the documentary McFusk & C was aired, which revealed among other things, McDonald's cheating with employees' salaries, made by Küttim and producer Bo Lindquist, also known for the Macchiarini scandal.

In the 2010 Swedish election, Küttim was one of the Swedish Radio Election Observers, who examined the politicians' claims true or false.

In 2012, Detector was launched in Sweden's Radio P1, a fact-checking program which Küttim co-hosted with Henrik Torehammar. The program was broadcast five times during March and April 2012. The concept and the name Detector originate from Denmark and Danmarks radio, where Küttim was involved in developing the original Detektor show together with program host Thomas Buch Andersen.

In August 2015 Brian Hill's documentary about Sweden's most notorious serial killer, The confessions of Thomas Quick was released in UK cinemas, featuring Küttim explaining how this remarkable story had occurred.

During the 2018 election, SVT announced that Küttim, together with journalist Fredrik Laurin, would work for the Facts poll which was included in faktiskt.se, which was run by SVT, Sveriges Radio, Dagens Nyheter and Svenska Dagbladet, and which reviewed facts during the parliamentary elections and which ended in December 2018.

In the spring of 2019, she was one of the reporters for Veckans brott, a popular TV-show for true crimes on Swedish national TV.

In the third quarter 2019, the feature film Quick produced by Mikael Håfström is scheduled to premiere. The film depicts Råstam and Küttim's work revealing the truth about Thomas Quick. Alba August plays the role of Küttim and Jonas Karlsson plays Råstam, while David Dencik plays Quick.

== Prizes and awards ==
- 2019 - Nominated for Kristallen for the documentary The man who played with fire about the famous Swedish author Stieg Larsson
