= A Piece of My Heart (film) =

- Swedish Release Poster
- Swedish: En del av mitt hjärta
- Directed by: Edward af Sillén
- Written by: Lars "Vasa" Johansson
- Produced by: Suzanne Glansborg; Lone Korslund; Peter Possne; Patrick Ryborn; Poa Strömberg; Malin Söderlund
- Starring: Malin Åkerman; Christian Hillborg; Jonas Karlsson; Per Andersson; Shima Niavarani; Johan Ulveson; Johan Rheborg; Marie Richardson
- Cinematography: Tuomo Hutri
- Music by: Tomas Ledin, Björn Ulvaeus and Andreas Carlsson
- Production company: Unlimited Stories
- Distributed by: Svensk Filmindustri (Sweden); Picture Tree International (International)
- Release date: 25 December 2019 (Sweden)
- Country: Sweden
- Language: Swedish

A Piece of My Heart (Swedish: En del av mitt hjärta) is a Swedish jukebox musical film directed by Edward af Sillén and written by Lars "Vasa" Johansson based on music by Tomas Ledin. The title is taken from Ledin's Grammis award-winning song "En del av mitt hjärta". The lead role is played by Malin Åkerman, starring in her first Swedish film, with an ensemble cast featuring Christian Hillborg, Jonas Karlsson, Per Andersson, Shima Niavarani, Johan Ulveson, Johan Rheborg, and Marie Richardson. The film was produced and filmed in Sweden by Unlimited Stories. It was released on 25 December 2019. When interviewed about the film, Ledin expressed his amazement at the quality of the script and said how happy he was to be part of something like this. He also suggested that three or four of the songs are much better than his original. Af Sillén described the film as an "all in-musical comedy" with a great ensemble and big, lavish shownumbers.

== Plot ==
The plot follows Isabella, a successful business woman in the financial district of Stockholm, who returns to her small-town home to celebrate her father's birthday, only to find her teenage crush is marrying her childhood best friend. She also realises that her successful dealings in Stockholm will cause the closing of an important local industry.

== Cast ==
- Malin Åkerman as Isabella
  - Lovisa Bengtsson as young Isabella
- Christian Hillborg as Simon
  - Egon Ebbersten as young Simon
- Shima Niavarani as Molly
  - Náthalie Andersson as young Molly
- Per Andersson as Kristoffer
- Jonas Karlsson as Edvin
- Marie Richardson as Greta
- Johan Rheborg as The Boss
- Johan Ulveson as Rune

== Release ==
A Piece of My Heart was released on 25 December 2019 in Sweden. Nordisk Film will look after the Scandinavia roll-out, with the release in Finland set for 3 January 2020.

On 25 October 2019, it was announced that Björn Ulvaeus has arranged an English dub of the film. He worked with Swedish songwriter Andreas Carlsson to produce English versions of Ledin's songs, recorded by the original Swedish cast. In November 2019, private previews of the English version were screened for invited guests in the hope of establishing a further international release. Ledin asked Ulvaeus if he would be interested in writing English lyrics for his songs as they are long time friends. The film's release in Israel, Taiwan and Poland is already confirmed.

== Reception ==
=== Accolades ===
Award	Category	Recipient(s)	Result
Guldbaggens Award	Best Costume Design	Anna Hagert and Anna Karlsson	Nominated
Guldbaggens Award	Best Makeup and Hair	Jenny Fred	Nominated
Guldbaggens Award	Guldbaggens publikpris (Audience Award)	Edward af Sillén	Nominated
