= Bruno Lüdke =

Alleged German serial killer (1908–1944)

- Born: 3 April 1908; Köpenick, German Empire
- Died: 8 April 1944 (aged 36); Vienna, Nazi Germany
- Cause of death: Execution

Details
- Victims: 0–86
- Span of crimes: 1928–1943
- Country: Germany
- Date apprehended: 18 March 1943

Bruno Lüdke (3 April 1908 – 8 April 1944) was a German alleged serial killer. Police officials connected him to at least 51 murder victims, mainly women, killed in a 15-year period, which began in 1928 and ended with his arrest in 1943. He was killed during the Nazi regime without a trial. It is now considered very likely that he did not commit any of the crimes he is accused of.

== Arrest ==
Born in Köpenick, Lüdke had a mild intellectual disability (he could not, for example, tell interrogators how many minutes there were in an hour) and worked as a coachman. He was well known by the local police as a petty thief and peeping tom. On 31 January 1943, a woman was found murdered in the woods near Köpenick, strangled with her own shawl. The victim showed signs of post-mortem sexual abuse, and her purse was missing. Police brought in Lüdke for questioning on 18 March 1943, where he quickly confessed to murdering not only the woman but also several other victims, and was taken into custody. Witnesses report Lüdke showed signs of physical abuse, and he stated that "if I don't say that I murdered [someone], they'll shoot me dead!".

Lüdke was never put on trial for any of the killings. Declared insane, he was sent to the SS-run Institute of Criminological Medicine in Vienna, where medical experiments were carried out on him until his death, when an experiment went wrong in 1944.

== Controversy and question of innocence ==
The 50-odd crime scenes showed no similarities in modus operandi, signature, or motive. No fingerprints were ever found, and no evidence against Lüdke has ever been presented. Attempts at reopening the case by members of the Kriminalrat (Detective Major) Faulhaber yielded no results. The true nature of the 51 murders remains unsolved.

Former Dutch police chief Jan Blaauw investigated original police reports and found them to be inconclusive, incoherent, and vague. He also expressed his disbelief that a semi-illiterate, who once got caught stealing a chicken, could evade authorities for nearly 20 years, let alone get away with murder. Blaauw also proved that Lüdke could not have committed many of the crimes across Germany logistically.

The opinion of Lüdke as a murderer persisted until the 1990s. Today, most historians believe Lüdke to be the victim of a frame-up, carried out by an ambitious Kriminalkommissar (Detective Captain) Franz, the heavily censored Reichskriminalpolizeiamt, and the Nazi government, which saw people with intellectual disabilities as inferior and welcomed scapegoats.

== Film adaption ==
A 1957 film directed by Robert Siodmak, The Devil Strikes at Night, dubbed Lüdke as one of Germany's worst serial killers. The successful film won the German Film Award for Best Fiction Film and received a nomination for the Academy Award for Best Foreign Language Film.

== Memorial ==
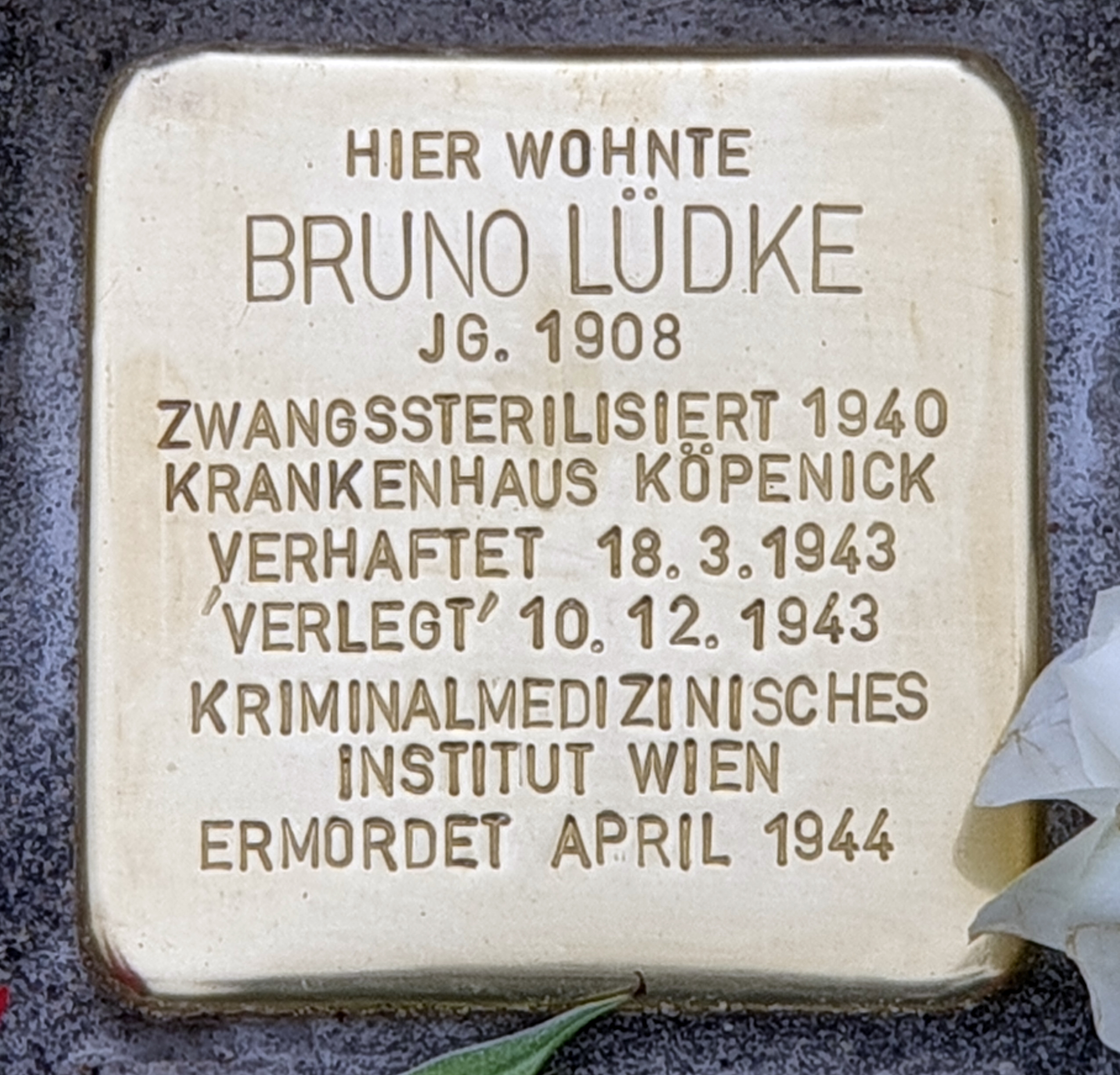
Stolperstein at the House Grüne Trift 32A in Berlin-Köpenick. The inscription begins "Bruno Lüdke lived here"

In 2021, a Stolperstein was erected at Lüdke's former home in memory of him as a victim of the Nazi regime. The campaign was initiated by the actor Mario Adorf, who played Lüdke in Nachts, wenn der Teufel kam and later regretted the role after Lüdke's near-certain innocence was established. The inscription (pictured, "Hier Wohnte Bruno Lüdke JG. 1908 Zwangssterlisiert 1940. Verhaftet 18.3.1943 Verlegt 10.12.1943 Kriminalmedizinisches Institute Wien. Erwordet April 1944") says "Bruno Lüdke lived here. Born 1908. Forcibly sterilized 1940. Arrested March 18, 1943. Transferred December 10, 1943, to the Institute for Criminal Medicine, Vienna. Murdered April 1944."

== See also ==
- Henry Lee Lucas
- Sture Bergwall
