= Hassan Brijany =

Swedish actor (1961–2020)

- Born: 12 April 1961
- Died: 23 July 2020 (aged 59)
- Occupation: Actor

Hassan Brijany (12 April 1961 – 23 July 2020) was an Iranian–Swedish actor.

== Biography ==
Brijany grew up in north Iran. His father wanted him to become a brain surgeon, but he was more interested in theater. He got his education in acting in Tehran, but was forced to leave the country in the mid 1980s because of the effects of the Iranian revolution and war with Iraq and travelled to Sweden.

Brijany learned to speak Swedish quickly and after a few months in the country he got a job as an interpreter for migration work. At the end of the 1980s, Brijany started acting again and debuted in the Play Främmande at Angeredteatern in Gothenburg. He would also appear in TV-series like Tre Kronor on TV4, Tusenbröder and Orka! Orka! Brijany became known to a larger audience with his role as Serbandi in the film Hus i helve in 2002. He has also had roles in Beck – Det tysta skriket in 2007 and Babas bilar in 2006. He won a Guldbagge Award for Best Actor in a Supporting Role for the 2007 film adaptation of Jonas Hassen Khemiri's novel One Eye Red. In 2017, he appeared in a Gothenburg City Theatre production of Gösta Berling's Saga.

Hassan Brijany died in July 2020, after suffering from COVID-19 during the COVID-19 pandemic in Sweden.

== Filmography ==
- 2002 – Vera med flera
- 2002– Hus i helvete
- 2003 – Paragraf 9 (TV-series)
- 2004 – Tusenbröder II
- 2005 – Orka! Orka!
- 2006 – Exit
- 2006 – Babas Bilar
- 2006 – Mäklarna
- 2006 – Möbelhandlarens dotter
- 2006 – LasseMajas detektivbyrå
- 2007 – Labyrint
- 2007 – Beck – Det tysta skriket
- 2007 – Råttatouille (voice as Mustafa)
- 2007 – Ett öga rött
- 2007– 2009 – Hjälp!
- 2008 – LasseMajas detektivbyrå – Kameleontens hämnd
- 2008 – George
- 2010 – Saltön
- 2012 – Kontoret
- 2014 – LasseMajas detektivbyrå – Stella Nostra
- 2017 – Sveriges bästa svensk
- 2020 – Sveriges bästa svensk, part 2
