= Alvar Larsson =

Swedish boy who went missing

- Born: Alvar Larsson; 24 December 1953; Sweden
- Disappeared: 16 April 1967 (age 13)
- Died: c. 1967

Alvar Larsson was a Swedish boy who disappeared on 16 April 1967. Alvar and his family lived at a farm called Sundslätt at the southeast part of the island Sirkö in Åsnen, one of the largest lakes in Småland. He left his house on a Sunday morning to take a walk and bring in some wood, leaving no traces behind. In 1982, more than fifteen years after the disappearance, his cranium was found on a small island 6 km away. The disappearance attracted a lot of media coverage at the time and many theories as to what happened have been put forward. Thomas Quick has confessed to the crime, but has recanted all his confessions.

== Disappearance and search ==
On the morning of April 16, 1967, Alvar was woken up at half past seven by his mother. He ate a bun, drank a glass of fruit juice and dressed in his everyday clothes. Before breakfast and a visit to the church later that morning, Alvar wanted to go for a walk. His mother let him go and told him to bring in wood as he returned. No-one has reported seeing him since.

By the time it was too late for Alvar to eat breakfast, get dressed and leave for church, his mother phoned the nearest neighbours asking about Alvar, but no-one had seen him. Alvar's father phoned the nearest neighbour and the two men searched the farm for the boy. Later, all the neighbours were asked to join the search. A constable named Emanuelsson was asked to start a search for Alvar as he was only five kilometers away at the time. The initial search party consisted of the family, neighbours, two police officers, a privately owned German Shepherd and the Home Guard. The search went on into the night without result.

In the early morning, Harald contacted the police and informed them Alvar still had not returned, and yet another search soon started. In the afternoon, fifty servicemen from the army infantry regiment I 11 in Växjö joined. During the following week, more people arrived to aid the search, and the lake was searched using boats. A police helicopter was also flown in from Stockholm on Tuesday. At most, 150 persons were in the search party at the same time.

== Theories ==
=== Runaway ===
Initially the main theory was that thirteen-year-old Alvar had run from home. However, it is hard to explain why Alvar would not have dressed up more with heavier shoes, eaten breakfast, brought his money and/or used his bicycle if he had planned to leave.

A boy of Alvar's age had been seen north of Kalmar, in Påskallavik, but he was later identified. This was also the case for a boy who had gotten a ride by a truck driver, a boy that had been seen spending the Sunday night at the postal station in Rottne, and other boys that had been spotted hitch-hiking in the area.

=== Accident ===
That Alvar would have been alive during the week-long search and later died has been dismissed by most sources. If he had died in an accident, it would most likely have happened early Sunday, and the location of his death would have been the lake. It is just short of a kilometre from Sundslätt to the lake, and there is speculation that Alvar suddenly decided to row out in a boat. During the investigation, all the boats in the lake were checked, but one is said to have been overlooked by its owner due to its bad condition. That Alvar could not swim suggests he would not have entered a boat, but if he had, his lack of ability to swim could have become fatal.

It is said that the fact that Alvar's clogs have not surfaced at the waterside, as opposed to many other clogs, suggests that he did not drown in the lake.

=== Crime ===
The first theories involving a crime were suggested on Monday, and these ideas seemed more plausible as time passed. The police received several tips about persons who had acted suspiciously, all of which were rejected. One theory was Alvar might have gone to the cellar to smoke and someone passing convinced him to follow them.

== Grave-opening ==
In 1978, more than ten years after the disappearance, a grave was opened. A woman had told the police of how a relative of hers had told her of how he'd killed a boy in Småland in 1967 and how he'd hidden the body near the deserted summer house for two years. The man would then have moved the body to the bottom of a grave, which had been prepared for a relative of his and which he'd covered with spruce twigs. Although he had been celebrating the 50th anniversary of his wedding on the day Alvar disappeared and had been working the night before, the grave was opened. In front of a large press gathering, the coffin was lifted out and nothing was found under it.

== Discovery of the skull ==
In November 1982, three hunters had rowed to Harö, a small island, to train their dogs. In a bay they found a human skull. Realizing the teeth had modern fillings and thus could not be an archeological finding, the men contacted the police. The police immediately assumed the skull belonged to Alvar and using his dental record, this theory was confirmed. The island was searched thoroughly but the only other finding was two row boats whose owners soon contacted the police and it was concluded Alvar could not have used either of the boats to get to the island.

Although there was a big hole in the back of the skull, experts could not determine whether the damage was from a fatal blow or had been caused by weathering during the years since the boy's death. The skull of Alvar has since been buried alongside of the boy's father and any crime involved with the disappearance has been barred under the statute of limitations.

== Books ==
- Kohlström, Klas (1999). Nordisk kriminalkrönika 1999. Nordiska polisidrottsförbundet.

== See also ==
- List of solved missing person cases
- List of unsolved deaths
