= Don't Let the Sun =

2025 Swiss–Italian Sci–fi film

- Promotional poster
- Directed by: Jacqueline Zünd
- Screenplay by: Jacqueline Zünd; Arne Kohlweyer
- Produced by: Louis Mataré; David Fonjallaz; Davide Pagano
- Starring: Levan Gelbakhiani; Maria Pia Pepe; Agnese Claisse; Karidja Touré
- Cinematography: Nikolai von Graevenitz
- Edited by: Gion-Reto Killias
- Music by: Marcel Vaid
- Production companies: Lomotion; CDV – Casa delle Visioni
- Distributed by: Filmcoopi Zürich
- Release dates: 9 August 2025 (Locarno); 19 March 2026 (Switzerland)
- Running time: 100 minutes
- Countries: Switzerland; Italy
- Language: English

Don't Let the Sun is 2025 Swiss-Italian science fiction drama film co–written and directed by Jacqueline Zünd. The film starring Levan Gelbakhiani, is a tender drama about the fragility of human relationships.

The film had its world premiere at the 78th Locarno Film Festival on 9 August 2025, in the Filmmakers of the Present Competition section, where it competed for Golden Leopard – Filmmakers of the Present

== Synopsis ==
The story is set in a dystopian world similar to our own, with a hot climate and little emotional connection between people. Jonah works for a company that sells simulated relationships. When he is assigned to play the role of father to a young woman named Nika, his orderly life begins to fall apart.

== Cast ==
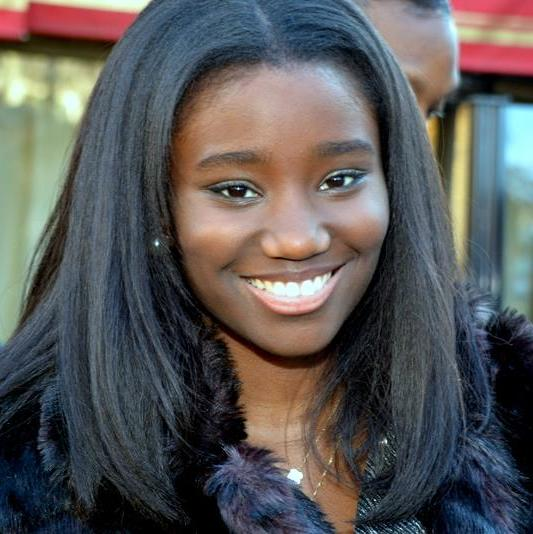
Karidja Touré cast of the film

- Levan Gelbakhiani as Jonah
- Maria Pia Pepe as Nika
- Agnese Claisse as Cleo
- Karidja Touré as Ana
- Cecilia Bertozzi

== Production ==
The film won 'Goes to Cannes' Award in May 2024, the prize organized by Marché du Film spotlights work-in-progress projects, and guarantees a €10,000 minimum for international sales. It is sponsored by Sideral, a Spain-based studio. The film was also part of five-title selection curated by the Solothurn Film Festival, included among 35 in-progress projects spotlighted at 2024 Cannes Film Festival through Seven Goes To Showcases. These showcases were coordinated by the Marché du Film in collaboration with the Adelaide, Queer Screen – Mardi Gras Film Festival, Solothurn Goes to Cannes, Golden Horse Film Festival and Awards, and Tallinn Black Nights Film Festival. Additional presentations were made by the Hong Kong – Asia Film Financing Forum and Ventana Sur.

== Release ==
Don't Let the Sun had its world premiere in the 'Filmmakers of the Present Competition' section of the 78th Locarno Film Festival on 9 August 2025, vying for the Golden Leopard – Filmmakers of the Present. It was also presented in the World Cinema section at the 30th Busan International Film Festival on 20 September 2025. It was also screened in International Perspective at the São Paulo International Film Festival on 20 October 2025.

It competed in Film Forward Competition section at the Thessaloniki International Film Festival in November 2025.

It will also run for Audience Award in Panorama Feature Film at the Solothurn Film Festival on 24 January 2026.

The film is slated to release in Swiss cinemas on 19 March 2026 by Filmcoopi.

== Accolades ==
Award	Date of ceremony	Category	Recipient	Result	Ref.
Locarno Film Festival	16 August 2025	Golden Leopard – Filmmakers of the Present	Don't Let the Sun	Nominated	
Locarno Film Festival	16 August 2025	Pardo for Best Performance	Levan Gelbakhiani	Won	
