= Southern Buskerud Police District =

Agency overview
- Formed: 1 January 2003
- Employees: 455

Jurisdictional structure
- Operations jurisdiction: Southern Buskerud, Buskerud, Norway
- General nature: Local civilian police

Operational structure
- Overseen by: National Police Directorate
- Headquarters: Drammen Police Station
- Agency executive: Johan Brekke, Chief of Police

Facilities
- Stations: 10

Website
- https://www.politi.no/romerike

Southern Buskerud Police District (Norwegian: Romerike politidistrikt) is one of 27 police districts in Norway, covering the southern part of Buskerud and northern Vestfold. The district is headquartered in Drammen and consists of two police stations, at Drammen and Kongsberg, and eight sheriff's offices. The district is led by Chief of Police Johan Brekke. Specifically the police district covers the municipalities of Drammen, Kongsberg, Øvre Eiker, Nedre Eiker, Lier, Røyken, Hurum, Flesberg, Rollag in Buskerud and Svelvik and Sande in Vestfold. As of 2011 the district had 455 employees. The police district was created in 2003 as a merger between the former Drammen Police District and Kongsberg Police District.
