= The Perfect Patient =

Swedish drama film

- English-language promotional poster
- Directed by: Mikael Håfström
- Starring: Jonas Karlsson; David Dencik
- Release date: 20 September 2019
- Running time: 132 minutes
- Country: Sweden
- Language: Swedish

The Perfect Patient, also known as Quick, is a 2019 Swedish drama film directed by Mikael Håfström. It follows a Swedish judicial scandal after the truth about the convict Sture Bergwall, also known as "Thomas Quick", is revealed by journalist Hannes Råstam.

== Cast ==
- Jonas Karlsson - Hannes Råstam
- David Dencik - Sture Bergwall, also known as "Thomas Quick"
- Alba August - Jenny Küttim
- Magnus Roosmann - Christer van der Kwast

== Reception ==
The Perfect Patient received mixed reviews, including a 3.5 star review from CineMagazine.
