= And Then We Danced =

2019 film by Levan Akin

- Swedish theatrical release poster
- Directed by: Levan Akin
- Written by: Levan Akin
- Produced by: Mathilde Dedye; Ketie Danelia
- Starring: Levan Gelbakhiani; Bachi Valishvili
- Cinematography: Lisabi Fridell
- Edited by: Levan Akin; Simon Carlgren
- Music by: Ben Wheeler and Zviad Mgebry
- Production companies: French Quarter Film; Takes Film; AMA Productions; RMV Film; Inland Film
- Distributed by: TriArt Film (Sweden); ARP Sélection (France)
- Release dates: 16 May 2019 (Cannes); 13 September 2019 (Sweden); 6 November 2019 (France)
- Running time: 105 minutes
- Countries: Sweden; Georgia; France
- Language: Georgian
- Box office: $580,075

And Then We Danced (Georgian: და ჩვენ ვიცეკვეთ, Da chven vitsek'vet) is a 2019 Georgian language drama film directed by Levan Akin. It was premiered in the Directors' Fortnight section at the 2019 Cannes Film Festival where it received a fifteen-minute standing ovation. It was one of the most favourably reviewed films out of Cannes that year. It was selected as the Swedish entry for the Best International Feature Film at the 92nd Academy Awards, but it was not nominated. Screening of the film in Georgia sparked protests, due to its portrayal of a gay love affair.

== Plot ==
Merab is a young and dedicated Georgian dancer training at the National Georgian Ensemble with his partner and pseudo-girlfriend, Mary, and his delinquent brother, David. His position is threatened when Irakli, a new dancer, joins the group. Though initially jealous, Merab forms a bond with Irakli as they compete for a spot in the ensemble.

Merab's father urges him to quit dancing and pursue an education, while his relationship with Irakli deepens. The two share a secret romance, though Mary becomes suspicious. After several missed rehearsals, David shows up, only to be kicked out by Aleko due to his criminal behavior. Merab tries to help by getting him a job at the restaurant where he works, but David's actions lead to both of them being fired, straining their relationship further.

Merab, still missing Irakli, meets a young male prostitute and has a night out at a gay bar, but is seen by fellow dancer Luka. Hungover, Merab injures his ankle during rehearsal the next day and is discouraged from auditioning. However, Merab insists on continuing the practice despite his injury. Luka continues to heckle him, while Mary warns him to be careful, fearing he might end up like the ensemble's former dancer.

At David's wedding, Merab spots Irakli, who reveals he is leaving to marry a woman. At home, a heartbroken Merab is comforted by an injured David, who reveals he was hurt defending Merab's honor from Luka and the other dancers. Merab comes out to him, and David encourages him to leave Georgia to pursue his dreams.

At the audition, Merab dances in his unorthodox style, impressing choreographer Aleko but offending the director, who storms out. Undeterred, Merab finishes his routine and bows before leaving.

== Cast ==
- Levan Gelbakhiani as Merab
- Bachi Valishvili as Irakli
- Ana Javakishvili as Mary
- Giorgi Tsereteli as David
- Marika Gogichaishvili as grandmother Nona
- Kakha Gogidze as Aleko
- Tamar Bukhnikashvili as Teona
- Levan Gabrava as Luka
- Nino Gabisonia as Ninutsa
- Ana Makharadze as Sopo
- Aleko Begalishvili as Loseb
- Mate Khidasheli as Mate

== Development ==
In an interview with the Zurich Film Festival, director Levin Akin said that he was inspired by images of the 2013 Tbilisi anti-homophobia rally protests where dozens of young people protesting homophobia were violently attacked by thousands of counter-protesters from the Georgian Orthodox Church. He visited Tbilisi in 2016 to do research on the situation and was inspired to make the film as a discussion on the development of tradition and identity as opposed to a more conventional coming out narrative.

The film was logistically difficult to shoot. Due to the nature of the film and prevalent homophobia in Georgia, an alternative story was told to onlookers that the film was about a French tourist who falls in love with Georgian culture. Actors and locations that agreed to be in the film would later refuse to participate due to the nature of the film or fear of backlash. The production crew received death threats and had to hire security while on set. Both lead actors Levan Gelbakhiani and Bachi Valishvili, who were contacted by Akin via social media, initially refused the offered roles due to concerns about backlash in Georgia and how it would affect their future careers.

== Release ==
First released in the US February 7, 2020. The film sold to more than 40 countries.

== Reception ==
=== Critical response ===
On review aggregator website Rotten Tomatoes, the film has an approval rating of 93%, based on 91 reviews, and an average rating of 7.8/10. The website's critical consensus reads, "Led by an outstanding performance from Levan Gelbakhiani, And Then We Danced defeats prejudice with overwhelming compassion." On Metacritic, the film has a score of 68% based on reviews from 20 critics, indicating "generally favorable reviews".

=== Awards and nominations ===
In July 2019, at the 10th Odesa International Film Festival, the film won the Grand Prix, decided by the audience, as well as the Best Film and Best Actor awards, decided by the international jury. In August 2019, Levan Gelbakhiani won the Heart of Sarajevo Award for Best Actor at the 25th Sarajevo Film Festival. In October 2019, the film won the Best Feature Film Award at the 2019 Iris Prize Festival. In January 2020, the film played in the prestigious Spotlight section at the Sundance Film Festival. It tied with Aniara for most awards at the 55th Guldbagge Awards, winning four awards including Best Film.

And Then We Danced was nominated for the 2021 GLAAD Media Award for Outstanding Film (Limited Release).

== Screenings and protests ==
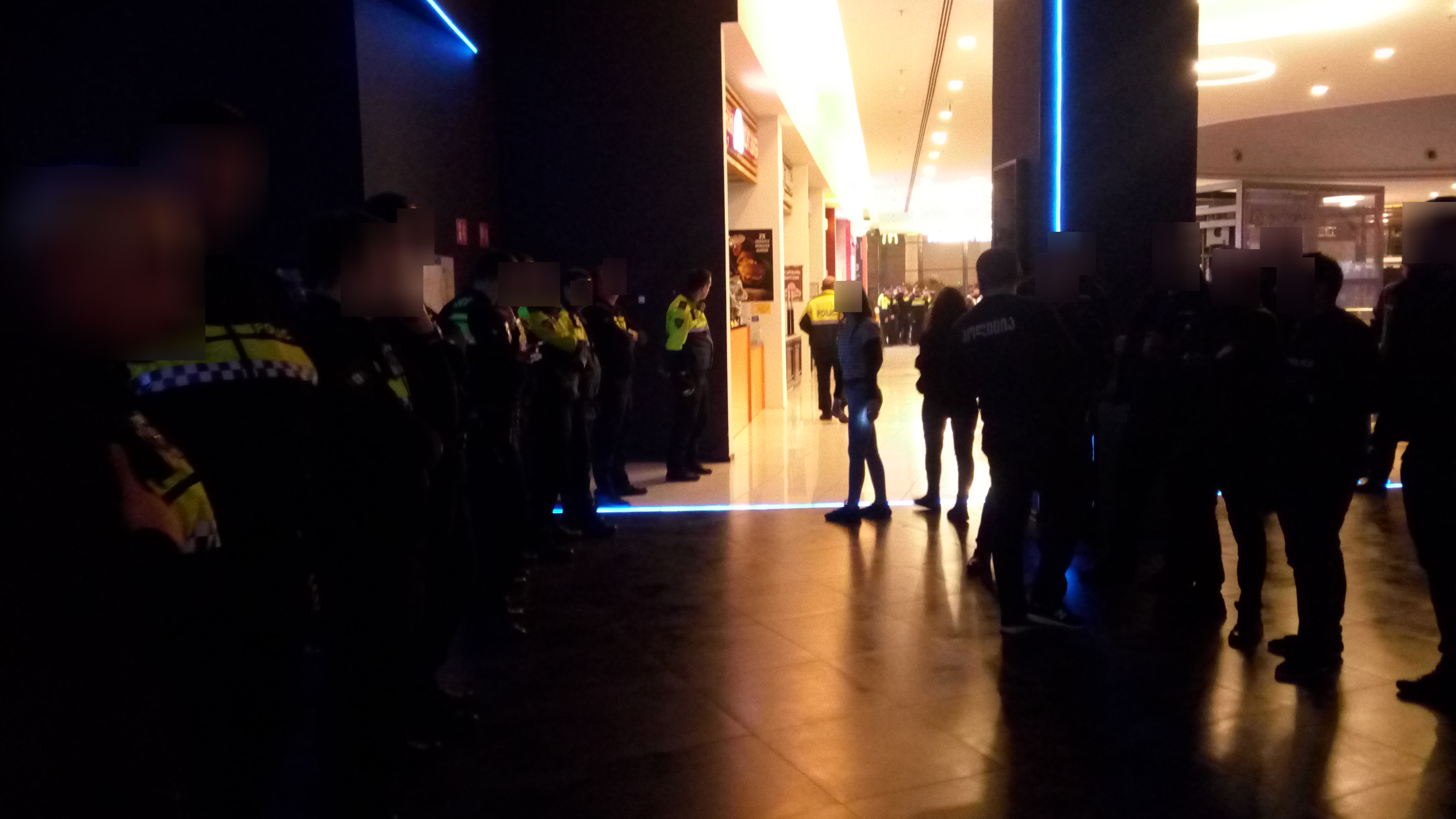
Georgian police reinforcement at the second protection line during the premiere of the film

Ultra-conservative groups threatened to cancel the screening of the film in Tbilisi and Batumi, Georgia. The head of the Children Protection Public Movement Levan Palavandishvili, plus Levan Vasadze, Dimitri Lortkipanidze, and the leader of ultra-nationalist movement Georgian March Sandro Bregadze, announced they would picket the cinemas to protest against the showing of the film "which is against Georgian and Christian traditions and values, and popularises the sin of sodomy".

The director of the film, Levan Akin, responded to the threats, saying: "It is absurd that people who bought tickets need to be brave and risk getting harassed or even assaulted just for going to see a film. I made this film with love and compassion." The Georgian Orthodox Church disapproved of the film premiere but also stated that the “church distances itself from any violence.”

On 8 November 2019, the Ministry of Internal Affairs of Georgia mobilized police troops at the Amirani Cinema and nearby streets and placed special riot police troops near to the Philharmonic Hall. Police officers surrounded the entrance to the Amirani Cinema. Later that day several hundred members of Georgian March attempted to break the police cordon and forcibly enter the Amirani Cinema, but were stopped by the police. Some of the protesters wore masks and used pyrotechnics. Despite the attempts, all screenings of the film took place as planned.

The police detained two persons and accused them of violating Article 173 of the Code of Administrative Offences of Georgia (disobedience of lawful order of a police officer) and Article 166 (hooliganism). One of the leaders of the Republican Party of Georgia, Davit Berdzenishvili, was attacked by the protesters. Civil activist Ana Subeliani was also heavily injured in a clash with protesters and taken to hospital.

== See also ==
- List of submissions to the 92nd Academy Awards for Best International Feature Film
- List of Swedish submissions for the Academy Award for Best International Feature Film
