= Levan Gelbakhiani =

Georgian actor (born 1997)

- ლევან გელბახიანი
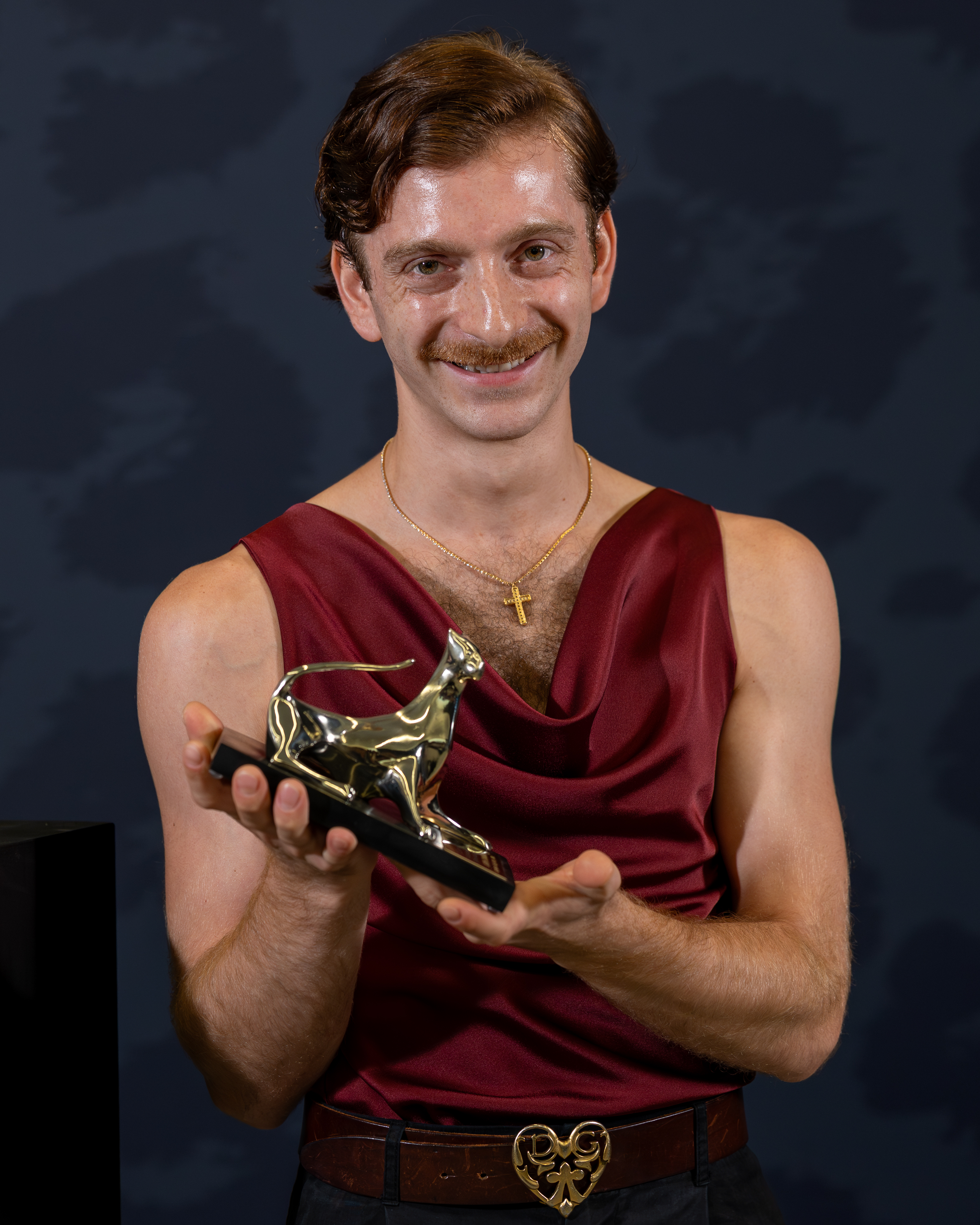
- Gelbakhiani at the 2025 Locarno Film Festival
- Born: 30 December 1997 (age 28); Chiatura, Georgia
- Occupations: Actor; dancer
- Years active: 2019–present
- Known for: And Then We Danced

Levan Gelbakhiani (Georgian: ლევან გელბახიანი; born 30 December 1997) is a Georgian actor and dancer. He is best known for playing Merab in the 2019 film And Then We Danced.

== Personal life ==
Gelbakhiani was born on 30 December 1997 in Chiatura, Georgia. He speaks Georgian, Russian, and English.

== Career ==
Before beginning his film career, Gelbakhiani had an extensive background in dance. He began learning Georgian dance at the age of four and later became involved in contemporary dance, particularly contact improvisation. He also worked with Georgian and international artists through the Tbilisi Contemporary Dance and Experimental Art Festival. Gelbakhiani has described contemporary dance as the style closest to him and said that performing traditional Georgian dance for And Then We Danced required him to work in a markedly different, stricter style.

His dance background led indirectly to his acting debut. Director Levan Akin discovered Gelbakhiani through Instagram and cast him as Merab in And Then We Danced (2019), despite his having no previous professional acting experience. The film had its world premiere in the Directors' Fortnight section at the 2019 Cannes Film Festival. His performance brought him several acting awards, including the Heart of Sarajevo for Best Actor at the Sarajevo Film Festival.

In 2020, Gelbakhiani was selected as one of ten European Shooting Stars by European Film Promotion and was presented at the 70th Berlin International Film Festival.

In 2025, Gelbakhiani returned to a leading film role as Jonah in Jacqueline Zünd's science-fiction drama Don't Let the Sun. The film premiered at the 78th Locarno Film Festival, where Gelbakhiani received the Pardo for Best Performance.

In 2026, he portrayed Soviet-born pianist Youri Egorov in Sander Burger's biographical drama Youri, opposite Joes Brauers as writer Jan Brokken. The film, based on Brokken's autobiographical book In het huis van de dichter, opened the 28th Film by the Sea festival on 11 September 2026.

== Filmography ==
Year	Title	Role	Notes
2019	And Then We Danced	Merab	World premiere in the Directors' Fortnight section of the 2019 Cannes Film Festival on 16 May 2019.
2025	Don't Let the Sun	Jonah	Premiered at the 78th Locarno Film Festival
2026	Youri	Youri	Premiered as the opening film of the 28th Film by the Sea festival on 11 September 2026.

== Awards and nominations ==
Year	Award	Category	Nominated work	Result
2019	European Film Awards	Best Actor	And Then We Danced	Nominated
2019	Listapad	Best Actor	And Then We Danced	Won
2019	New Mexico Film Critics Award	Best Actor	And Then We Danced	Won
2019	Odesa International Film Festival	Best Acting	And Then We Danced	Won
2019	Sarajevo Film Festival	Best Actor	And Then We Danced	Won
2019	Valladolid International Film Festival	Best Actor	And Then We Danced	Won
2020	Shooting Stars Award		And Then We Danced	Won
2020	Guldbagge Awards	Best Actor in a Leading Role	And Then We Danced	Won
2025	Locarno Film Festival	Pardo for Best Performance	Don't Let the Sun	Won
