= En del av mitt hjärta =

Single by Tomas Ledin

from the album Tillfälligheternas spel
- A-side: "En del av mitt hjärta"
- B-side: "En del av mitt hjärta" ("Efter midnatt", acoustic version)
- Released: 1994
- Genre: Swedish pop
- Label: The Record Station
- Songwriter: Tomas Ledin
- Producers: Lasse Anderson, Tomas Ledin

Tomas Ledin singles chronology
"En samlingsmix" (1990)	"En del av mitt hjärta" (1994)	"Hon gör allt för att göra mig lycklig" (1990)

"En del av mitt hjärta" is a song written by Tomas Ledin, and recorded by himself on 1990 album, Tillfälligheternas spel. The song won a Grammis award in the "Song of the year 1990" category.

The single peaked at second position on the Swedish singles chart. The song also charted at Svensktoppen for 27 weeks between 21 October 1990 – 5 May 1991.

== Charts ==
Chart (1990)	Peak position
Europe (Eurochart Hot 100)	73
Sweden (Sverigetopplistan)	2
