= Sture Bergwall =

Swedish alleged serial killer

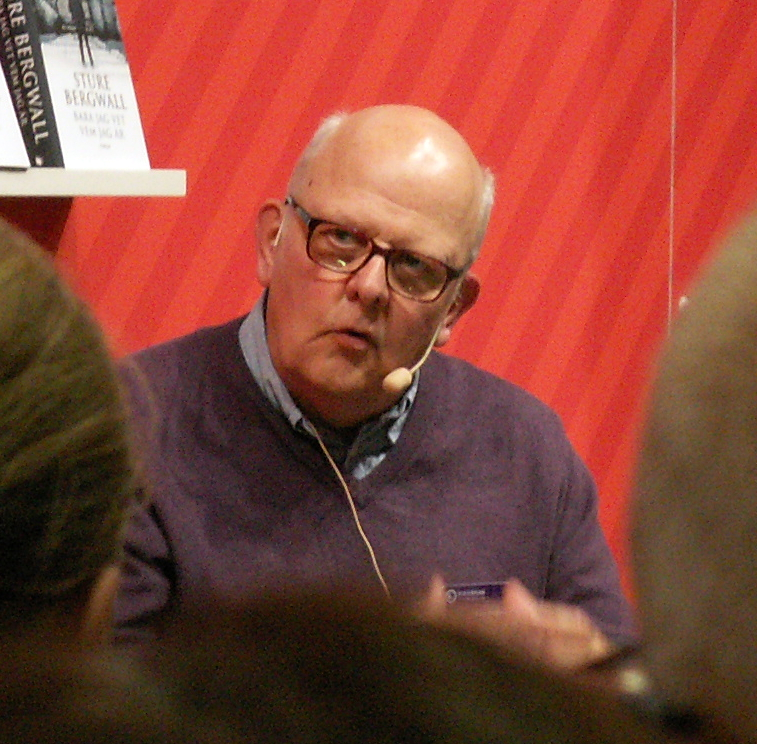
- Sture Bergwall in 2016.
- Born: Sture Ragnar Bergwall; 26 April 1950 (age 76); Korsnäs, Falun, Sweden
- Other names: Thomas Quick; Sätermannen ("the Säter Man")
- Relatives: Sten-Ove Bergwall (brother)
- Status: Released (2014)
- Conviction: Murder (later exonerated)
- Penalty: Institutional psychiatric care

Details
- Victims: 30+ claimed
- Span of crimes: 1964–1993
- Country: Sweden, Norway, Denmark, and Finland

Sture Ragnar Bergwall (born 26 April 1950), also known as Thomas Quick from 1993–2002, is a Swedish man previously believed to have been a serial killer, having confessed to more than 30 murders while detained in a mental institution for personality disorders. Between 1994 and 2001, Quick was convicted of eight of these murders. However, he withdrew all of his confessions in 2008. As a result, his murder convictions were quashed, the final one in July 2013, and he was released from the hospital.

The episode raised issues about how murder convictions could have been obtained on such weak evidence, and has been called the largest miscarriage of justice in Swedish history. Journalists Hannes Råstam and Jenny Küttim and Dan Josefsson published TV documentaries and books about the murder cases; they claimed that bad therapy led to false confessions. Dan Josefsson claims that a "cult"-like group led by psychologist Margit Norell manipulated the police and talked Sture Bergwall into false confessions.

== Early life ==
Bergwall grew up in Korsnäs with his six siblings. He adopted his mother's maiden name, Quick, around 1991. After a history of criminal behavior (molestation of boys and various assaults and drug use), Quick was sentenced in 1991 for armed robbery. He also stabbed a man while in outpatient treatment from a psychiatric facility.

== Confessions and convictions of murder ==
After the robbery conviction, Quick was confined to care in an institution for the criminally insane. When the clinic considered him ready for release, Quick became fearful of returning to ordinary life and anxious about leaving the institution. Wanting to remain there, he began telling stories of childhood abuse and recovered memories of having committed murders. These accounts brought him significant attention and status within the institution, while also reinforcing the psychiatrists’ theories and beliefs. According to his therapist Birgitta Ståhle, he had multiple personalities with names such as Ellington–who was the evil murderer–Nana, and Cliff. She believed his case could have major implications for criminal psychology and trauma theory. Bergwall later claimed that these personalities emerged during therapy through interaction with his therapist, and that he adopted and developed them to satisfy her expectations, which in turn reinforced her belief in their existence.

During therapy, he confessed to more than 30 murders committed in Sweden, Norway, Denmark, and Finland between 1964 and 1993. The therapy sessions were followed by police interviews. One of his confessions led to the apparent solving of an 18-year-old murder considered to be unsolvable, and another to the apparent informal solving of a murder in Växjö in 1964. This 1964 crime was outside the then 25-year statute of limitations in Sweden, but with the information given by Quick, the case was considered closed.

With no eyewitnesses or technical forensic evidence to connect him to the crimes, Quick was convicted solely on the basis of his own confessions while undergoing recovered-memory therapy on benzodiazepines followed by police interrogations. Details in the confessions were wildly wrong and Quick relied on hints and body language from his interrogators to guess the answers expected of him. Bergwall/Quick had been researching unsolved murders on microfilm in the Royal Library, Stockholm when he was on day release.

Consequently, his confession to a murder in Norway led to a Norwegian newspaper writing his story. Quick requested back copies including earlier reports of the story from Norwegian journalists that included details hitherto unknown to the Swedish police, leading them to believe that only the perpetrator knew them.

Nine-year-old Therese Johannessen had disappeared from Fjell, Drammen, Norway, in 1988 and was still missing. Ten years later Quick was convicted of murdering her. The crucial evidence was the discovery of fragments from what was believed to be burnt bone fragments of the girl. However, in 2012, laboratory tests showed that the supposed bone fragments were composed of wood and glue fused together — probably hardboard. An analysis had not been performed before the evidence was presented to the court.

Examination of his answers showed that his initial attempts to provide answers to questions concerning (for example) murder weapons and birthmarks were wrong, leading questions were asked in police interviews, and the initial erroneous guesses edited out of the version presented to the court.

The involvement of therapists meant that Quick's early failure to provide anything more than a vague, confused and vacillating picture that gradually sharpened and focused was explained away as the result of repressed memories being retrieved as a result of therapy; e.g. in the judgment for the case of Therese one can read that the psychologist Christianson told the court that "Traumatic events are retained in the memory but there can be protective mechanisms that work in the unconscious to repress their recall." Similar arguments about Quick's "repressed" memories recur again and again in the judgments.

The credibility of Quick's confessions was widely debated in the Swedish media. Critics of these confessions, and the trials, including a policeman involved in one of the investigations, wrote that there was no evidence that tied Quick to any of the murders he had confessed, and that until he could show something he had taken that belonged to one of his victims, the probability was that he was a compulsive liar. In a December 2008 television interview with Hannes Råstam, Quick denied taking part either in any of the murders for which he had been sentenced or in the more than 30 murders he had confessed to.

Because the only evidence to support the convictions were his own confessions, that he now retracted, and nothing else remained on which to base the judgments, Quick changed his lawyer and the eight murder convictions handed down in six trials were all quashed on appeal, the last one in July 2013. Quick, who now reverted to his birth name of Sture Bergwall, was released from custody after having been confined for more than twenty years in an institution for the criminally insane, with conditions that he refrain from alcohol and narcotics.

Between 1994 and 2001, Quick was convicted of eight murders (in chronological order) at six different District Court trials:

- Charles Zelmanovits, Piteå 1976, sentenced in 1994 – no forensic evidence, except for the confession. Sentence quashed: July 2013
- Johan Asplund, Sundsvall, 1980, sentenced in 2001 – no body, no forensics except for the confession. Sentence quashed: March 2012.
- The Stegehuis couple, Appojaure (Gällivare) 1984, sentenced in 1996 – no forensics, but Quick gave information regarding facts that had never been disclosed to the public. His confessions were later questioned, as Quick seemed to have been privy to all information before the trial – retrial granted by the Supreme Court. Sentence quashed: May 2013.
- Yenon Levi, tourist from Israel, Rörshyttan, 1988, sentenced in 1997 – no forensic evidence, but statements included in Quick's testimony such as his incorrect guesses at the murder weapon (in the police interviews, Quick guessed a camping axe, a spade and a car jack before arriving at the correct answer – a wooden club). The incorrect guesses were not mentioned in court. Sentence quashed: September 2010.
- Therese Johannesen, Drammen, Norway, 1988, sentenced in 1998 – bone fragments presented as forensic evidence turned out to be hardboard. Sentence quashed: March 2011.
- Trine Jensen, Oslo, 1981, sentenced in 2000 – no forensic evidence. Sentence quashed: September 2012.
- Gry Storvik, Oslo, 1985 – no forensic evidence, confession; the semen found in the victim did not belong to Quick. Sentence quashed: September 2012.

In Sweden a defendant always gains access to the full police investigation prior to the trial. Quick's lawyer Claes Borgström has been criticised for failing to protect his mentally disturbed client's objective interest in being judged not guilty.

== Confessions and subsequent withdrawals ==
In the years following 1990, when Quick was sentenced to closed psychiatric confinement, he confessed to several well publicised unsolved murders. His first murder, according to his own accounts, occurred in Växjö in 1964, when Quick was only 14 years old. The victim, Tomas Blomgren, was described by Quick as being the same age but not as strong and tall as himself. At the time of his confession, the murder was already subject to the statute of limitations which Bergwall/Quick later admitted was a reason for confessing; but later, it transpired that Quick had a watertight alibi. On the day of the murder he was attending his own confirmation with his family at the Pentecostal Church in Falun, almost 500 kilometers from Växjö where the murder took place.

The second alleged victim was Alvar Larsson, whom Quick claimed to have murdered at Sirkön in the lake Åsnen outside the town of Urshult. According to Quick's sister, Quick never left Falun at the time of the murder.

The credibility of Quick's confessions had been widely debated in the Swedish media since 1993, up until 2008, when Quick withdrew all of his confessions. There were consistent doubts about the reliability of his statements, and some of his confessions were proven to be fabrications; e.g. the two African refugees Quick confessed to murdering in Norway were found to be alive and well.

A DNA sample from a crime in Norway was subsequently found to be a mismatch, and there was no technical forensic evidence to link Quick to any of the crimes. Another dubious circumstance is the fact that no witnesses have ever testified to seeing Quick in the proximity of any of the crime scenes, even though more than 10,000 people were interviewed for intricate details.

Critics of these confessions and the trials claim that Quick never murdered anyone, but that he is a compulsive liar. Among the critics are the parents of a child he confessed to having murdered in the late 1970s. In response to these accusations, Quick himself wrote an article for the Swedish newspaper Dagens Nyheter in 2001 in which he said that he refused to cooperate further with the authorities concerning all open murder investigations.

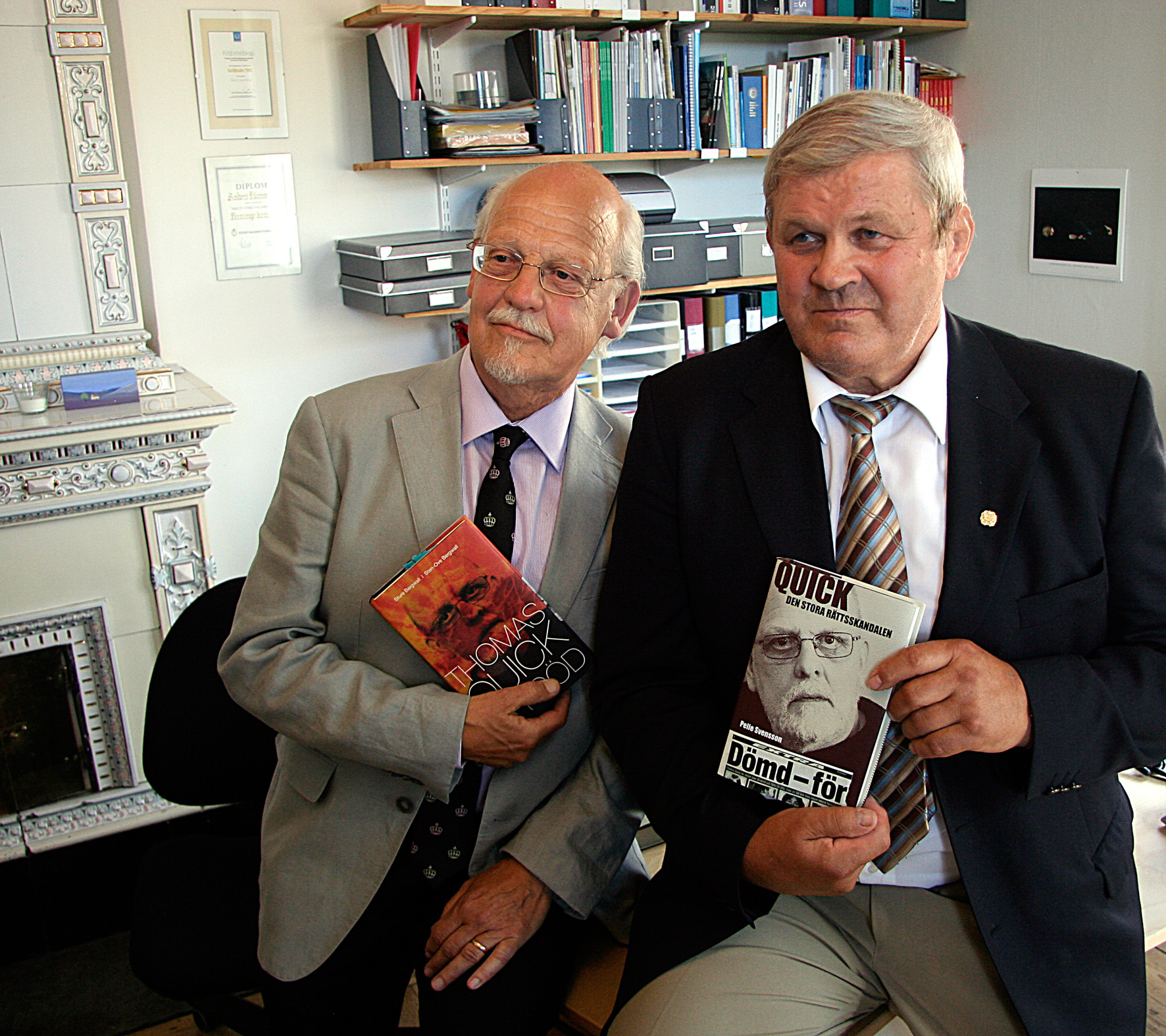
May 2009: Quick's brother Sten-Ove Bergwall and lawyer Pelle Svensson with the books they authored, in which they criticise the Swedish authorities' handling of the Thomas Quick cases.

In November 2006, Thomas Quick's trials were reported to the Swedish Chancellor of Justice by retired lawyer Pelle Svensson on behalf of the parents of a murder victim who wished to have the trials declared invalid. Several principals in the fields of law and psychiatry, among them Swedish criminologist and television crime commentator Leif G. W. Persson and two police officers involved in the investigation of the murders who refused to involve themselves further in the investigations all claim that Quick has a history of mental illness, but it was unlikely he was guilty of any of the crimes to which he had confessed. The handling of the Quick cases has been described as the "most scandalous" chapter of Scandinavian crime history, branding it as glaring incompetence, naiveté, and opportunism within the police and judicial system.

Quick withdrew all of his confessions in 2008 during the recording of a TV documentary, made by prize-winning investigative journalist Hannes Råstam, who died shortly before his book version was published.

Quick's attorney contended that the prosecution withheld important investigative material from the defence (which the prosecution adamantly denied). Quick's attorney claimed that his client is mentally ill and was being given prescription drugs (benzodiazepine) when he confessed to the killings. These arguments were some of the grounds for quashing all the eight murder convictions in six trials and six appeals.

Thomas Quick, now having reverted to his birth name Sture Bergwall, recanted his confessions and requested the Svea Court of Appeal order a new trial for the murder case of Yenon Levi at Rörshyttan. In December 2009, the court of appeal granted a retrial of the Yenon Levi case. In the judgment, the court found that the lower court had heard that Quick correctly identified the murder weapon. However, information had been withheld from the court that initially Quick had made many erroneous attempts to identify the murder weapon before finally giving an account that corresponded with police findings.

Quick moved for a judgment of acquittal, and was acquitted in September 2010. Quick's counsel also declared his intention to ask for a retrial of the Therese Johannesen case, claiming that Quick had an alibi for the day when Therese Johannesen was abducted and murdered. SKL (Statens Kriminaltekniska Laboratorium eng. National Swedish Laboratory of Forensic Science (Swedish National Forensic Centre)) found in March 2010 that two exhibits claimed by the prosecution to be bone fragments were, in fact, pieces of hardboard. A retrial was granted, and Quick formally acquitted when the prosecutor dropped the charges.

On 30 July 2013, Quick was acquitted of the last of eight murder convictions.

Sture Bergwall has been released from Säter's institution for the criminally insane and most of the treatment plan has been made confidential and subject to secrecy. However, from the uncensored portions released to the press, it is apparent that Bergwall has not taken medication for several years and is assessed as not requiring any.

== Film and television ==
A 2015 documentary film, The Confessions of Thomas Quick, recounted Bergwall's life and his murder confessions and retractions, including interviews with Bergwall and other participants in the events. In it Bergwall explained that he made the confessions to gain attention due to profound loneliness. The documentary claims that Bergwall knew little about each murder, but was fed details during questioning, enabling him to build up enough information to persuade people he had carried them out. It also claims that as a result of his confessions Bergwall was given privileged treatment in the hospital, including drugs and therapy on demand, his own office with computer and Internet access, and restaurant meals when going out to visit murder sites, and that this may have encouraged him to continue confessing to more and more crimes.

A television drama series called Det som göms i snö (lit. What is Hidden in Snow) aired on Swedish television in 2018, directed by Kjell-Åke Andersson with Robert Gustafsson in the lead role as a police cold case investigator. Inspired by the Thomas Quick story, it was released in English in 2020 on various on-demand platforms as The Truth Will Out.

The Mikael Håfström thriller film The Perfect Patient premiered in Sweden in 2019, with David Dencik as Thomas Quick and Jonas Karlsson as the journalist Hannes Råstam.

== See also ==
- Henry Lee Lucas, an American serial killer, many of whose (approximately 600) confessions are now believed to be fabricated
- Bruno Lüdke
