= David Dencik =

Swedish-Danish actor

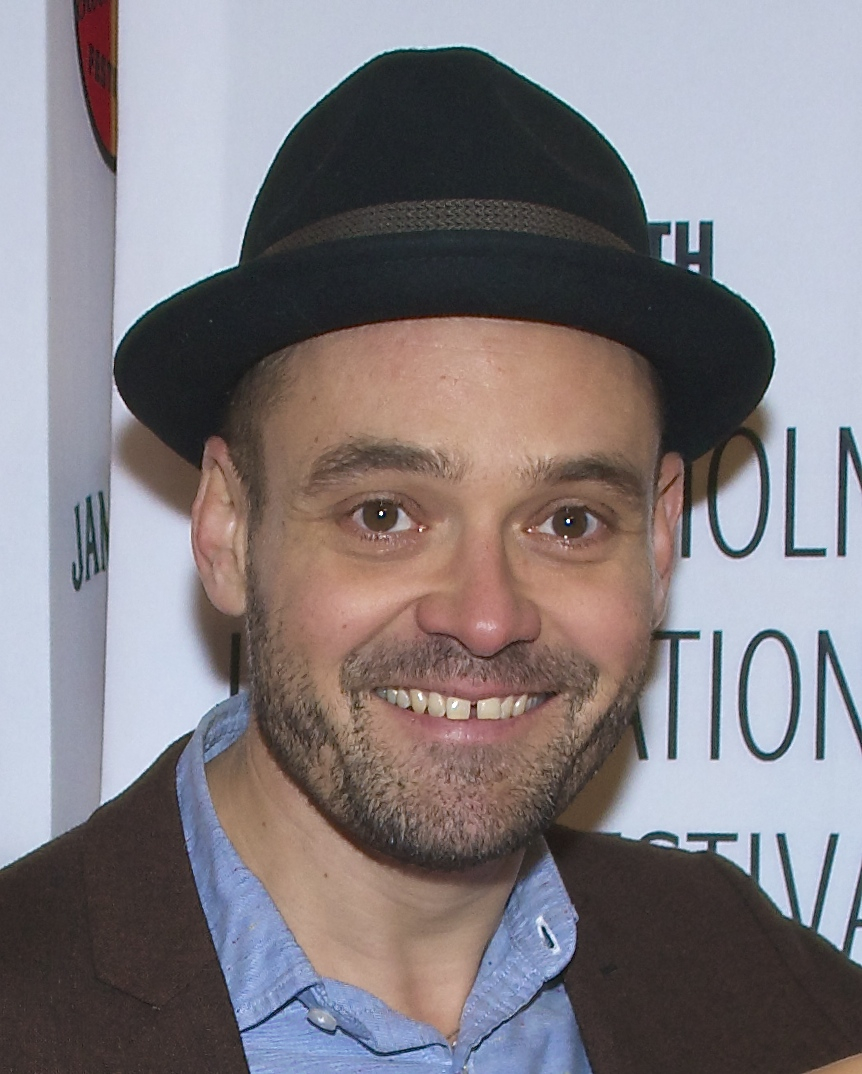
- Dencik in 2014
- Born: Karl David Sebastian Dencik; 31 October 1974 (age 52); Stockholm, Sweden
- Occupation: Actor
- Years active: 2003–present
- Spouse: Sofie Dencik (2012-2025; divorced)
- Children: 2

Karl David Sebastian Dencik (Slovak pronunciation: [ˈdentʂiːk]; born 31 October 1974) is a Swedish-Danish actor. He has acted in both Swedish and Danish films, his break-through in Sweden being his role in the mini-series Lasermannen and has then had major roles in English-language films and series including Tinker Tailor Soldier Spy (2011), The Girl with the Dragon Tattoo (2011), Top of the Lake (2017), McMafia (2018), Chernobyl (2019), the James Bond film No Time to Die (2021), and the DC Universe film Clayface (2026).

Dencik is a twice Robert Award winner, for Best Actor in a Leading Role for A Soap (2006) and Best Actor in a Supporting Television Role for The Chestnut Man (2021). He won a Guldbagge Award for Best Supporting Actor for The Perfect Patient (2019). He is also a seven-time Bodil Award nominee.

== Early life and education ==
Karl David Sebastian Dencik was born 31 October 1974 in Stockholm, Sweden, to Swedish parents: Lars Dencik, a social psychologist and Kerstin Allrot, a former film historian and producer. His last name is Slovak and comes from his paternal grandfather, who left Liptovský Mikuláš, Czechoslovakia, for asylum in Sweden to escape the Nazi persecution of Jews in Slovakia in 1939.

The family moved to Denmark in 1976, where Dencik spent his childhood. As a teenager he studied in Brazil, where he discovered capoeira, the Brazilian martial art that combines elements of dance and music. The dance aspect of capoeira led him to take an interest in theatre.

In 1999, Dencik moved to Stockholm to study at the Swedish National Academy of Mime and Acting (Teaterhögskolan), where he graduated in 2003.

== Career ==
Dencik first performed on stage, including a role in A Midsummer Night's Dream at the Royal Dramatic Theatre in Stockholm.

Dencik's first film appearance was a bartender in the 2003 film Reconstruction by Christoffer Boe. After several minor roles in films, he became an established actor in Sweden for his lead role as real-life far-right serial killer John Ausonius in the three-part mini-series Lasermannen in 2005. The mini-series received praise by Swedish critics and viewers as "one of, if not the best", most well-made true crime and political drama production in Swedish modern film history. The whole cast received praise but especially Dencik's acting was called "uniquely brilliant".

In 2006, he played the transsexual Veronica in Pernille Fischer Christensen's A Soap, for which he received the Robert Award for Best Actor.

Also in 2006, he starred in the comedy Everything About My Bush (known as Allt om min buske in Swedish). In 2007, he appeared in the Danish feature film Daisy Diamond, directed by Simon Staho.

He portrayed Fred Åkerström in the 2010 biographical film Cornelis. In 2011, he appeared in the Hollywood adaptation of The Girl with the Dragon Tattoo and played Toby Esterhase in the film Tinker Tailor Soldier Spy.

He also starred in the gay-themed Brotherhood and the Dimension Films thriller Regression. In 2017, he played brothel owner Alexander "Puss" Braun in Jane Campion's acclaimed Top of the Lake. McMafia (2018) saw Dencik play Russian boss Uncle Boris Godman, inspired by the book McMafia: A Journey Through the Global Criminal Underworld (2008) by journalist Misha Glenny.

In 2019, Dencik played Mikhail Gorbachev in HBO's miniseries Chernobyl.

Dencik then portrayed a rogue scientist, Valdo Obruchev, in the James Bond film No Time to Die (2021).

In August 2024, it was reported that Dencik had joined the cast of the crime thriller television series The Assassin.

In March 2025, Dencik appeared as the titular mad monk in the music video for ‘Satanized’ by the legendary Swedish rock/metal band, Ghost (Swedish band).

== Personal life ==
Dencik was married to Danish lawyer Sofie Dencik from 2012 to 2025. They lived together in Copenhagen and have two children.

In September 2026, Dencik announced that he was in a relationship with Danish actress Signe Skov.

== Selected filmography ==
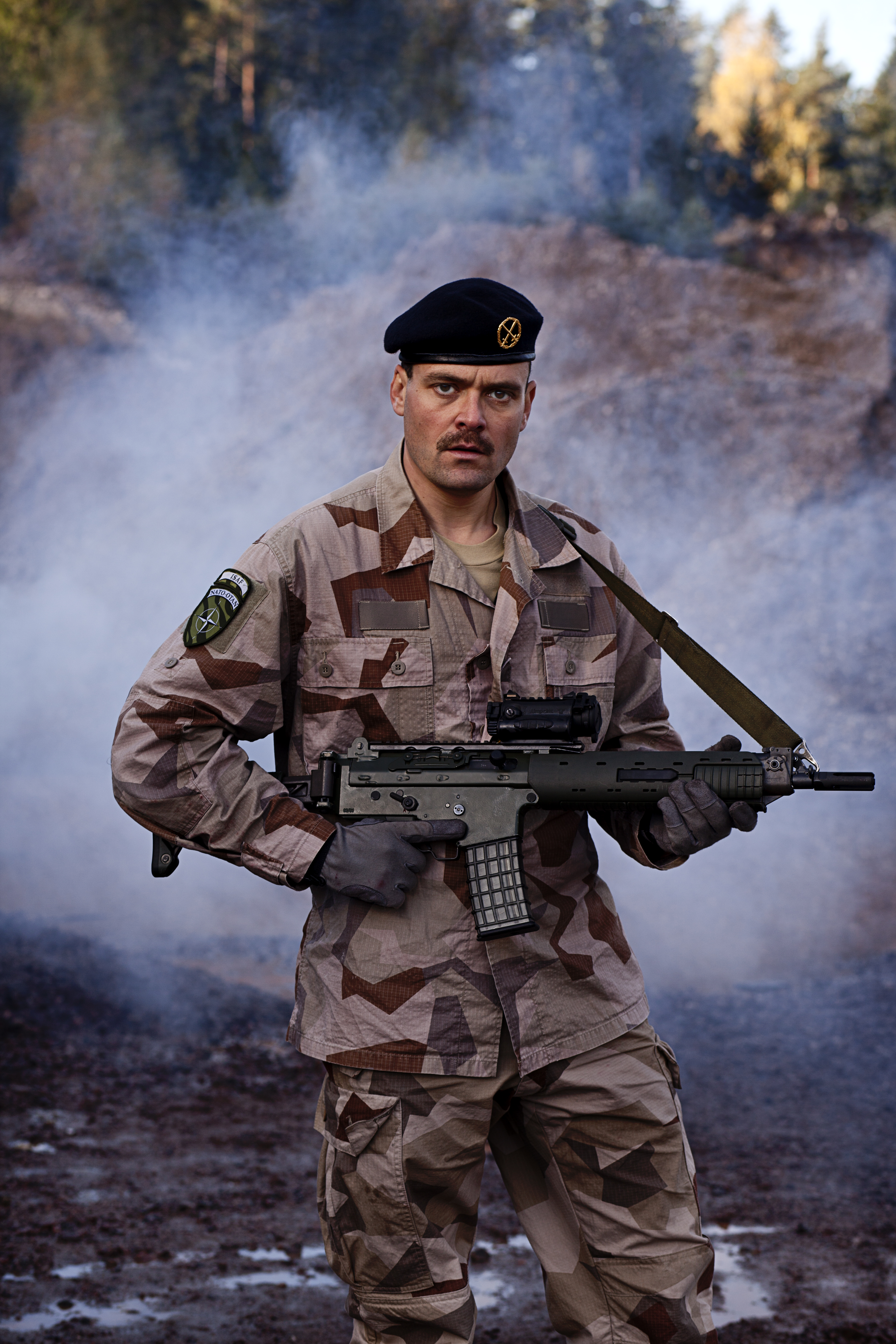
Dencik in Mission 1325

=== Film ===
Year	Title	Role	Notes
2003	Reconstruction	Bartender	
2006	A Soap	Veronica	
2007	All About My Bush	Henning	
2007	Daisy Diamond	Jens	
2008	Not Like Others	Taxi Driver	
2009	The Girl with the Dragon Tattoo	Janne Dahlman	Swedish version
2009	Brotherhood	Jimmy	
2010	Rosa Morena	Jakob	
2011	War Horse	German Base Camp Officer	
2011	Room 304	Martin	
2011	Rebounce	Marcel	
2011	Tinker Tailor Soldier Spy	Toby Esterhase	
2011	The Girl with the Dragon Tattoo	Young Morell	English version
2012	A Royal Affair	Ove Høegh-Guldberg	
2012	All That Matters Is Past	Ruud	
2012	Hamilton: In the Interest of the Nation	Deputy Prime Minister of Sweden	
2013	We Are the Best!	Klara's father	
2014	The Absent One	Ulrik Dybbøl	
2014	Serena	Mr. Buchanan	
2015	Regression	John Gray	
2015	Men & Chicken	Gabriel	
2016	Across the Waters	Arne Itkin	
2017	Backstabbing for Beginners	Rasnetsov	
2017	The Snowman	Dr Idar Vetlesen	
2019	Waiting for the Barbarians	The Clerk	
2019	The Perfect Patient	Thomas Quick	
2021	No Time to Die	Valdo Obruchev	
2022	Black Crab	Colonel Raad	
2022	Diorama	Björn	
2022	Attachment	Lev	
2022	The Kiss	Dr. Faber	
2023	Together 99 (Tillsammans 99)	Peter	
2026	Clayface	Markos Szabo	

=== Television ===
Year	Title	Role	Notes
2005	Lasermannen	John Ausonius	3 episodes
2011–2012	Lykke	Professor Anders Assing	18 episodes
2013	The Borgias	Cardinal Orsini	2 episodes
2016	Follow the Money	Simon Absalonsen	10 episodes
2017	Top of the Lake: China Girl	Puss	6 episodes
2017	Genius	Niels Bohr	3 episodes
2018	McMafia	Boris Godman	2 episodes
2019	Quicksand	Peder Sander	6 episodes
2019	Chernobyl	Mikhail Gorbachev	3 episodes
2019	Face to Face	Rylander	2 episodes
2021	The Chestnut Man	Simon Genz	6 episodes
2022	The Ipcress File	Colonel Stok	6 episodes
2022	Love & Anarchy	Filip	1 episode
2022	The Kingdom	Bosse	3 episodes
2022	Vuxna människor	Nathan	8 episodes
2023	Huset	Henrik	6 episodes
2024	Families like Ours	Peter	4 episodes
2025	The Assassin	Jasper de Voogdt	5 episodes
2026	Star City	Maxim Tarasov	5 episodes

=== Music videos ===
Year	Title	Role	Notes
2025	"Satanized"	Mad Monk	Ghost

== Awards and nominations ==
- 2006: Winner of the Danish Robert Award for Best Actor in a Leading Role, for his role in A Soap
- 2011: Nominated, Guldbagge Award for Best Actor in a Supporting Role
- 2014: Nominated, Guldbagge Award for Best Actor in a Supporting Role
- 2015: Nominated, Guldbagge Award for Best Actor in a Leading Role
- 2020: Winner, Guldbagge Award for Best Actor in a Supporting Role
