= Hannes Råstam =

Swedish journalist

Hannes Råstam (1955 – 12 January 2012) was a Swedish journalist. He was the host of SVT's Uppdrag granskning a program featuring investigative journalism. He was awarded the Prix Italia in 2001, the Golden Nymph in 2006, and the FIPA d'Or also in 2006.

He joined SVT as a journalist in 1993 after a career as a musician in the 1970s. He started working on Uppdrag granskning in the early 2000s. Råstam's programmes about convicted serial killer Thomas Quick where he retracted his own confessions caused eight murder convictions to be overturned.

Hannes Råstam died of cancer of the liver and pancreas on 12 January 2012, aged 56.

== Filmography ==
- Ett år efter skotten (2002)
- Varför erkände dom? (2008)
- Thomas Quick, del 1: Säters Hemlighet (2009)
- Thomas Quick, del 2: Berättaren (2009)
- Thomas Quick: Så skapas en seriemördare (2010)
- Göteborgskravallerna - tio år senare (2011)

== Bibliography ==
- Fallet Thomas Quick: att skapa en seriemördare (2012)
