= The Sandhamn Murders =

Swedish crime drama TV series

- Also known as: Sandhamn Murders
- Genre: drama
- Based on: Morden i Sandhamn (2008) by Viveca Sten
- Written by: Sara Heldt; Thomas Borgström; Hans Rosenfeldt; Camilla Ahlgren; Martin Asphaug; Daniel Alfredson; Birgitta Bongenhielm; Katarina Ewers; Johan Widerberg; Mattias Ohlsson; Martin Cronström; Gustaf Skördeman
- Directed by: Marcus Olsson; Niklas Ohlson; Mattias Ohlsson
- Starring: Alexandra Rapaport; Jakob Cedergren (seasons 1–6); Nicolai Cleve Broch (seasons 7–present); Sandra Andreis; Jonas Malmsjö; Anki Lidén
- Country of origin: Sweden
- Original language: Swedish
- No. of seasons: 11
- No. of episodes: 55 (list of episodes)

Production
- Producers: Martin Cronström; Anders Landström; Åsa Sjöberg; Pelle Mellqvist; Bo Persson; Sean Wheelan
- Running time: 45 min. (per single episode); 90 min. (per double episode)
- Production company: Filmlance International

Original release
- Network: TV4; C More Film
- Release: 20 December 2010 – present

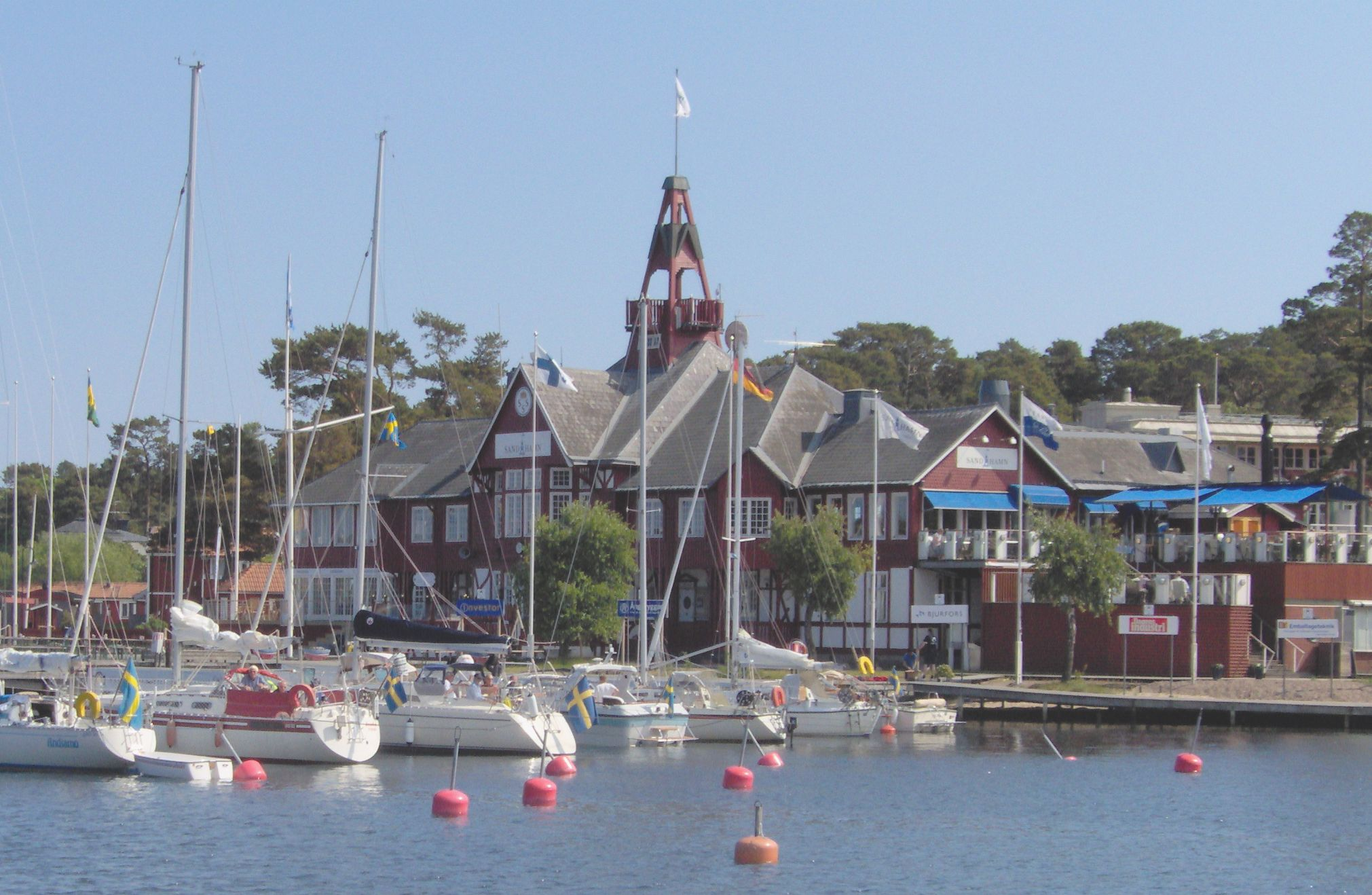
Sandhamn hotel in the Stockholm archipelago. 2005

The Sandhamn Murders (Swedish: Morden i Sandhamn) is a Swedish crime drama television series. It is based on the book series of the same name by writer Viveca Sten, with later seasons set in Sten's fictional universe. The series is broadcast on TV4, which has screened 11 seasons since December 2010.

The series follows Nora Linde (Alexandra Rapaport), a lawyer who owns a summer house on Sandhamn, and her assistance in solving various murders on or near that island. Portraying Nora's children, Simon and Anna, are real-life siblings, Lion Monn and Ping Monn, respectively. The first six seasons featured Thomas Andreasson (Jakob Cedergren) of the Nacka police as the lead detective. From season seven, Alexander Forsman (Nicolai Cleve Broch) is the new lead detective.

Seasons one to five comprise three episodes per season, each covering one investigation arc. For seasons six and seven there were eight episodes each, with two parts per investigation. Seasons six and seven were broadcast as four double-episodes on C More Film and eight single episodes on TV4. In August 2020 TV4 announced that an eighth season was in production. It was broadcast from 8 August 2022 on C More as three double episodes each covering a story arc and as six single episodes. Season 9 was broadcast as six single episodes in April and May 2023, and season 10 as six episodes in August 2024. Season 11 was broadcast in six episodes in August 2025.

Seasons one to five (as Sandhamn Murders) were broadcast from May 2021 on Australian network SBS-TV's streaming service, On Demand. Seasons six and seven followed in July 2021 on the same network. Seasons 8 and 9 followed in 2023.

Morden i Sandhamn seasons one to three were released as The Sandhamn Murders, Vol. 1, a box set of 3× DVD, in March 2019. It was issued at the same time as The Sandhamn Murders, Vol. 2, also a box set of 3× DVD, which covers seasons four and six. Both box sets were issued in Swedish with English subtitles. The Swedish television series was remade as a Polish series, Zbrodnia (English: The Crime), which premiered on October 16, 2014.

== Seasons ==
- Season 1: Morden i Sandhamn – I de lugnaste vatten (Still waters) (3 episodes) – 2010
- Season 2: Morden i Sandhamn – I den innersta kretsen (Closed circles) (3 episodes) – 2012
- Season 3: Morden i Sandhamn – I grunden utan skuld (Guiltless) (3 episodes) – 2013
- Season 4: Morden i Sandhamn – I natt är du död (Tonight you're dead) (3 episodes) – 2014
- Season 5: Morden i Sandhamn – I stundens hetta (In the heat of the moment) (3 episodes) – 2015
- Season 6: Morden i Sandhamn – I maktens skugga part 1 and 2 (In the shadow of power), I sanningens namn part 1 and 2 (In the name of truth), I fel sällskap part 1 and 2 (In bad company), I nöd och lust part 1 and 2 (For better or worse) (8 episodes) – 2018
- Season 7: Morden i Sandhamn – Blå lögner part 1 and 2 (Blue lies), Tvillingarna part 1 and 2 (Gemini), Löftet part 1 and 2 (Promise), Vicky part 1 and 2 (8 episodes) – 2020
- Season 8 – Morden i Sandhamn – Angelica part 1 and 2, Lili part 1 and 2, Olivia part 1 and 2 (6 episodes) – 2022
- Season 9 – Morden i Sandhamn – Nadia part 1 and 2, Esther part 1 and 2, Max part 1 and 2 (6 episodes) – 2023
- Season 10 – Morden i Sandhamn – Madeleine part 1 and 2, Nikki & Evelina part 1 and 2, Birgitta part 1 and 2 (6 episodes) – 2024
- Season 11 – Morden i Sandhamn – Linnéa part 1 and 2, Rakel part 1 and 2, Amanda part 1 and 2 (6 episodes) – 2025

== Cast ==
- Alexandra Rapaport as Nora Linde, financial lawyer, works at Nacka bank, owns a Sandhamn summer house, inherits Brandska, Henrik's former wife, Jonas' partner (separated), becomes a prosecutor at Financial Crimes Unit and then at Serious Crimes Unit (Seasons 1–present)
- Jakob Cedergren as Thomas Andreasson, Nacka police lead detective, owns a summer house on Harö (north of Sandhamn), gets back with ex-wife Pernilla, they have a daughter, Elin, separates from Pernilla again, relocates to Copenhagen, when Pernilla and Elin move there (Seasons 1–6)
- Sandra Andreis as Mia Holmgren, Nacka police detective, replaces Carina, owns pet dog Bertil, leaves police force (Seasons 2–6)
- Jonas Malmsjö as Henrik Linde, Nora's ex-husband, yachtsman, medical doctor, Marie's partner, later separated from Marie, has affair with Gisele, marries Gisele, father of Munchkin (Seasons 1-2, 4, 6–present)
- Nicolai Cleve Broch as Alexander Forsman, Swedish-Norwegian, Nacka police lead detective, replaces Thomas, Tor's father, separated from Vicky, reconciled for two years (Seasons 7–present)
- Anki Lidén as Margit Grankvist, Nacka police chief (Seasons 1–6)
- Ping Mon H. Wallén/Ping Monn as Anna Linde, Nora and Henrik's daughter, later has summer jobs as cafe waitress, assistant caterer. Later she moves in with her boyfriend Matte in Marstrand. (Seasons 1–4, 6–7, 9-present) (Note: Ping is the younger sister of Lion, both are children of Cina Wallén and Magnus Henrikson.)
- Gustaf Hammarsten as Bengt-Olof Stenmark, Nacka police chief, replaces Margit, married to Kerstin (Seasons 7–10)
- Marall Nasiri as Rakel, the new police chief (Season 11)
- Lotta Tejle as Claire, Thomas' neighbour on Harö, long-term borrower (Seasons 2–6)
- Louise Edlind as Monica Linde, Henrik's mother (Seasons 1–4, 6, 10)
- Lion Monn/Lion Mon H. Wallén as Simon, Nora and Henrik's son, exchange student to United States (Seasons 1–4, 6, 9) (Note: Lion is the older brother of Ping, both are children of Cina Wallén and Magnus Henrikson.)
- Shirin Golchin as Miriam Biano, Nacka uniform police becomes detective, Alex' partner, leaves Nacka (Seasons 7–8)
- Stefan Gödicke as Jonas Sköld, pilot, Vera's father, rents Brandska, divorces Malin, becomes Nora's partner, leaves after cheating on Nora (Seasons 4–6, 8)
- Ane Dahl Torp as Pernilla Andreasson, Thomas's ex-wife, returns to Nacka, rejoins Thomas on Harö, they have a daughter Elin, she returns to Nacka, later separates from Thomas (Seasons 3–6)
- Anton Lundqvist as Pär, Nora's assistant prosecutor at Financial Crimes Unit, Serious Crimes Unit, becomes Valpen's love interest (Seasons 7–present)
- Julius Fleischanderl as "Valpen" (English: "Puppy"), police rookie, Miriam's replacement, becomes Pär's love interest (Seasons 8–present)
- Lars Amble as Harald, Henrik's father, KSSS board member (Seasons 1–3)
- Sofia Pekkari as Carina Persson, Nacka police detective, goes on maternity leave (Seasons 1–2)
- Saga Samuelsson as Vera Sköld, Jonas' daughter, initially resents Nora's romance with Jonas (Seasons 4–6)
- Johan Hedenberg as Olle Granlund, Sandhamn fisherman, former Coastal Ranger, Anton's father, home handyman (Seasons 4, 6, 8–9)
- Kassel Ulving as Tor Forsman, Alex and Vicky's son, lives on Berit's boat, after reconnecting with Vicky, he leaves to live with Vicky (Seasons 7–10)
- Yasmine Garbi as Gisela, Nora's returned friend, married to Charles, has affair with Henrik, later marries Henrik, mother of Munchkin (Seasons 7–present)
- Malin Crépin as Victoria "Vicky", Alex's estranged wife, abandoned Tor three years earlier, Carl-Johan's daughter with his second wife, reconciled with Alex and Tor, leaves Alex but raises Tor (Seasons 7–8)
- Leona Axelsen as Julia Södergren/Clarissa, catering assistant, bar waitress, becomes a prostitute (Seasons 6–7)
- Johan Hallström as Lennart, Nacka uniform police (Seasons 2–3)
- Ing-Marie Carlsson as Berit, Alex' mother, owns boat (Seasons 7–8)
- Erik Lönngren as Anton Granlund, Olle's son, pyromaniac, on autism spectrum (Seasons 6, 9)
- Johan Widerberg as Sylvester Markell, professional thief, targets high-class victims. (Note: Widerberg has co-written ten episodes including both Angelica episodes, which he acted in) (Seasons 8, 10)
- Viveca Sten as "waitress" (Season 3, Episode 2), "party attendee" (Season 7, Episode 7). (Note: Sten wrote the books upon which the series is based)

=== Season 1 additional cast ===
- Harriet Andersson as Signe Brand, Nora's neighbour, long-term permanent Sandhamn resident, owns a dog Kajsa, Nora inherits her house: Brandska (Note: also referred to as Signe's house/home or Brand Residence/home/house/villa.)
- Andreas Kundler as Jonny Almhult, Sandhamn fisherman, some-time sketch artist, drinks too much
- Lena Nilsson as Kristina "Kicki" Berggren, sister of Krister
- Eva Stellby as Ellen Almhult, Sandhamn resident, widow of Gustav, Jonny's mother
- Lasse Pettersson as Erik Berggren, widower of Cecilia, father of Krister and Kristina

=== Season 2 additional cast ===
- Mats Rudal as Oscar Juliander, bankruptcy lawyer, KSSS board member, sometime yachtsman, corrupt and ruthless
- Gustav Levin as Hans Rosenjöö, retiring KSSS chairman, accepts profits generated by Oscar despite methodology
- Thomas Hanzon as Ingmar van Hahne, prospective KSSS chairman, runs an art gallery
- Catherine Hansson as Sylvia Juliander, mother of Tom, puts up with Oscar's infidelities
- Anne-Li Norberg as Eva, Oscar's secretary
- Malena Engström as Ingrid Dieter, KSSS lawyer, disagrees with Oscar's methodology
- Rebecka Teper as Diana Söder, works for Ingmar, mother of Filip, Oscar's mistress
- Anu Sinisalo as Isabelle van Hahne, Ingmar's wife, has influential connections
- Ylva Lööf as Britta Rosenjöö, Hans' wife, photographed guests at Linde's place

=== Season 3 additional cast ===
- Kenneth Milldoff as Bengt Österman, Sebbe's father, has intergenerational feud with Rosén family, owns a dog, Wille. Sebbe died in a boating accident almost a year earlier
- Eva Fritjofson as Ingrid Österman, Bengt's wife, Sebbe's mother
- Alba August as Lina Rosén, 18-year old, Marianne's daughter, Jakob's girl-friend, Sara's best friend, Sebbe's friend, died a month later, body parts found eight months later
- Marie Delleskog as Marianne Rosén, Lina's mother, has intergenerational feud with Österman family
- Sebastian Hiort af Ornäs as Jakob Sandgren, Sebbe's best friend, on boat when Sebbe died, Lina's and then Sara's boyfriend
- Mikaela Knapp as Sara Hammarsten, Lina's best friend, on boat when Sebbe died, becomes Jakob's girlfriend
- Tomas Norström as Göran Nilsson, Marianne's second ex-husband, Lina's stepdad, boat owner
- Angela Kovács as Hanna Hammarsten, Sara’s mother, dislikes Jakob
- Martin Wallström as Magnus, sailing school instructor
- Elisabet Carlsson as Ulrika Sandgren, Jakob's mother
- Pablo Leiva Wenger as Måns Andersson, gym staff, personal trainer
- Moa Zerpe as Sussi, gym staff, Måns' colleague

=== Season 4 additional cast ===
- Claes Ljungmark as Robert Cronwall, retired Coastal Ranger commander
- Annika Olsson as Annika Melin (née Andersson), Storken pharmacy manager, Pär's sister
- Pierre Tafvelin as Sven Ernskog, Sandhamn delivery man, handyman, former Coastal Ranger (No. 106)
- Mats Blomgren as Bo Kaufman, recluse, has memory loss, former Coastal Ranger (No. 108)
- Lena B. Eriksson as Maria Nielsen, Marcus and David's mother
- Martin Aliaga as Martin Allbäck, Susanna's husband, Jenny's lover
- Katarina Bothéen as Lena Fredell, Jan-Erik's wife
- Sussie Eriksson as Birgitta Cronwall, Robert's wife
- Thomas Hedengran as Anders Martinger, pilot, former Coastal Ranger
- Rikard Björk as David Nielsen, 21 year-old, Marcus' younger brother
- Per Graffman as Leif Kihlbery, former Coastal Ranger
- Tanja Lorentzon as Susanna Allbäck, University Support Adviser, Martin's wife, Marcus' lover
- Camilla Larsson as Elsa Harning, Coastal Rangers training administrator
- Nathalie Söderqvist as Marie, Henrik's new partner

=== Season 5 additional cast ===
- Kajsa Sandberg as Felicia Grimstad, Victor's girlfriend, Ebba's best friend
- Liv Lemoyne as Ebba Halvorsen, Tobbe's ex-girlfriend, Felicia's best friend
- Eliot Waldfogel as Tobias "Tobbe" Högström, Christoffer's younger brother, Arthur's son, Victor's best friend, Ebba's ex-boyfriend
- Pontus Eklöf (actor) as Victor Ekengreen, 16 year-old, Johan and Madeleine's son, Felicia's boyfriend, Tobbe's best friend
- Joel Lützow as Christoffer Högström, 21 year-old business college student, Tobbe's older brother, Arthur's son
- Fredrik Hallgren as Harry, uniform police
- Bisse Unger as Mattias Carlén, Malena's older brother, Ann-Sofie's nephew
- Felix Engström as Johan Ekengreen, Victor's father
- Filip Berg as Patrik Wennergren, convicted drug dealer
- Ann-Charlotte Franzén as Jeanette Grimstad, Felicia's mother
- Marie Robertson as Anna Miller, uniform police
- Ann-Sofie Rase as Madeleine Ekengreen, Johan's wife, Victor's mother
- Clara Christiansson Drake as Malena Carlén, Vera's friend, Mattias' younger sister
- Molly Sehlin as Theresa "Tessan" Almblad, 15 year-old, flirts with Tobbe
- Agnes Lindström Bolmgren as Ellinor Ekengreen, Victor's older sister
- Peter Schildt as Arthur Högström, Christoffer and Tobbe's father
- Gunilla Backman as Ann-Sofie Carlén, Mattias and Malena's aunt, owns a summer house on Sandhamn
- Cedomir Djordjevic as Goran Minosevitch, Balkan drug-dealer, Patrik's competitor, previous assault convictions

=== Season 6 additional cast ===
- Alexander Karim as Carsten Johnson/Lasse Jonsson, owns newly-built mansion, Celia's husband, property investment manager
- Cecilia Häll as Linda Öberg (née Kronberg), caterer, Gustav's sister
- Kaisa Hammarlund as Celia Johnson, Carsten's wife, London-resident, funds Carsten's investments
- Marvin Dackén as Oliver, Carsten's son
- Alba Karim as Sarah, Carsten's daughter
- Douglas Johansson as Pär-Anders Andersson, Anna's husband, Carsten's neighbour, disgruntled by encroachment and disruption by mansion builders
- Happy Jankell as Maria, Johnsons' au pair (Note: Happy's older sister, Felice Jankell portrays Ulrika in next story arc.)
- Erik Madsen as Dimitri, Russian property investor
- Magdalena in de Betou as Anna Andersson, Pär-Anders' wife
- Niclas Gustafsson as Mats, foreman, building Johnsons' mansion
- Robert Stanczak as Marek, Mats' worker
- Grim Lohman as Benjamin Wallin, Christian and Åsa's son, dislikes camp, gets bullied
- Natalie Minnevik as Maja, camp leader
- Charlie Petersson as Isak, camp leader
- Christopher Wagelin as Pontus Lindqvist, convicted paedophile, police notified of his release
- Romeo Altera as Samuel, camper, Sebbe's friend, bullies Ben
- Anton Forsdik as Sebbe, camper, Sammuel's fried, bullies Ben
- Felice Jankell as Ulrika, 25 year-old, wannabe writer, rents Brandska from Nora (Note: Felice's younger sister, Happy Jankell portrays Maria in previous story arc.)
- Wilma Lidén as Lova, camper, Simon's friend, befriends Ben
- Sara Vilén as Tindra, camper, Lova's and Simon's friend
- Robin Stegmar as Christian Wallin, Ben's father
- Tina Råborg as Åsa Wallin, Ben's mother
- Ulf Stenberg as Niklas Grönros, Christian's business partner
- Hanna Alström as Minna Björkholm, André's wife
- Tobias Aspelin as Dino Hovart, 40 year-old, works at André's car dealership
- Linus Wahlgren as André Björkholm, car dealership owner
- Peter Carlberg as Peter, Minna's father
- Pia Oscarsson as Sara, Minna's mother
- Anna Wallander as Anna-Marie Pettersson, Rosengården (women's refuge) manager, houses Minna and Aron
- Malin Persson as Ebba Sjöstrand, runs Sisters Sjöstrand restaurant, caterer, mostly waitress, Agnes' sister
- Tove Edfeldt as Agnes Sjöstrand, runs Sisters Sjöstrand restaurant, caterer, mostly accounts, Ebba's sister
- Jessica Liedberg as Ulrika Gunnarsson, André's high-price lawyer
- Erik Bolin as Emil Jonsson, boatyard owner, Andre's friend
- Dan Johansson (actor) as Herman Virtanen, Minna's victim's counsel
- Daniel Larsson (actor) as Jocke, Sisters Sjöstrand's chef
- Kajsa Ernst as Marika Sjöstrand, executive director of alcohol importers, mother of Agnes and Ebba, Stefan's wife
- Anders Berg (actor) as Filip Westlund, Sjöstrand business manager, Marika's lover
- Magnus Mark as Stefan Lundlin-Sjöstrand, Marika's second husband, Sjöstrand marketing manager
- Magnus Sundberg as Kim Ohlsson, Norway-based Wine Sweden CEO, ex-convict

=== Season 7 additional cast ===
- Jacob Ericksson as Dennis, prominent businessman, Bengt-Olof's golf buddy
- Noa Hultén as Johan, Dennis' elder son, Anna's love interest, she dumps him, ecstasy dealer
- Malte Gårdinger as Vincent Marklund, Johan's friend, ecstasy dealer
- Omeya Lundqvist-Simbizi as Ines Jacobsson, Anna's friend, works at cafe
- Harald Lönnbro as "Knarkbaron" ('drug baron'), supplies ecstasy to Johan
- Patrik Larsson (comedian) as "Festarrangör" ('party organiser'), runs Landline adult nightclub
- Kjell Wilhelmsen as Wilhelm "Wille" Bauer, Bauer Homes CEO, property speculator
- Cecilia Nilsson as Eva, mother of Sebastian and Jonna, owner of Strömma Cement
- Hampus Hallberg as Sebastian Carlmark, Eva's son, Strömma executive director, high-stakes gambler, heavy loser, Jonna's twin brother
- Agnes Hargne Wallander as Jonna Carlmark, Eva's daughter, Strömma treasurer and assistant director, Sebastian's twin sister
- Emil Almén as Louie, Julia's confidante and pimp
- Tuva Børgedotter Larsen as Kristina, former Sandhamn resident, rents Brandska, dating Anders
- Leonard Terfelt as Anders Lindén, Kristina's love interest
- Michelle Meadows as Sara Kallner, Anders girl-friend, found dead
- Hanna Malmberg as Petra Kallner-Carlsén, Sara's sister
- Rakel Wärmländer as Maria, former anaesthetic nurse, Anders' wife, mother of two children, Robert's lover (Note: Wärmländer is the mother of Anita Bringås Wärmländer, who portrays Young Vicky in "Vicky" episodes.)
- Krister Kern as Robert, Maria's lover, Anders' former employee
- André Sjöberg as "Solmannen" ('Sunny Man') pseudonym of man on dating app, met Sara at Nag's Head bar
- Agnes Fred as "Bartender" (Milla), at Nag's Head
- Nora Rios as Jackie, handball camp supervisor
  - Anita Bringås Wärmländer as Unga Vicky ('Young Vicky'), Carl-Johan's ten year-old daughter, looks after five year-old brother, Kalle (Note: Wärmländer is the daughter of Rakel Wärmländer, who portrays Maria in "The Promise" episodes)
- Leif Andrée as Carl-Johan Berger, prominent child psychologist and author, married three times
- Cecilia Frode as Lisa Berger, Carl-Johan's third wife, organised his 50th jubilee party
- Julia Marko-Nord as Mona, rents Brandska, mother of Micke, diagnosed with MS
- Valter Skarsgård as Mikael "Micke" Lindgren, rents Brandska, son of Mona
- Hanna Dorsin as Eva, Carl-Johan's adult daughter from his first wife
- Måns Nathanaelson as Mats, Carl-Johan's adult son from his first wife
- Roshi Hoss as Karin, Mats' wife
- Saskia Husberg as "Vickys Mamma" ('Vicky's mom'), Carl-Johan's second wife, mother of Vicky and Kalle, divorces Carl-Johan after Kalle drowns, raises Vicky
- Jakob Setterberg as Martin Koronen, concierge for Carl-Johan's jubilee, has affair with Lisa
- Carla Sehn as Carolina, 25 year-old waitress, works with Anna
- Björn A. Ling as Hans, Eva's husband

=== Season 8 additional cast ===
- Sven Ahlström as Leo Strandberg, rich businessman, Angelica's husband, Bengt-Olof's neighbour
- Lisbeth Johansson as Eva Andrén, chief prosecutor, Nora's boss
- Linda Källgren as Angelica Strandberg, Leo's wife, Bengt-Olof's lover
- Cilla Thorell as Kerstin Stenmark, Bengt-Olof's wife, Strandbergs' neighbour
- Ania Chorabik as Ursula Carlsson, Sylvester's lawyer
- Louise Ryme as Karin Hagel, Sylvester's sometime lover, guards his locker
- Björn Bengtsson as Theo Skoog, renowned golfer, Lili's husband, Albert's father
- Cecilia von der Esch as Inga-Lili "Lili" Skoog (née Anderson), Theo's missing wife, Albert's mother
- Maja Johanna Englander as Evelina, Albert's nanny, becomes Theo's love interest
- Mia Benson as Anki Anderson, Lili's mother
- Jennifer Amaka Pettersson as Therese, Theo's friend, owns Sandhamn summerhouse
- Mattias Fransson as Jörgen Humle, chief counsellor, manages young offenders home
- Vilda Schubert as Nathalie, youth, Olivia's love interest, runs away from young offenders home
- Anton Forsdik as Sebastian Broberg, youth, Olivia's friend, runs away from camp
- Meliz Karlge as Johanna Fagenberg, lawyer, trust fund manager
- Adja Krook as Olivia Thoren, youth, Pär's distant relative, trust fund activated on her 18th birthday, missing from camp

=== Season 9 additional cast ===
- Anna Sise as Karoline "Karro" Frost, new chief prosecutor, ex-UN Human Rights Council advisor, Nora's new boss, Alex' former lover, becomes his romantic interest
- Nassima Benchicou as Nadia Mansouri, Tunisian orphan, former Marseille thief, drug dealer, poses as human trafficking victim, attempts to escape Sébastien's gang
- Valentin Merlet as Michel Dupois/Sébastien Rossi, Corsican mafia drug lord, Gabriel's brother, Nadia's boss, poses as French policeman
- Pernilla Göst as "Tekniker" (English: "Technician"), Nacka forensic technician
- Lucia Haag as Unga Nora Johansson (English: "Young" Nora), 18-year-old, student supervisor, Henrik's love interest, Esther's friend, Gisela's rival
- Henrik Norlén as Arne Isaksson, Iris' ex-husband, Esther's father, priest, ran 1992 confirmation camp
- Charlotta Jonsson as Iris Seppa (formerly Isaksson), Estonian emigré, Arne's ex-wife, Esther's mother, ran 1992 confirmation camp, became spiritual, domestic violence counsellor
- Michaela Thorsén as Esther Seppa (née Isaksson), lives in Tallinn convent
  - Elsa Öhrn as Unga Esther Isaksson (English: "Young" Esther), 18-year-old daughter of Iris and Arne, student supervisor, Josef's love interest, disappeared presumed drowned
- Per Lasson (actor) as Josef Sjöhof, alcoholic, handyman, living on boat, minor criminal
  - Marcus Vögeli as Unga Josef Sjöhof (English: "Young" Josef), 20-year-old youth pastor, Esther's love interest
- Fabian Penje as Unga Henrik Linde (English: "Young" Henrik), 18-year-old student supervisor, Nora's and Gisela's love interest
- Ylvali Rurling as Unga Gisela Silferstolpe (English: "Young" Gisela), 14-year-old confirmation camper, Henrik's love interest, Nora's rival
- Margareta Stone as Präst Ingrid (English: "Priest" Ingrid), runs 2022 confirmation camp on Knappholmen
- Love Fogelqvist as Petter Jansberg, 15-year-old confirmation camper, presumed drowned, skeleton found 30 years later
- Martin Nordin as Johan Hedkvist, 15-year-old confirmation camper, presumed drowned, skeleton found 30 years later
- Mattias Malmros as Max Frösmyr: younger brother of Björn, worked at Sören's garden centre, plans vengeance for Björn's death in police custody

== Episode guide ==
=== Season 1 ===
No. overall	No. in season	Title	Directed by	Written by	Based on	Original release date
1	1	"Still Waters Part 1"	Marcus Olsson	Sara Heldt, Thomas Borgström	I de lugnaste vatten	20 December 2010
Nora and children visit a beach, Nora swims into a net-covered corpse. Margit sends Thomas' team to Sandhamn: they retrieve the corpse. The net tag has an identifying mark. Nora tells Henrik about finding the corpse. Signe asks Nora about the case. Carina updates Thomas: corpse is Krister, missing since March. At Krister's flat, Thomas tells Kicki that Krister died. That night Thomas takes sleeping pills. Lidwall and Blom stakeout Kicki's flat. Carina replaces them but Thomas slept-in: she repeatedly phones. Carina follows Kicki aboard Sandhamn ferry. Kicki enters a hostel: Carina has a toilet break. Thomas wakes: Carina's lost Kicki. Nora greets Harald and Monica at the ferry; sees Thomas disembark. Carina describes Kicki's outfit: Thomas searches. Harald recognises Jonny's identifying mark: Nora tells Thomas. At a bar, Jonny shows Kicki his sketch. Henrik does not want Nora involved in the case. Hours pass: no Kicki. Thomas tells Margit: Kicki's at a hostel. Kicki and Jonny are dancing: Ellen is outside and hears Kicki scream. Ellen knocks but Jonny tells her its just a TV show. Next morning, Thomas is harbourside with Carina and gets a call: Kicki's dead. Her purse has Jonny's drawing and identifying mark.
2	2	"Still Waters Part 2"	Marcus Olsson	Sara Heldt, Thomas Borgström	I de lugnaste vatten	21 December 2010
Carina monitors Kicki's corpse, Thomas returns to Jonny's: alerted by Ellen, Jonny drives his speedboat away. Margit arrives but Thomas has not returned. Ellen says Kicki was with Jonny last night. Thomas tells Margit yesterday he slept-in and consequently lost Kicki. Nora and Anna see Jonny travel past. Margit's not pleased by Thomas' performance and sends him home. Signe asks Nora about the second corpse. Henrik micro-manages Nora: she has an appointment. On the ferry Nora sees Thomas returning to Nacka. Thomas confirms Jonny's a suspect: Nora saw Jonny leaving. They disembark at Harö. Nora directs Thomas to Jonny’s fishing lodge. Thomas finds no trace of Jonny. Jonny holds Nora at gunpoint as Thomas stalks nearer. Jonny explains Kicki fell, she was bleeding but left. Henrik sees Thomas, Nora and Jonny arrive. Thomas believes Jonny is innocent. Margit is not convinced. Henrik is jealous of Nora's time with Thomas. Simon and Harald see Henrik slap Nora. At Krister's flat Carina finds a photo of young Krister next to a tall man. When Cecilia was dying she told Krister it showed his real father. Margit believes Jonny will confess. Autopsy shows Kicki was poisoned by anti-coagulant hours before meeting Jonny.
3	3	"Still Waters Part 3"	Marcus Olsson	Sara Heldt, Thomas Borgström	I de lugnaste vatten	22 December 2010
Harald and Monica take their grandchildren to the beach. Henrik tries to apologize for slapping Nora but believes Thomas is pursuing her. Nora becomes upset, locks herself in a room. Grandparents report that Simon and Anna are missing. With Kajsa's help Nora finds them in a small cave. Thomas and Carina ask Signe to identify the tall man: she does not. Anna informs Nora of the cave's skeleton. Nora tells Anna's story to Signe: who dismisses it. Nora and Thomas go to the cave and see the skeleton. Thomas and Nora kiss but she runs off. Harald and Monica celebrate their 40th anniversary. Skeleton's identity: Allan Black, Signe's husband. Nora and Signe go to Grönskär. Thomas, Carina and Henrik look for Nora and Signe. Signe owns a fishing zone surrounding Grönskär. Nora asks Signe why not inform police of Jonny's net tag. Signe tells Nora about meeting Krister and Cecilia in June 1961. Allan was Krister's father. Nora realizes Signe killed Allan, Krister and Kicki. Signe leaves Nora in a locked lighthouse. Signe ties a rope and anchor around her neck. The police find Signe's boat with Nora's shoes. At nightfall, Thomas sees the lighthouse's fire and rescues Nora.

=== Season 2 ===
No. overall	No. in season	Title	Directed by	Written by	Based on	Original release date
4	1	"Closed Circles Part 1"	Niklas Ohlson, Mattias Ohlsson	Hans Rosenfeldt, Camilla Ahlgren	I den innersta kretsen	17 December 2012
Henrik steers Oscar's racing yacht to victory. Nora hosts numerous guests watching the finish. Oscar is shot dead. Claire scrounges through Thomas' things. Thomas and Mia attend Oscar's corpse. Henrik recalls the second shot went into Oscar's chest. Margit gives Thomas and Mia a small venue for work. KSSS board meet, Hans stands down, Ingmar's new chairman. Mia and Thomas interview Sylvia: Oscar had mistresses. Thomas lets Mia stay in his spare room. Nora wants a divorce from Henrik: she denies it's because of Thomas. Police get Oscar's client list from Eva. Oscar wanted a greater share of profits, which would reduce Ingrid's portion. Oscar received threatening emails. Eva says Diana was his mistress. Diana claims Oscar wanted a divorce. Isabelle wants to celebrate Ingmar's chairmanship. Margit: hunting rifle with silencer was used. Hans agrees that Martin claim Oscar stole KSSS' money. Martin gets message to meet "Indi". Britta asks Nora and Henrik about her missing camera. She asks if Brandska is for sale; Nora says not. Nora tells Thomas she's getting a divorce. When Nora returns home, Henrik tries to romance her with a meal and flowers. Police determine fatal shot came from Nora's or Brandska.
5	2	"Closed Circles Part 2"	Niklas Ohlson, Mattias Ohlsson	Hans Rosenfeldt, Camilla Ahlgren	I den innersta kretsen	18 December 2012
Henrik provides Monica's invitation list. Nora checks people not on terrace. Police survey Brandska: no break-in; Nora sees a cloth bag. Eva supplies Oscar's client list. Ingrid denies killing Oscar but has no alibi. Monica tells Nora: Henrik will never sign; divorce is Nora's fault. Henrik defends Monica. Thomas interviews Martin: Oscar took 250,000; Hans informed. Sylvia tells Mia: Oscar and Tom disliked each other. Thomas asks Nora to research Oscar's clients. KSSS board: each provides location during shooting. Police query Tom: he was in Nacka with people. Nora drops children at Nacka home. Nora tells Henrik she saw Marie's suggestive message. Nora spontaneously visits Thomas, but he's dining with Mia. Nora checks Brandska, someone shoves door into her and runs off. Margit: Isabelle wants Thomas to apologise for suspicions. Ingmar lost his mobile. Nora tells Thomas: Oscar's bankruptcy properties, including Arvid's, were re-sold for high profits. Nora's reviewing payments into Oscar's accounts. Arvid says he's not angry about low settlement. Henrik returns children, claims Marie's a confidante: he's not believed. Margit: threatening emails are from Tom. After a message from "Indi", Martin arrives at a cabin where he is shot dead.
6	3	"Closed Circles Part 3"	Niklas Ohlson, Mattias Ohlsson	Hans Rosenfeldt, Camilla Ahlgren	I den innersta kretsen	19 December 2012
Police: Martin was meeting "Indi". Hans: Martin lent Oscar money, not stolen. Arvid and Ingrid are a couple: she does not want their relationship exposed. Britta finds her camera. Henrik concedes to Harald: divorce's his fault. Harald tells him to sign papers. Britta asks Nora to download photos from her camera. Henrik signs divorce papers. Thomas interviews Ingrid: admits to dating Arvid but she's not "Indi". Diane: Tom knows Filip is Oscar’s son. Mia questions Tom: agrees he threatened Oscar. Ingmar says he's "Indi" and loved Martin for years; claims neither Isabelle nor Oscar knew. Last message sent from Ingmar's phone was after he lost it. From Britta's photos: Nora sees cloth bag in her foyer. Nora returns to Brandska, imagines lining up a shot near a window and smells pillow nearby. Syliva tells Isabelle: Nora's researching Oscar's finances. Nora to Isabelle: checking Oscar's accounts. Sylvia tells Thomas: Isabelle went to Nora's. Nora refuses Isabelle's bribe. Isabelle uses a knife to threaten Nora. Police arrive: Isabelle surrenders. Oscar knew Ingmar was gay; blackmailed Isabelle for money and sex. She killed Oscar and Martin. Nora puts Brandska up for rent. Nora visits Thomas and meets Claire.

=== Season 3 ===
No. overall	No. in season	Title	Directed by	Written by	Based on	Original release date
7	1	"Guiltless Part 1"	Niklas Ohlson, Mattias Ohlsson	Camilla Ahlgren, Hans Rosenfeldt	I grunden utan skuld	2 December 2013
Simon learns sailing from Magnus. Simon, Anna and friends play in forest. They find severed arm and tell Bengt. Margit: check Lina's disappearance, last November. Marianne recognises Lina's jewellery. Nora divorced from Henrik. Previous October, boat accident when Sebbe died had Lina, Jakob and Sara aboard. Bengt and Ingrid questioned when Lina vanished. Sara describes accident; Sebbe drove Göran's boat. Lina disappeared after Sebbe's funeral. Hanna: Jakob was Lina's boyfriend, now Sara's boyfriend. Jakob hit Lina; they separated before disappearance. Göran packs his boat. Mia finds Jakob and Sara talking. Mia questions Jakob: dated Sara since Easter; Lina broke up with him but he never hit her. Ulrika barges in, orders Jakob to leave. Bengt's and Marianne's families feuded. Mia stays with Thomas during investigation. Claire borrows paint. Thomas has meal with Pernilla. Nora interrupts Jakob yelling at Sara. Magnus invites Nora out but she declines. Shadowy figure digs in forest. Thomas informs Marianne: sniffer dogs arrive today. Sara to police: Lina said Göran groped her. Thomas phones Göran: no reply. Nora to Thomas: Jakob and Sara argued. Lina's memorial held; Marianne thanks Bengt for attending. Sara accuses Göran of groping Lina. Sara sees someone in forest and is frightened.
8	2	"Guiltless Part 2"	Niklas Ohlson, Mattias Ohlsson	Camilla Ahlgren, Hans Rosenfeldt	I grunden utan skuld	9 December 2013
Hanna to police: Sara missing since nine last night; bike's gone. Police interview Jakob: no idea where Sara is; saw her at memorial, went for walk and home at 11. Ulrika got home later. In Sara's room Thomas finds "J" necklace. Police collect Sara's laptop. Cadaver dogs find human remains recently removed. Monica: Henrik and Marie live together. Göran's boat gone: he's not answering phone. Police to Marianne: Sara's missing, no news on Lina. Jakob finds Sara's bike. Mia asks Nora about significant events when Lina disappeared. Thomas updates Margit: Göran had motive; Jakob possibly involved. Sara's laptop: contacted Måns. Nora reads local newspapers: fire destroyed boatshed. Mia arrests Måns with bag of pills. Måns: never met Sara. At boatshed, Mia finds another "J" necklace: matches Sara's. Forensics found blood near boatshed. Nora introduces Magnus to Thomas. Göran's boat returned. As Mia enters, she's knocked out. Pernilla visits Thomas on Harö. Claire borrows petrol. Pernilla approves of Thomas' renovations. Nora gets dressed up and finds Magnus. Mia wakes on Göran's boat; phones Thomas. Police watch Göran's boat. Nora and Magnus sleep together. Someone walks into a tower where Sara's bound and gagged: gives her a drink of water then leaves.
9	3	"Guiltless Part 3"	Niklas Ohlson, Mattias Ohlsson	Camilla Ahlgren, Hans Rosenfeldt	I grunden utan skuld	16 December 2013
Nora sneaks off Magnus' boat: seen by Harald. Göran to police: left boat, went to bar, spent night with Lotta. Bartender: Göran there last night. Pernilla feels easy with Thomas. Monica and Harald return children; Harald said nothing. Bagged, severed leg discovered near shore. Tied with blue rope. Police search Göran’s boat: same blue rope, blood-stained hoodie and long hairs. Göran arrested for kidnap and murder. Jakob: egged Sebbe drive faster, hit buoy, boat exploded. Bengt to Nora: Ingrid would read Carolina’s diaries. Bengt gives Simon and Anna boat ride. Ingrid to Nora: go to Lökholmen tower, now. Nora finds Sara: it was Bengt. Nora phones police: Sara’s okay but Bengt has children. Bengt unloads bags on another island. Ingrid’s taken sleeping pills. Bengt throws body parts into water. Nora and Thomas see Bengt’s boat; find children. Bengt runs from Thomas. Thomas slips into water. Nora hears calling, puts children aside. Bengt holds Thomas above water. Nora revives Thomas by CPR. Magnus leaves Sandhamn. Thomas hospitalised with concussion. Bengt to Margit and Mia: saw Lina at Sebbe’s grave, crying for encouraging Sebbe to drive faster. Bengt raged, threw Lina down: she died instantly. Nora meets Pernilla and Thomas at hospital.

=== Season 4 ===
No. overall	No. in season	Title	Directed by	Written by	Based on	Original release date
10	1	"Tonight You're Dead Part 1"	Niklas Ohlson, Mattias Ohlsson	Camilla Ahlgren, Hans Rosenfeldt	I natt är du död	27 November 2014
Nora greets Jonas and Vera; Sven transports luggage. Maria finds Marcus hanged. Pernilla joins Thomas on Harö. Police find unsigned suicide note, no computer, no mobile. Boot marks outside unlatched window. Maria to Thomas: Marcus was happy; booked trip with David. Thomas dismisses suicide; treat as murder. Margit agrees. Vera: parents having marriage problems. Marcus' e-diary: met former rangers, went to Storken Pharmacy. Bo to police: recognizes Marcus, asked about ranger experiences but memory's hazy. Lena and police find Jan-Erik drowned. Susanna to Mia: Marcus researched group dynamics. Maria to Thomas: do not know Marcus' girlfriends. Martin sees Susanna upset: student died. Margit: contact Elsa for rangers' details. Nora fixes blocked toilet for Jonas. Claire interrupts Pernilla and Thomas kissing. Jonas and Nora chat. Annika to Mia: do not recognize Marcus. Jan-Erik held down, green soap in lungs. David: Susanna loved Marcus. Susanna to police: Martin in Sandhamn when Marcus died. Jenny confirms Martin's alibi. Anders phones Thomas: more rangers Leif, Stefan and Sven. Bo leaves flat. Pernilla asks if Thomas would marry again: only if she wants to. Henrik wants Marie to attend Anna's birthday party, Nora's says okay: Thomas might go. Sven gets home: sees Bo.
11	2	"Tonight You're Dead Part 2"	Niklas Ohlson, Mattias Ohlsson	Camilla Ahlgren, Hans Rosenfeldt	I natt är du död	4 December 2014
Elsa gives police: 1985 unit's graduation photo. Robert to police: did not see Marcus, Leif was brutal. Margit: unknown DNA on Marcus' rope. Leif: no contact from Marcus, Robert was ruthless: trained by wading through shit. Jonas finds Sven drowned in tub. Olle smokes fish, Thomas shows him unit photo: recognizes Bo and saw him yesterday. Anna's birthday party starts. Henrik meets Jonas. Police return to Bo's: find photos of squad. Henrik suspicious of Jonas. Nora says goodbye to children: they go back with Henrik. Thomas and Pernilla have BBQ and drink wine, Claire joins. Olle takes Nora to Korsö, where rangers trained, some could not cope. Robert picked a trainee to become his favorite victim: no-one said anything. Nora sees green liquid soap. Dorms in tunnels, they had little sleep. Olle remembers most trainees accepted situation to prove their courage and endurance. Bo is at shoreline drinking, a car pulls up behind him. Annika to Mia: no-one recognizes Marcus. Sven also deliberately drowned and had liquid soap in lungs. Bo's found dead, Mia saves Bo's cat. Jonas shares a drink with Nora: Malin wants a divorce. Thomas and Pernilla go to opera. Birgitta goes to yoga, Robert's knocked out.
12	3	"Tonight You're Dead Part 3"	Niklas Ohlson, Mattias Ohlsson	Camilla Ahlgren, Hans Rosenfeldt	I natt är du död	11 December 2014
Nora comforts Vera: parents divorcing. Bo murdered by head blow, soap in lungs. Lena to police: Jan-Erik's diaries have 1984 and 1985 missing. Brigitta: Robert's gone, Marcus did talk to Robert. Robert hid Marcus computer and mobile. Henrik checking on Nora. Olle to Nora: unit had eight members not seven. Elsa: Pär suicide by hanging, on Korsö. Thomas offers police protection for Anders. Pär bullied by Robert, Bo, Jan-Erik and Sven. Annika is Storken pharmacist. Nora reads "three murdered with soap", remembers soap at Korsö. Police obtain Annika's arrest warrant: not working nor home. Jan-Erik's diaries at Annika's. Thomas sees Korsö circled on map. Annika repeatedly dunks Robert in tub. Olle and Nora arrive at Korsö, Annika runs off. Olle lifts Robert out of tub. Nora does CPR: Robert revives. Thomas and Mia arrive. Nora follows Annika near cliff edge. Annika raving about Pär's murder. Annika walks backwards off cliff. Robert explains why Pär was punished: he embarrassed Robert in front of dignitaries. Shoved Pär's head repeatedly into soapy water until he drowned. Robert and others made it look like suicide. Mia given Bo's cat. Jonas treats Nora to meal: they kiss. Vera sees them. Thomas on vacation, Pernilla's pregnant.

=== Season 5 ===
No. overall	No. in season	Title	Directed by	Written by	Based on	Original release date
13	1	"In the Heat of the Moment Part 1"	Niklas Ohlson, Mattias Ohlsson	Camilla Ahlgren, Hans Rosenfeldt	I stundens hetta	18 November 2015
Annual Midsummer party begins. Christoffer's boat passengers: Tobbe, Ebba, Felicia and Victor. Vera asks to party. Jonas: keep phone on. Vera sits near Mattias. Patrik sells Victor ecstasy; Patrik's underpaid. Felicia takes ecstasy. Nora and Jonas sleep. Vera and Mattias drink wine. Patrik and Victor fight; separated by Harry and Anna. Nora: Vera took wine, which Vera denies; Jonas accepts her denial. Tobbe and Victor snort cocaine. Police pick up Felicia. Jonas to Nora: Vera's not back, nor answering. Nora informs Thomas. Ebba to Anna: where's Felicia and Victor? Felicia found. Monica asks Nora: collect Felicia and Ebba? Both recover at Nora's. Tobbe to Henry: Ebba cleared off, not seen Victor. Thomas and Mia attend Victor's corpse. Staffan: skull bashed, died elsewhere, hours earlier, vomit-covered cloth and phone. Phone's registered to Johan. Harry: Högströms at marina. Johan identifies Victor. Christoffer and Tobbe: Tessan flirted with Tobbe, Ebba jealous and stormed off. Victor left at nine. Högströms went to another party, without Victor. Christoffer to Thomas: Patrik argued with Victor. Harry recognizes Patrik's photo. Ebba to Thomas: accompanied Felicia to party, Victor gets violent after drinking. After Tobbe's argument, Ebba went to another party. Thomas to Jonas: no sign of Vera.
14	2	"In the Heat of the Moment Part 2"	Niklas Ohlson, Mattias Ohlsson	Camilla Ahlgren, Hans Rosenfeldt	I stundens hetta	25 November 2015
Thomas and Mia arrest Patrik: Victor took phone without payment; they argued. Felicia: kissed Victor; vomited, then slept. Madeleine blames Johan: let Victor party. Nora finds Vera. Vera: got drunk, lost phone, fell asleep. Jonas: grounded till Christmas. Christoffer to police: Tobbe and Victor friends, sometimes argued; Tobbe, Tessan and friends partied until 3; hooked up with Sara at 11, not sure where Tobbe was. Christoffer to Arthur: Victor's dead. Arthur: return immediately. Vera: Nora's tattle-tale. Margit: Victor killed by rounded object; high blood alcohol; traces: ecstasy and cocaine. Johan: Victor smart and ambitious, never drugs. Johan accuses Madeleine: ignored Victor's drug-taking. Pernilla relocates to Nacka: Thomas overworks. Jonas asks Nora: check Vera despite teenager attitude. Arthur to Mia: Tobias unavailable until 12 tomorrow. Ann-Sofie to Thomas: away for Midsummer, too crazy. Someone's been in Brandska, left vomit smell. Armchair cloth: same one near corpse. At Patrik's: door unlocked, find marijuana plants, Patrik shot dead. Find ecstasy upstairs; no cocaine. Goran: never saw Victor nor Patrik. Vera frosty toward Nora. Margit: Tessan said Tobbe left at 10, not seen again. Vera sees Nora kiss Thomas goodbye. Arthur asks Tobbe: tell everything, now. Felicia remembers: Tobbe on rocks where Victor died.
15	3	"In the Heat of the Moment Part 3"	Niklas Ohlson, Mattias Ohlsson	Camilla Ahlgren, Hans Rosenfeldt	I stundens hetta	2 December 2015
Margit: Rovan confessed to Patrik's murder. Nora to Vera: Jonas will always choose you. Thomas to Margit: Felicity saw Tobbe following Victor. Nora to Vera: no romance with Thomas. Ellinor: last Christmas Victor took drugs at Tobbe’s. Tobbe to police: left Christoffer's party looked for Ebba, no Felicia nor Victor, did take drugs, fell asleep on shoreline. Newspaper report: police have suspect. Johan sees police searching Högström home. Johan phones Arthur: Tobbe’s the suspect. Vera to Nora: Mattias took her to aunt's house. Harry's torn vest matches fragment. Harry: found Felicia, saw Victor, who became violent. Harry felled Victor onto rock, left bleeding but alive. Arthur coerces Tobbe: attend Victor's memorial. Johan takes gun. At memorial Tobbe apologizes to Ebba. Nora takes Vera to Thomas: Mattias got amorous, taking Vera’s clothes off, she made herself vomit on him, then ran off. Mattias arrested. Johan gives Victor’s eulogy. Mattias: Vera wanted sex but got sick, went outside for fresh air. He cleaned up house, threw away vomit-covered cloth, saw Victor. Victor tried strangling Mattias. At memorial Johan shoots Tobbe for killing Victor. Mattias hit Victor with a rock to escape. Mattias hid corpse. Johan arrested for attempted murder. Nora attends Elin's Christening.

=== Season 6 ===
No. overall	No. in season	Title	Directed by	Written by	Based on	Original release date
16	1	"The Price of Power Part 1"	Mattias Ohlsson	Camilla Ahlgren, Martin Asphaug	I maktens skugga	12 April 2018
Anton ignites newspapers on rooftop. Oliver and Sarah sneak inside; Maria removes them. Linda finds dead cormorants, "Piss Off!" note. Carsten: keep secret. At bakery, Anderssons complain about Johnsons’ mansion, Celia meets Nora. Vera minds stepsiblings; Nora and Jonas go to party. Marek: Carsten, pay us. Mats: I will fix it. Carsten: money on way. Dimitri phones Carsten: want money, today. Johnsons greet guests. Carsten snorts cocaine. Olle and Anderssons: council bribed? Julia follows Carsten to beach. Dimitri asks for Carsten. Nora and Jonas see burning sauna, phone fire department. Someone trapped inside. Thomas and Mia attend corpse; find lighter, broken glass. Mia: unidentified body inside. Celia: Carsten left at 10, Dimitri wanted Carsten, provides attendee list. Maria to Mia: children in bed early, Carsten drunk. Linda: kitchen all night, took boat home, mentions note. Nora: no fights, Carsten with Julia, Pär-Anders against mansion. Pär-Anders: wrote nasty comments, home at 12. Margit: male corpse, blow to head, died of smoke inhalation. Anton lights bonfire. Mia: videoing crowd, Anton skulks away. Jonas and Vera: Mallorca holiday. Nora identifies Anton. Olle: Anton does not burn buildings, nor use lighter or petrol. Anton: someone drove small white boat. Carsten arrives in similar boat.
17	2	"The Price of Power Part 2"	Mattias Ohlsson	Camilla Ahlgren, Martin Asphaug	I maktens skugga	12 April 2018
Carsten: cannot remember, woke up alone, does not know Dimitri. Carsten names Julia to police; lies to Celia. Carsten greets children, tries to charm Maria. Nora: checking Carsten's financial history. Pernilla promoted, works more. Carsten kisses Maria; she walks off. Celia phones Carsten's number, Oliver answers. Carsten slaps Oliver, yells at Maria. Julia: Carsten left her waiting, later returned, stayed together next day. Carsten's computer photos: him at Julia's. Carsten: just cuffed Oliver. Fingerprints on lighter from Gustav: overdosed in 2007. Nora: Carsten's dodgy deals; company bankrupted, bailout from in-laws, now Russian deals. Carsten phones Shaun: needs money, swears publicly. Maria's afraid, leaves job. Celia wants to return to London. Carsten begs her to stay, no idea how to pay debts. Carsten: dragged Dimitri unconscious into sauna, left him. Carsten snorts cocaine, drinks and takes his gun. Nora goes to Johnsons. Celia and children leaving. Carsten waves gun, apologizes to Oliver, threatens Celia. Sees two men, puts gun in pocket, goes outside. Nora phones police for help. After arguing, men leave. Carten shoots himself dead. Linda: Gustav idolized Carsten, lost money in schemes. Gustav turned to drugs until he died. Linda admits to burning sauna. Jonas and Vera return.
18	3	"In the Name of the Truth Part 1"	Mattias Ohlsson	Daniel Alfredson, Birgitta Bongenhielm	I sanningens namn	19 April 2018
Pontus approaches Simon. Ben dislikes Knarrholmen camp; Christian insists. Nora drives Simon to camp; he photographs campers. Isak collects all mobiles. Christian to Asa: landline for emergencies. Niklas wants cash, now; Christian: have to sell first. Thomas takes nightshift. Samuel and Sebbe bullying Ben. Ben wants mobile, Maja dismisses it as homesickness. Bullies: fart jokes, name-calling, teasing. Ulrika rents Brandska. Nora, Jonas and Ulrika have dinner. Ben sees campers dancing, walks away, Pontus follows. Ulrika dumped by married man, should she tell wife? Nora dissuades her. Pernilla moves back to Nacka. Vera photographs Nora and Thomas hugging, sends to Jonas. After showing Nora, Jonas flies to Thailand. Ben, Lova and Tindra enjoy sailing. Maja’s scavenger hunt: answers around island. Ben teamed with Samuel and Sebbe. Simon sees Pontus at jetty. Bullies deliberately mislead Ben, dump him in cold water, and abandon him. Pontus finds Ben, gives him towel. Ben sees Simon's trio, joins them. Bullies steal Ben's clothes. Vera regrets photo. Maja collects answers. Ben in office, tries landline, Christian does not answer: let Ben solve own issues. Pontus watches Ben. Isak takes Ben back to hut. Pontus enters boys hut, takes Ben's top. Thomas catches petrol siphoning criminals.
19	4	"In the Name of the Truth Part 2"	Mattias Ohlsson	Daniel Alfredson, Birgitta Bongenhielm	I sanningens namn	19 April 2018
Ben's missing, Tova finds hanged dummy, wearing Ben's clothes. Thomas and Mia sent to Knarrholmen. Tova and Simon detail bullying. Simon saw Pontus; shows boat’s mooring, sends Thomas recent Ben photo. Samuel and Sebbe admit bullying. Christian blames Maja. Simon confirms Pontus' photo. Police watch Pontus' home. Wallins to Thomas: release Ben's photo and their names. Pontus not home for weeks. Jonas and Nora videoconference. Pontus fingerprints on Ben's bed and window. Mia: Pontus' at Dalarö. Thomas arrests Pontus, finds Ben's top. Ulrika to Nora: writing's going well. Christian to Åsa: police arrested Pontus, found Ben’s top. Pontus: found top in woods. Thomas grapples Pontus; Mia drags Thomas off; sent home. Åsa blames Christian for Ben's disappearance. Another boat's camera: Pontus leaves, Ben arrives and leaves on another boat. Niklas to Christian: where's my money? Nora to Thomas: talk to Pernilla. After Ulrika leaves home, Thomas and Nora see lights. Christian to Niklas: where's Ben, they fight. Nora and Thomas find Ben, Ulrika returns. Ulrika had affair with Christian. Ulrika: rescued Ben from bullies. Thomas phones Christian: Ben's alright. Niklas was knocked out. Ulrika arrested for kidnapping. Christian charged with assault. Claire returns borrow items. Jonas asks Nora to marry.
20	5	"In Bad Company Part 1"	Mattias Ohlsson	Camilla Ahlgren, Martin Asphaug	I fel sällskap	26 April 2018
André repeatedly hits Minna. Dino sees them. Nora to Ulrika: client charged in two weeks. Parents visit Minna in hospital. Nora's hens party at restaurant. Thomas: Elin is with Pernilla. Nora's videoconference with Jonas, in Thailand. Dino to Mia: phone stolen, did not make emergency call. André phones Minna: forgive him, never happen again. Minna: it's over. Henrik visits Nora, why was he not invited to wedding? Parents do not answer André, Peter gets rifle. André bangs door, throws rock through window. Sara collapses. Minna carries Aron out of ward. André searches hospital, finds Aron's toy. Mia packs pram in car, drives off as André exits hospital. Mia takes Minna to Rosengården and introduces Anna-Marie. André meets Emil, admires boat. André invites Dino: test run boat. Nora and Thomas share meal. André drives fast, then asks Dino why he called police. André fights Dino, hits him on head with spike. Nora describes dodgy work by car retailer. Claire sets up Thomas on dating app. Margit: Thomas attend unidentified corpse on abandoned boat. Ulrika to André: Nora is prosecutor. André: informant not Minna. Margit: boat was at Emil's docks. Mia identifies corpse as Dino. André: home with Emil playing cards.
21	6	"In Bad Company Part 2"	Mattias Ohlsson	Camilla Ahlgren, Martin Asphaug	I fel sällskap	26 April 2018
Emil: played cards with André, stayed overnight. Jonas arrives home. Minna to Herman: André more brutal after Aron born. Jonas and Nora taste menu for reception. Jonas jealous of Thomas. André lies to Emil: Dino gambled, had debts. Thomas to Nora: Minna's injuries. Ulrika to André: Minna's lawyer is Herman. André threatens Herman at gunpoint, leaves Herman tied up. André: questions Anna-Marie, breaks fingers. Herman unties himself. Thomas and Nora arrive at Rosengården. Minna hides from André. André hears Aron. Thomas: André's here; finds Anna-Marie. André threatens Minna, notices Thomas and escapes. Nora: put Minna at Brandska. Thomas: stays there, too. Minna to Nora: photos of André's home office. Nora cancels wedding: Jonas unfaithful. Peter phones Minna: Sara died. Ulrika: Nora has enough evidence for prosecution, turn yourself in, find new lawyer. Anna-Marie confirms André attacked. Emil lies to Mia: André not here. André uses Emil's phone: finds Nora’s address. Nora asks Jonas to leave. Nora to Thomas: broke-up with Jonas. André takes Nora hostage, forces her to reveal Minna. André disarms Thomas, demands Minna bring Aron. André waves gun at Nora and Thomas but shot dead by Peter. Peter: protecting Minna, charged with manslaughter. Simon and Anna return.
22	7	"In Sickness and in Health Part 1"	Mattias Ohlsson	Katarina Ewers	I nöd och lust	3 May 2018
Police stakeout alcohol smugglers, Thomas goes for coffee. Mia phones Thomas when van arrives. Thomas busy on Pernilla's call. Mia, seeing man unloading boxes, pulls her gun out. Kim strikes Mia from behind with pole. Thomas finds Mia unconscious and bleeding. Jonas to Nora: will pick up last of his clothes. Ebba and Agnes ask Nora to sample tomorrow's menu. Marika and Stefan organise her 60th birthday. Claire agrees to look after Bertil. Thomas finds vodka, imported by Sjöstrand's. Filip to Kim: deliver alcohol to Agnes. Filip to Thomas: mainly sell wine, added vodka, also sells to Wine Sweden. Thomas to Margit: Kim's probably façade. Thomas asks Nora: investigate Sjöstrands. 60th party starts. Nora and Henrik dance: Marie’s left Henrik. Marika promotes new wine. Stefan and Jocke smoke. Filip and Marika flirt. Agnes' kidnapped. Nora: Henrik stay at Brandska. Ebba tells parents: Agnes gone, restaurant unlocked. Kidnapper: have Agnes, sends photo. Agnes groggy, tied up in rusty boat. Ebba wants to call police; Marika and Stefan object. Kidnapper: no police, we want money. Margit: Mia's conscious. Thomas to Mia: Bertil's with Claire. Mia remembers little. Jonas collects suitcases, sees Henrik, they discuss Nora. Agnes asks for water, kidnapper gives drink.
23	8	"In Sickness and in Health Part 2"	Mattias Ohlsson	Katarina Ewers	I nöd och lust	3 May 2018
Kim’s alibi: at bar. Kidnapper wants 5 million. Marika knows about illegal alcohol. Thomas brings Mia’s laptop. Henrik and Nora become passionate but interrupted by Thomas. Nora: Sjöstrand companies smuggling and tax evasion. Mia starts identikit. Marika: Filip dealt with Wine Sweden and Kim. Kidnapper feeds Agnes. Marika gets instructions. Henrik returns Brandska keys. Mia's identikit matches Filip. Fillip: money into Marika’s suitcase. Ebba tells Nora: Agnes kidnapped. Nora phones Thomas, leaves message. Thomas follows Filip into warehouse, attacked by Kim. Thomas subdues Kim. Filip stopped by police. Thomas to Filip: Mia's identikit of attacker. Filip: wants lawyer. Margit: is Marika involved? Thomas: bring Marika in. Nora to Thomas: Agnes kidnapped. Stefan sends Marika and Ebba off. Marika leaves suitcase. Hooded figure approaches, its Agnes. Nora encounters Stefan; he’s leaving. Marika’s suitcase has books. Marika phones Stefan: know what he's done. Nora eludes Stefan, takes suitcase to house, calls Thomas, and knocks out Stefan. Jocke arrives sees Nora, pulls gun and takes suitcase. Thomas enters, shot in arm, Jocke runs off. Police warn Jocke, he raises gun, gets shot. Stefan and Jocke plotted to steal money from Marika. Marika and Filip arrested. Agnes and Ebba released. Mia leaves police force.

=== Season 7 ===
No. overall	No. in season	Title	Directed by	Written by	Based on	Original release date
24	1	"Blue Lies Part 1"	Mattias Ohlsson	Johan Widerberg, Mattias Ohlsson	Blå lögner	3 August 2020
Youths dancing to electronica, man collapses. Bengt: man died from blue pills (ecstasy), must find dealers. Vincent enters building; Johan's re-packing pills. Nora disallows Anna from music festival. Vincent shows Alex pills, sirens sound. Vincent runs, discards pills before being caught. Bengt asks about pills. Vincent wants lawyer, taken away. Alex: undercover to find dealers. Bengt: unimpressed, follow procedure. Alex snaps at Miriam for arresting him. Bengt: work together. At Tor’s school, Dennis: Tor attacked Oscar. Tor: no apology, "called mum a whore". Dennis insults Alex; Alex threatens Dennis. Anna and Ines inside Flatlines. Berit supervises Tor. Ines gives Anna ecstasy. Anna talks to Johan; spits out pills. Alex: Vincent's arrest warrant? Nora: insufficient evidence. Alex: "bitch"; Nora kisses Alex. Anna ignores calls. Henrik refuses to phone Anna. Nora determines Anna has crush on Johan, uses name as laptop password, finds festival receipt, Gothenburg ticket. Nora at bus terminal, Anna not boarded. Nora goes to Flatlines, "party organiser" did not see Anna, nor care about under-age drinking. Nora tells Henrik and police: Anna's missing. Nora meets Tor. Tor: mum's dead. Alex to Nora: nobody's seen Anna. Alex discovers ecstasy in Anna's stove. Police found Anna's phone at Stavsnäs marina.
25	2	"Blue Lies Part 2"	Mattias Ohlsson	Johan Widerberg, Mattias Ohlsson	Blå lögner	3 August 2020
Anna's underwear found at marina. Henrik to Nora: sorry for uncooperative responses. Anna's phone: video shows Johan. ICU nurse: Ines had ecstasy. Anna wakes, leg trapped between rocks. Alex to Nora: Tor's mother left 3 years earlier. Nora's hit; man runs off. Alex catches Johan, looking for hidden ecstasy. Vincent shows Johan news: wanted by police. Flashback: Johan gropes Ines, spikes drinks. Outside, Anna sees "drug baron" hand Johan large bag. Ines faints, Vincent and Johan drive Ines to hospital; dump her. Anna hears Johan say they have to silence Anna. Vincent finds Anna but motions to keep quiet. Current: Alex to Tor: mum's not dead. Vincent and Johan in Nacka, "drug baron" castigates them for women at transaction. Alex to Nora: CCTV depicts Ines and Anna with Vincent and Johan. At Vincent's mother's home, find Vincent groggy. Alex: where's Anna? Vincent: Kalvskär. On island, Nora finds Anna unconscious. Alex breaks into house nearby: gets blankets. Police free Anna: helicopter to hospital. Alex also finds bloodied floor, photo of Dennis and Johan. Anna to Nora: describes experiences. Alex visits Dennis, serves search warrant. Police catch Johan with bagful of pills. Dennis punches Alex. Both are arrested. Nora takes Anna home.
26	3	"The Twins Part 1"	Mattias Ohlsson	Sara Heldt, Mattias Ohlsson	Tvillingarna	10 August 2020
Wille's employee kills himself. Nora and Pär question Wille about financial irregularities, employee's death. Eva and Jonna: rezoning plan, sell factory site. Sebastian arrives late. Pär to Nora: Bauer share price rocketing. Sebastian to Jonna: need loan. Jonna: No, already owe 100,000. Eva collapses and hospitalised. Nora visits Gisela. Henrik calls Nora, Gisela takes over. Julia serves Nora at restaurant. Louie phones Julia: Wille, tomorrow 5pm. Bank freezes Sebastian's accounts. Eva: Jonna manage land deal. Sebastian: Jonna's taking over. Jonna: Sebastian wastes money. Sebastian to Wille: 2 million for Strömma's land. Wille to Sebastian: sign tonight. Tor catches more fish than Alex; cooked at Nora's. Sebastian emails contract to Wille. Pär: Wille's heavy debts, dodgy transactions. Wille throws party. Berit advises Alex: romance Nora. Wille to Sebastian: Clarissa's for hire. Clarissa to Sebastian: working to buy bar. Wille cuddles Clarissa, Sebastian wants payoff. Wille opens safe, takes gun, aims at Sebastian. Wille: only joking, insults Clarissa. Sebastian grapples Wille, gun fires, kills Wille. Sebastian gives Clarissa money to leave. Sebastian phones Jonna: needs help. Sebastian to Jonna: accident. Jonna turns death scene into robbery-murder. Jonna drives Sebastian’s boat, dumps bag evidence bag overboard. Twins argue, Jonna shoves Sebastian onto spike.
27	4	"The Twins Part 2"	Mattias Ohlsson	Sara Heldt, Mattias Ohlsson	Tvillingarna	10 August 2020
Jonna drives boat into island, hides money, drives from Strömma property. Police attend Wille’s corpse. Forensics: shot dead 12 hours ago, no fingerprints, cleaned up. Miriam: Wille investigated by prosecutor. Nora to Alex: checking Wille’s finances, nothing illegal, yet. Henrik: invest children's funds in Bauer, Eva leaves hospital, cannot contact Sebastian. Miriam: Sebastian's and Julia's phones active at murder time. Guests left before 8:30. Jonna to police: Sebastian's not here. Alex: Sebastian at Wille’s party. Jonna deletes phone messages. Nora: Wille’s purchasing Strömma land via Sebastian. Jonna returns to Sebastian's corpse: takes phone. Police find Sebastian, when notified Eva collapses. Louie advises Julia to get lawyer. Julia phones Sebastian; Jonna answers, Julia sends photo of Jonna leaving Wille’s with Sebastian. Julia sketchily describes her situation to Nora. Nora: go to police. Jonna offers Julia 2 million, meet at Strömma. Julia phones Louie: taking money and running. Miriam listened in. Nora: Julia was at Wille's. Jonna threatens Julia with gun, Julia gets away. Police: no sign of Julia. Eva and Jonna hold Sebastian’s funeral. Julia returns to flat, Alex holds her passport. Julia: ran because no one believes her. Both Julia and Jonna are arrested. Alex hands 2 million to Nora.
28	5	"The Promise Part 1"	Mattias Ohlsson	Sara Heldt, Martin Cronström	Löftet	17 August 2020
Fisherman finds dead woman in net. Kristina moves into Branska. Henrik's kicked out, wants to rent. Tor’s taken to Jackie for handball camp. Police attend corpse, Miriam: late 30s, dark blonde, 175 cm tall, pathologist unavailable. Nora, Gisela and Kristina share drinks. Kristina introduces Nora to Anders. Alex: What if corpse's Vicky? Miriam: corpse's in water for 12 months. Flashback: Anders and Sara having sex. Current: Gisela to Nora, Kristina and Anders: female corpse found. Gisela flirts with Anders: met via dating app? Anders denies it. Anders promises Kristina he will get divorce. Flashback Anders to Sara: timing's not right. Sara takes Anders' phone pretends to call his wife. Anders chokes Sara to death. Current: Kristina to Nora: Anders' married, has children. Gisela to Nora: met Anders before. Anders shows Kristina: divorce papers, wife will sign tonight. Bengt: corpse’s Sara. Petra: Sara dated married man, Anders, met via dating app. Miriam: found Sara’s profile, one not replied, "Sunny Man". Flashback: Anders greets children and Maria. Anders quizzes Maria over her shopping. Maria's afraid, leaving Anders. He mocks her. Maria's taking children: Anders slams her into stairs, continues beating Maria. Robert enters, hits Anders unconscious. Anders recovers but Robert drives family away.
29	6	"The Promise Part 2"	Mattias Ohlsson	Sara Heldt, Martin Cronström	Löftet	17 August 2020
Police search Sara's flat, Sara was pregnant. Flashback: Anders sees Robert and family together. Current: Kristina: met Anders via dating app, she's pregnant. Flashback: Anders goes under Robert's car. Current: Jackie summons Alex. Tor: mother's drowned corpse. Returns Tor to Berit’s. Flashback: Robert collects Maria’s suitcases. Anders notices Robert switched cars. Current: Alex uses dating app to meet "Sunny Man". Miriam waits, “Sunny Man” enters. Anders to Kristina: Maria did not sign, yet. Alex invites Nora for a meal. Robert sees Anders and Kristina, starts yelling. Anders: Robert's after his wife. Flashback: Anders trails Maria, tooting horn. Current: "Sunny Man" met Sara at bar. Milla to Miriam: Sara's date jealous of her ex. Kristina: Anders keeps stalling. Milla sends photo: Sara with Anders. Nora searches police register: Anders interviewed over fatal accident of wife and children. Nora to Alex: photo of Anders and Kristina. Nora to Kristina: Anders family died. Kristina: family all dead. Anders rages: they are not! Miriam finds Kristina alive. Anders at crash site. Flashback: Anders witnesses wife's car rolled, set on fire. Current Alex sees Anders walk into truck’s pathway. Nora sees Henrik and Gisela romancing. Nora cancels meal with Alex, to look after Kristina.
30	7	"Vicky Part 1"	Mattias Ohlsson	Gustaf Skördeman	Vicky	24 August 2020
Anna and Carolina welcome jubilee attendees. Nora greets Mona and Micke. Lisa awaits guests’ arrival, flirts with Martin. Carl-Johan's children gripe about attending. Henrik and Gisela living together. Guests perform potato sack relay. Alex visits Nora, greets Henrik and Gisela. Speeches begin with guests heckling. Alex meets Micke. Carl-Johan rudely cuts through speeches. Mats details father's humiliations. Carl-Johan's called away by minister. People leave table after Lisa follows Carl-Johan. Anna and Carolina in kitchen, hear yell. Anna follows Martin, finds Carl-Johan dead, Lisa crying, Vicky holding bloodied knife. Martin disarms Vicky. Alex attends corpse. Vicky's already taken in. Martin: perpetrator dropped knife, not seen before. At station, Alex sees Vicky, stops in shock. Bengt: Miriam take over, Alex home. Berit: something happened? Alex: Vicky's back, murder suspect. Henrik paints Anna’s room, pink. Vicky refuses to talk. Alex to Miriam: Vicky was in Philippines. Bengt: not allowed at station. Mats currently without tenure. Miriam sees Martin and Lisa in storeroom. Carolina to Miriam: not recognise Vicky. Lisa to Alex: did not see actual stabbing, recognises Vicky from photo as child, Carl-Johan's daughter. Vicky’s younger brother Kalle died. Flashback: Young Vicky looks at Kalle's floating body in lake. Carl-Johan yells, "you were meant to watch him".
31	8	"Vicky Part 2"	Mattias Ohlsson	Gustaf Skördeman	Vicky	24 August 2020
Alex: Vicky said father’s dead. Eva: Vicky let Kalle drown. Alex to Miriam: where were adults when Kalle drowned? Alex visits Vicky: shows Tor’s photo, Vicky does not talk, Alex screams, he’s removed. Mona invites Nora for meal. Alex to Nora: Vicky's back; murder suspect. Nora: tell Tor. At home, Nora orders Henrik and Gisela to leave. Alex and Tor visit Vicky, she does not talk. Bengt removes them. Vicky agrees to talk. Alex: how Tor felt, abandoned by Vicky. Flashback: Carl-Johan to Young Vicky: call if mum returns. Carl-Johan takes nanny in doors, Vicky warns mum’s here, Kalle drowned. Vicky could not reach Kalle. Current: Vicky: Carl-Johan already dead when entering, it was her brother, not Mats. Miriam: minister did not call. Bengt: unusual name on callers list, Mikael. Alex recognises Mikael: Nora's renter. Micke to Nora: met Vicky on flight, Kalle died while Carl-Johan had sex with nanny. Micke conceived when Mona raped. Micke asked Carl-Johan: acknowledge him. Micke: Carl-Johan lunged with knife, struggled, killed Carl-Johan, ran away. Micke confesses to Miriam. Nora gives statement. Alex hugs Vicky, takes her home. Tor sees Vicky: gives her hug, both cry. Anna hates pink room, stays with Nora, overnight.

=== Season 8 ===
No. overall	No. in season	Title	Directed by	Written by	Based on	Original release date
32	1	"Angelica Part 1"	Mattias Ohlsson	Sara Heldt, Johan Widerberg	Angelica	8 August 2022
Angelica's corpse is dumped in a shallow grave. Nora and Pär bring charges against Leo over her disappearance and murder – dismissed due to insufficient evidence. Nora's home is infested with deathwatch beetles – Olle recommends tearing it down and rebuilding. Alex and Bengt hunt down and arrest Sylvester. Ursula claims Sylvester has no knowledge of stolen goods. Bengt distracts Ursula and assaults Sylvester. After police provide substantial evidence of his crimes, Sylvester asks to speak with Nora. He flirts with Nora, wants to avoid prison and claims he knows Angelica's killer. Sylvester does not want police involvement. He hands over his locker key. Finding that Vicky left Tor alone at home, Alex believes she ran off. Upon returning Vicky asks whether Alex trusts her? Nora and Pär find photos showing Bengt having sex with Angelica – same day she disappeared. Bengt asks Nora to authorise Sylvester's prison transfer. Sylvester tells Nora she will get hard drive only if he obtains reduced sentence. Bengt watches Sylvester through one-way mirror. Nora shows Bengt's photos to Alex and hands over key. Alex tells Bengt that Sylvester has revealed the location of his stolen goods. Workers find Angelica's decomposing corpse.
33	2	"Angelica Part 2"	Mattias Ohlsson	Sara Heldt, Johan Widerberg	Angelica	8 August 2022
Nora twists her ankle on rotted boards. Henrik tells her: Gisela's pregnant. Jonas retired due to aviophobia. Alex and Miriam attend Angelica's corpse. Sylvester sketches Nora as Aphrodite. Alex tells Bengt: foreign DNA found inside Angelica. Bengt: it is his sperm. He claims Angelica was afraid to leave Leo. Later Bengt reconciled with Kerstin. Alex gives him two days to find incriminating evidence. Ursula approaches Leo: provide Sylvester with lifetime job in exchange for photos showing Leo killing Angelica. Flashback: Angelica tells Leo she's leaving; he chokes her. Current: Leo hires two henchmen to torture Pär into revealing where Sylvester is sent. Bengt tells Kerstin he's leaving for two days. Henchmen's car rams transfer vehicle: makes it roll, guards knocked out. After Sylvester provides the hard drive's location henchmen bomb vehicle killing guards. Bengt follows Leo to the fortress locker. Nora to Karin: Leo's dead. Karin: Sylvester had other lockers. Nora and Alex travel to locker. Alex and Bengt confront Leo who takes Karin hostage. Leo shoots Bengt; runs off with Alex chasing, Nora disables Leo, who is arrested. She asks Eva to organise another trial for Leo. Nora consoles Pär. Sylvester observes his funeral. Nora sells her home.
34	3	"Lili Part 1"	Mattias Ohlsson	Sara Heldt, Johan Widerberg	Lili	15 August 2022
Surfacing in seawater, Theo screams for Lili. He dives again to look. Tor and Vicky return from a game. Alex cooked dinner but leaves to investigate Lili's disappearance. Theo to police: Lili had postpartum depression but was recovering. According to Theo she jumped off with anchor rope tied to her ankles. Nora leaves her new home as Henrik arrives with his baby. Nora refuses to look after her. Nora meets and rebuffs Jonas – does not want romance – he faints. Theo asks Evelina to become live-in babysitter. Alex and Vicky attend couples therapy: both are dissatisfied with their marriage. Jonas claims to have heart problems and agrees to stay with Nora. Boat's anchor is found but no body. Theo seeks comfort from Evelina: he makes a pass but she recoils. Anki to police: Theo abused and then killed Lili. Theo to Alex: Anki's unstable and makes false accusations. Tor tells Alex: not to stay with Vicky for his sake. Police find a female corpse but Theo says its not Lili. Anki visits Albert while Theo is away. Theo arrives and threatens to kill Anki in front of Evelina. After Jonas leaves for medical tests, Lili arrives at Nora's home.
35	4	"Lili Part 2"	Mattias Ohlsson	Sara Heldt, Johan Widerberg	Lili	15 August 2022
Lili: Theo abused her, pushed her off boat. Theo gambled away their fortune. She hid in Therese's summerhouse. Valpen finds no evidence of Theo assaulting Lili. Lili wants Albert's custody but Theo would win. Lili and Evelina conspire against Theo. Theo insured Lili for 50 million kr but requires her body. Therese phones Theo: Lili on Sandhamn. To protect Lili, Nora diverts Jonas to her shed. Valpen: Theo has massive gambling debts. Theo searches Sandhamn. Nora asks Henrik to find Jonas' illness. Theo manhandles Evelina over unknown calls. Theo apologises, claims he's overwrought. Police ask Theo about Lili's insurance and his gambling. Theo: find Lili instead. Theo accosts Anki accusing her of hiding Lili. Nora convinces Lili to see Alex. Theo wakes in his car with bloodied fists. Evelina packs up Albert but Theo stops her. Alex and Valpen find Anki's corpse. Nora to Alex: Lili's alive. Evelina distracts Theo. Lili knocks him out, collects Albert and gets her passport. Theo recovers and finds them. Nora, Alex and Valpen arrive. Theo's boat drives off leaving Evelina. Nora and Alex find Lili and Albert. She claims Theo jumped off. Theo's anchored below water. Nora expels Jonas, who faked his anxiety attack. Alex and Vicky reconcile.
36	5	"Olivia Part 1"	Mattias Ohlsson	Sara Heldt, Johan Widerberg	Olivia	22 August 2022
Hooded figure enters school carrying shotgun. Three days earlier: Olivia to Nathalie: trust fund nearly due. Jörgen drives boatload of youths to campsite. Pär tells Nora: Olivia's suspicious of Johanna's mismanagement. Jörgen directs youths to start lunch. Both Olivia and Sebastian are missing. Soon Sebastian drives by in Jörgen's boat. Nathalie's worried: Olivia not answering. Sebastian crashes boat near Alex' jetty, Alex takes him back to Jörgen. Nathalie challenges Sebastian over Olivia. Jörgen to Nora and Pär: Olivia absconded. Jörgen claims Olivia will return; youths feel safe in his care. Sebastian shows Nathalie photo of Olivia talking to Johanna near campsite. Sebastian cannot remember lawyer's name. Nathalie shows Jörgen same photo but he fobs her off. Sebastian advises Nathalie: take hostages to make police listen. Alex to Nora: Sebastian has court tomorrow. Nathalie asks Valpen to find Olivia. He replies Jörgen has not filed missing persons report. Frustrated Nathalie storms off. Sebastian asks Johanna: where's Olivia but she laughs him off. Johanna talks to another man. Sebastian agrees to meet Nora. However Sebastian overdoses. Nathalie collects shotgun, enters school. Nathalie fires guns into roof. She threatens to shoot hostages including Tor. Nathalie phones Valpen: holding hostages.
37	6	"Olivia Part 2"	Mattias Ohlsson	Sara Heldt, Johan Widerberg	Olivia	22 August 2022
Alex hears about hostages, drives to school leaving Vicky behind, who follows. Bengt sees Alex sneak into gym. Pär to Nora: Olivia and Sebastian's lawyer's Johanna. Nathalie tells police she will kill hostages soon. Armed response moves into position. Alex tries to talk Johanna down, repositions himself preventing sniper shot. Nathalie wants help to find Olivia. Nathalie shoots entering armed officers but shot by sniper. Alex follows paramedics taking Nathalie. Tor and Vicky leave. Nora and Pär visit Johanna's home. Olivia, trapped in basement room, refuses meals. Nurse to Alex:Nathalie will survive, unconscious now. Nora, Alex, Valpen and Bengt confer. Nathalie believes Olivia was kidnapped and Jörgen's lying. Bengt orders Alex: go home. Vicky rails at Alex. Vicky and Tor leave Alex. Alex visits Nathalie but falls asleep; Nathalie sneaks off. Jörgen phones Johanna: police here. Johanna: say nothing. Jörgen admits Johanna embezzled Olivia's trust fund and suggests search Johanna's home. Johanna about to drug Olivia but knocked-out by Nathalie. Nathalie finds Olivia locked up, searches Johanna for the key. Johanna injects Nathalie but gets stabbed in turn. Nathalie staggers, drops key near Olivia's door. Alex and Nora arrive. Nora comforts Olivia; paramedics treat Nathalie. Olivia and Nathalie hospitalised.

=== Season 9 ===
No. overall	No. in season	Title	Directed by	Written by	Based on	Original release date
38	1	"Nadia part 1" (Nadia del 1)	Mattias Ohlsson	Sara Heldt, Johan Widerberg	Nadia	3 April 2023
Nora jogs along beach front, finds injured, unconscious Nadia. Nora takes bedraggled Nadia home to recover. Nadia relates escaping from container ship; held together with other women from Tunis. Nadia afraid that traffickers will recapture or kill her if police are informed. Nora tends Nadia's wound; promises to wait before informing police. Tor sets up Alex to meet Karro for breakfast. Nadia feigns slumber. While fishing Olle and Anton encounter deserted, blood-stained sailboat. Nora asks Pär to investigate recent cargo ships, which Nadia could have been on. Pär organises Karro's welcoming party. Alex and Karro have sex. Alex and Valpen respond to sailboat. Nora goes to work; Pär has cooked a cake for Karro. Forensic technician describe to Alex and Valpen that she found three sets of shoe prints on sailboat; blood sent for analysis. Anton gives Alex cufflink, which he found on sailboat. Nora greets Karro and asks about illegal immigrants. Nora promises Nadia to protect her from criminals. Olof introduces Michel to Alex and Valpen; he will liaise for the investigation. When Nora tells Nadia that no ship matches her description, Nadia walks off. Michel describes Corsican mafia and links to terrorists. Valpen announces Gabriel's DNA on sailboat.
39	2	"Nadia part 2" (Nadia del 2)	Mattias Ohlsson	Sara Heldt, Johan Widerberg	Nadia	10 April 2023
Michel searches sailboat on Djurö. Alex and Michel respond to corpse, which Michel identifies as Gabriel. Alex and Michel visit Nora; Nadia hides but recognises Michel. Alex informs Nora of blood-stained sailboat. Michel sees Nadia's clothes on line. Nadia kidnaps Nora, prepares to imitate Nora and use her passport. Michel searches Nora's home, sees Nadia's hair. Nadia fights and stabs Michel. Nadia and Nora run to powerboat; Michel shoots as they escape. Olof brags to Valpen about his French-speaking skills. Olof calls Alex to return to work. Pär informs Karro of Nora's kidnapping. Olof introduces real French police officer, Michelle, who explains how Sébastien infiltrated them. Alex, Valpen and Michelle go to Nora's place. Sébastien steals powerboat. Nadia and Nora arrive at her workplace. Pär hides and hears that Nadia's taking Nora to Djurö. Alex and police enter Nora's home; find Sébastien's blood and Nadia's hair. Karro alerts Alex that Nadia took Nora. Police head to Djurö. At sailboat, Sébastien kills guards, recovers hidden drugs. Nadia arrives takes guard's gun; tries to steal drugs from Sébastien. Nadia and Sébastien threaten each other with guns. Police arrive brandishing their weapons. Sébastien and Nadia are killed in gunfight. Valpen and Pär are dating.
40	3	"Esther part 1" (Esther del 1)	Mattias Ohlsson	Martin Cronström, Sara Heldt, Sebastian Johansson	Ester	17 April 2023
Students open old root cellar on Knappholmen. Inside are two skeleton. Alex and Karro discuss living together. Henrik asks Nora to attend Munchkin's christening. Bengt dispatches Alex and Valpen to Knappholmen, where Church of Sweden runs confirmation camp. "Technician" describes two youths were trapped alive; 25–30 years ago. Ingrid remembers three disappeared 30 years earlier presumed drowned; group photo depicts Johan, Petter and Esther. Also present are Nora, Henrik and Gisela. Iris and Arne ran camp that year. Dental records confirm skeletons' identities. Henrik informs Nora of skeletons – no Esther. 1992: Arne instructs campers, introduces supervisors. 2022: Arne indicates no suspicion of impending disaster. Iris and Arne separated soon after. Iris disappointed by poor investigation. 1992: Josef reports Johan, Petter and Esther are missing. Police discover overturned powerboat. 2022: Iris describes boys as bullies with no other friends. Josef dropped studies, became alcoholic. Josef reads article about skeletons; kept Esther's bible and photo. 1992: Esther tells Josef she's pregnant. 2022: Gisela remembers Josef as strange, upset by accident. 1992: Gisela and Henrik kiss. Later she sees Johan and Petter. 2022: Nora and Henrik confirm they were kissing on beach. 1992: Henrik and Nora share wine; see speedboat passes with three aboard.
41	4	"Esther part 2" (Esther del 2)	Mattias Ohlsson	Martin Cronström, Sara Heldt, Sebastian Johansson	Esther	24 April 2023
Nora questions Henrik's cheating with underage Gisela. 1992: Esther discusses biblical instruction "be fruitful". 2022 Henrik describes Esther's pregnancy. Alex visits Nora; Nora regrets not choosing better life partners. Alex hears that Iris was found dead. Iris strangled by rope. Police view CCTV; both Arne and Josef visited Iris. Arne recalls he defended himself against Iris but left her alive. Josef lives on boat: Esther. Alex and Valpen examine unoccupied boat. Iris kept Esther's letters; Esther stayed with Iris' sister and was told Josef suicided. Esther still living in Tallinn. Estonian policeman Mart takes Alex and Valpen to Esther's convent. Alex sees Esther with Josef. Alex and Valpen catch Josef. Esther had miscarriage in Tallinn. Josef found Iris hanging; unsuccessful at reviving her. Josef reads Iris' letter to Esther. 1992: Esther finds Johan and Petter drinking. She empties their bottle; they attack. She knocks Johan's head with rock; Iris hits Petter with branch. Iris moves bodies into root cellar; locks it. Iris takes Esther away by speedboat. Petter wakes in root cellar but cannot get out. 2022: Josef and Esther will live together. Back in Nacka, Alex breaks up with Karro. Nora, Anna and Simon attend Munchkin's christening. Nora and Alex kiss.
42	5	"Max part 1" (Max del 1)	Mattias Ohlsson	Martin Cronström, Sara Heldt, Mattias Ohlsson	Max	1 May 2023
Max photographs Nora and Alex. He follows Nora home. Max enters Alex' boat; sees Tor's picture. Max uses 3D printer to copy Alex' key. Adds Alex and Nora photos onto his board. Max drives cleaner's van to Tor's school. Max has Tor direct him to toilets. Max thwarted when another student leaves toilet. Pär to lead his first case. Police station's gym used by local students. Bengt directs Alex and Valpen to investigate Resarö corpse. Pär to determine theft from Sören's garden centre, Rosarö. Max uses Alex' key to park van in police basement; sets six bombs for 8 hours. Max kills policeman. "Technician" determines Sören fell down drunk or heart attack. Alex agrees to meet Nora but Max anaesthetises Alex. Nora cannot find or contact Alex. Alex wakes in Max' basement; cable tied to chair. Max tells Alex about bombs; threatens to torture Alex. Max leaves Alex facing his wall of photos. Flashback: Alex and colleague place Björn in police cell; they miss Björn's epilepsy warning. Police called away by riot. Present: Max turns Alex towards computer screens. Max describes search for Björn; however Björn died in police custody. Max shows Alex Nora phoning him before subduing Alex, again.
43	6	"Max part 2" (Max del 2)	Mattias Ohlsson	Martin Cronström, Sara Heldt, Mattias Ohlsson	Max	8 May 2023
Nora arrives home, tries phone. It chimes nearby. Max subdues Nora. Pär learns of Sören's death; drives to police. Pär tells Valpen of Sören's thefts; could be terrorism. Max driving boat; Nora revives, jumps off. Alex revives, wobbles chair toward shelving. Max finds Nora's escaped. Max jabs Alex with green liquid, then subdues him. Old couple assist Nora; she phones Pär who arrives with Valpen. They talk to Sören's friend Fredrik. Fredrik believes thief was Max. Valpen alerts Bengt. Max visits mother at nursing home, who tells him to find forgiveness. Bengt and policeman ask to talk to Max' mother. Bengt sees Max, who runs off. Max knocks out policeman. Alex frees himself from cable ties. When Max empties his gun, Bengt arrests him. Alex hijacks car. Bengt questions Max. Alex arrives at station; warns Bengt about bomb. Bengt goes upstairs to evacuate children. Alex goes to van. Nora's group arrive at Max' dad's place; find dad's decaying corpse. On CCTV they see Alex trying to disconnect bombs; one explodes. Bengt finds severely injured Alex. Nora arrives at hospital; Alex' unconscious. Henrik supports Nora. Alex briefly wakes but flatlines. Dream sequence: Alex and Nora marry; return home and go for swim.

=== Season 10 ===
Broadcast on TV4 in August 2024.

=== Season 11 ===
Broadcast on TV4 in August 2025.

== Reception ==
DVD Kritik's Maria Eremo, reflected on the first season, "even if there are some mistakes in policing... it makes it all a bit comical." In particular, Pekkari is "incredibly good" as Carina, and "makes the best impression." A "good effort" by Malmsjö as Henrik, who portrays "the jealous husband," as "not a very nice guy." The story is supported by, "very dramatic music," which "adds to the tension."

Thomas of Punk Rock Theary reviewed a box set of the first three seasons of The Sandhamn Murders. He observed, "as the series goes on, [Nora's] role becomes more important", while "the stories are only very loosely connected because the main characters are the same." Overall, "some of the plot twists are pretty far-fetched while some other developments are predictable doesn't exactly help speed things along." TV Show Pilot's Justine Naboya included the series, as one of The 20 Best Scandinavian Crime Dramas, and noticed, "more often than not, the cases are revealed to be much more complex than they had initially (been) presumed."

Expressen's Mattias Bergqvist felt Season 7 provides, "a breath of fresh and liberating" air. Its episodes are, "the first to leave [Sten's] novels", which provides "a freedom that is absolutely necessary to keep interest."
