= David and the Magic Pearl =

- Directed by: Zbigniew Stanislawski; Wieslaw Zieba
- Written by: Maciej Siatkiewicz (story and dialogue); Wieslaw Zieba; Zbigniew Stanislawski; Robert Pawlicki; Piotr Malinowski; Ewaryst Izewski; Jerzy Kurczac; Wojciech Trzópek; Krystyna Kofta (inspiration); Andrzej Chrzanowski(inspiration)
- Produced by: Elisabeth Wesdecki
- Starring: Ewa Kania; Ewa Zlotowska; Jolanta Zykun; Ewa Zukowska; Jerzy Molga; Tadeusz Wludarski
- Cinematography: Jan Ptasinski
- Edited by: Hanna Michalewicz
- Music by: Seweryn Krajewski (original); Claes Wang (Swedish/English version)
- Distributed by: Przedsiębiorstwo Dystrybucji Filmów (Poland); AB Svensk Filmindustri (Sweden); Celebrity Home Entertainment (USA)
- Release dates: 22 June 1988 (Poland); 5 November 1988 (Sweden); 16 June 1989 (U.S.); 9 October 1993 (Finland)
- Running time: 71 minutes
- Countries: Poland; Sweden
- Language: Polish

David and the Magic Pearl (sw. David och de magiska pärlorna; pol. Dawid i Sandy; known as David & Sandy internationally) is a Polish/Swedish animated film released in 1988.

== Summary ==
David, a boy who stays with his parents in a small cabin in a jungle, gets a puppy named Pips for his birthday, he also befriends a baby eagle who he names Sandy. They discover that Mr. Stealmore (named in the English version) is after a set of pearls which were to be kept safe by a group of aliens who landed in the jungle. Also they meet a woman named Fawn Doe who is a slave to Mr. Stealmore, who captures animals and placing them in cages. Later, David learned that Fawn is not as bad as she seems and she changed into nature clothes now as Nature woman who understands why it is important for the pearls to be protected. Now, the trio have to band together and save the jungle from Mr. Stealmore, who has also plotted to bulldoze the jungle and build a mine in its place.

== Cast ==
Character	Swedish	Polish	English
David	Martin Lindström	Ewa Złotowska	Christine Cavanaugh
Madame Rusk (Fawn Do)	Mia Benson	Ewa Kania	Wanda Nowicki
David's Father	Gunnar Ernblad	Jerzy Molga	Doug Stone
David's Mother	Gunilla Norling	Ewa Żukowska	Melora Harte
The Boss (Mr. Stealmore)	Åke Lindström	Tadeusz Włudarski	Steve Kramer
Samuel	Unknown	Jerzy Molga	
Pink Elephant	Unknown	Tadeusz Włudarski	
Cave Tiki	Unknown	Unknown	Peter St. Peter
Pips	Unknown	Unknown	Bob Bergen
Woman	Unknown	Unknown	Lara Cody

=== Additional Voices ===
- Barbara Goodson

== Awards ==
- 1987 – Wiesław Zięba Award of the Head of Cinematography in the field of animated film
- 1988 – Wiesław Zięba Poznań (FF for Children) – Children's Jury Award

== See also ==
- List of animated feature films of 1988
