= International Sámi Film Institute =

The International Sámi Film Institute (ISFI) (Northern Sami: Internašunála Sámi Filbmainstituhtta), is an organization dedicated to providing Sámi people with the skills and economic opportunities in developing, producing, and distributing Sámi films in the Sámi language. It is owned by the Norwegian Sámi Parliament, the government of Norway, and Kautokeino Municipality.

The International Sámi Film Institute was founded as the International Sámi Film Centre AS in 2007 in Guovdageaidnu (Kautokeino), Norway. The initial capital was 1.5 million NOK provided by the Norwegian Ministry of Culture for film activities, and an additional 300.000 NOK from the Norwegian Sámi Parliament. During the autumn of 2014, the International Sámi Filmcenter was renamed the International Sámi Film Institute.

== Vision ==
The vision of the International Sámi Film Institute is to provide the Sámi population with competence and a better economic foundation to develop, produce and screen their own films in the Sámi language. The institute also conducts continuous documentation activities on Sámi history, culture and society. The Institute supports script development, organizes production workshops, strengthens the local film industry, assists with promotion and allocates funding directly to production budgets.

Its main aims are:

- To enhance and promote Sámi film production;
- To support the development and the production of Sámi films; documentaries, fiction and animation in the official Sámi areas;
- To promote indigenous films and cooperation between indigenous film workers at a global level;
- To enhance and promote films in Sámi language and films for Sámi youth and children.

The ISFI awards grants for the development and production of short film and documentary film projects, as well as other formats that are considered to be particularly important for the development of Sámi film. Grants are awarded with the aim of raising awareness about Sámi films and improving the specialist Sámi film-making skills of the local people and film workers. There is a special focus on improving skills in the area of live images and raising awareness about Sámi film as an artistic expression.

The ISFI also aims to promote indigenous films and help indigenous film-makers from all over the world to work together. The objective of promoting Sámi film must therefore be primarily interpreted from a cultural context, rather than from the context of the Sámi people's state of affiliation. The Sámi language is the most important criterion used by the ISFI to determine what constitutes sámi film. The aim is to ensure that Sámi audiences are provided with a good selection of films in their own language, based on their own culture.

The International Sami Film Institute also works to support and promote Sámi film production and the Sámi film industry throughout Sápmi, in Norway, Sweden, Finland and Russia. It cooperates internationally with the UArctic network, Sundance Institute's Indigenous Program and the Arctic Indigenous Film Fund.

== Films supported by the ISFI ==
=== Documentary films ===
- Kaisa’s Enchanted Forest (Katja Gauriloff, 2016)
- Bihttoš (Elle Máijá Tailfeathers)
- Colors and Life (Harry Johansen)
- Great Grandmothers – Three Unknown Heroines (John E Utsi)
- The Secret Helpers (Harry Johansen)

=== Feature films ===
- Sami Blood (Amanda Kernell, 2016)
- My Fathers' Daughter (Egil Pedersen, 2024)

=== Short films ===
- Vilda duottar (2009)
- Aurora Keeps an Eye On You (Sara Margrete Oskal)
- Stoerre Vaerie (Amanda Kernell, 2015)
- Áigin (Jouni West)
- Bonki (Silja Somby)
- Leaving the Herd (Egil Pedersen, 2013)
- Sámi Moments (Ken Are Bongo)
- Juoigangiehta (Elle Sofe Henriksen)
- Eahpáraš (Anne Merete A. Gaup)

=== Television ===
- Boaimmášbárdni (2013)
