= Julius Fleischanderl =

Swedish actor (born 1993)

- Born: Nils Julius Fleischanderl; April 24, 1993 (age 33)
- Citizenship: Swedish
- Occupation: Actor
- Years active: 2012-present
- Known for: Morden I Sandhamn
- Height: 178 cm (5 ft 10 in)

Nils Julius Fleischanderl (born 24 April 1993) is a Swedish actor.

== Biography ==
Fleischanderl first appeared in a short film, Repressed by director Jimmy Olsson, where he played the role of an alcoholic man. In 2014 he played alongside Felice Jankell and Hedda Stiernstedt in the Swedish-German co-production Unga Sophie Bell.

Fleischanderl became known to a wider audience in 2016 when he starred in Amanda Kernell's drama Sami Blood. In 2020 he played one of the main characters in the tv show Cryptid.

In 2021 Fleischanderl was part of the cast of the self-discovery drama Granada Nights by Abid Khan and the serie Två systrar. From 2022 to 2024 he played police rookie "Valpen" (English: "Puppy") in the crime show Morden I Sandhamn.

The following year he was Stanislaw Przybyszewski in Munch. In 2025 he took part in The Breakthrough playing Ante Persson.

== Filmography ==
- 2005: Om du var jag
- 2012: Repressed
- 2013: Cesar
- 2013: Gustafsson 3 tr
- 2014: Unga Sophie Bell
- 2015: Welcome to Sweden
- 2015: Der Kommissar und das Meer
- 2016: Sami Blood
- 2020: Cryptid
- 2021: Granada Nights
- 2022-2024: Morden I Sandhamn
- 2023: Munch
- 2025: The Breakthrough
