= My Fathers' Daughter =

2024 film by Egil Pedersen

- Norwegian theatrical release poster
- Northern Sami: Biru Unjárga
- Directed by: Egil Pedersen
- Written by: Egil Pedersen
- Produced by: Mathis Ståle Mathisen; Pål Røed; Aleksander Olai Korsnes
- Starring: Sarah Olaussen Eira; Ingá Elisá Påve Idivuoma; Aslat Máhtte Gaup; Amund Lode; Ánne Mággá Wigelius; Sara Sofia Mienna; Nikolaj Coster-Waldau
- Cinematography: Anna Myking
- Production companies: Rein Film; Paasan; Oktober; Bautafilm; Filmpool Nord
- Distributed by: Pluto Film
- Release dates: 9 September 2024 (TIFF); 27 September 2024 (Norway)
- Running time: 78 minutes
- Countries: Norway; Sweden; Finland
- Languages: Northern Sámi; Danish; English; Norwegian

My Fathers' Daughter (Northern Sami: Biru Unjárga, lit. 'Fucking Unjárga') is a 2024 coming-of-age comedy drama film directed by Egil Pedersen in his feature directorial debut. It premiered at the Toronto International Film Festival on 9 September 2024.

== Premise ==
Elvira, a Sámi teenager who was raised by a lesbian single mother in Unjárga, is convinced that her biological father is a famous movie star. When she meets her actual biological father, she has to come to terms with her identity.

== Cast ==
- Sarah Olaussen Eira as Elvira
- Ingá Elisá Påve Idivuoma as Beate
- Aslat Máhtte Gaup as Terje
- Amund Lode
- Ánne Mággá Wigelius
- Sara Sofia Mienna
- Nikolaj Coster-Waldau as himself

== Production ==
Partially funded by the International Sámi Film Institute, the film is a co-production of Norway, Sweden, and Finland, which contain the Sápmi cultural region. Filming took place between Unjárga and Čáhcesuolu in mid-2023.

== Release ==
Pluto Film acquired the international distribution rights to the film in July 2024. The first trailer was released on 28 August 2024. The film premiered at the 2024 Toronto International Film Festival as part of its Discovery program.

== Reception ==
Kevin Jagernauth of The Film Verdict called the film a "charming coming-of-age dramedy". Alex Heeney of Seventh Row called it "a sharp, satirical look at the irony of trying on different identities you can't claim in search of your own identity".
