= Amanda Kernell =

Swedish-Sámi film director and screenwriter

- Born: 9 September 1986; Tegs församling
- Awards: Guldbagge Award for Best Screenplay (Sami Blood, 2017); Guldbagge Award for Best Director (Charter, 2020); Samiska rådets kulturpris (2017)
- Website: www.amandakernell.com

Amanda Kernell (Swedish: [ɕæˈɳɛlː]; born 9 September 1986) is a Swedish, Southern Sami director and screenwriter. She is best known for the movie Sami Blood (2016).

== Early life and education ==
Amanda Kernell was born on 9 September 1986 in Umeå. Her mother is Swedish, but through her father, she developed roots in Sami culture. Kernell experienced two very different cultures growing up with divorced parents with her mother being Swedish and her father being Sami. Her grandparents were nomadic reindeer herding families and only spoke Sami. They were only assimilated into the Swedish society once they went to residential schools in Sweden.

In her early teens, she devoted herself to acting and directing within the municipal theater. In the years 2009–2013, Kernell attended and graduated from the National Film School of Denmark in Copenhagen.

Kernell studied writing for the stage and audio visual media at Biskops-Arno, where she also completed the Filpool Nord course "Screenwriting for low-budget feature films". Beginning in 2009, Kernell attended the National Film school of Denmark, being one of the six students they bring in every two years.

== Career ==
Kernell worked as a film educator in Västerbotten County.

In 2004 Amanda Kernell played the role of Lovisa in the short film Maison, directed by Ann Holmgren. The story was about a daughter who was trying to connect with her closed off mother. Amanda Kernell's filmographic career began in 2006 when she started directing shorts for the production company The Director & Fabrikorn, including The Holiday Sister, best short at the 2009 BUFF Children and Young Adult Film Festival and To Share Everything which received the 1km Film Award.

Her directorial debut film was the short film Our Disco (Våra discon).

Her short film Northern Great Mountain (Stoerre Vaerie), premiered at the 2015 Sundance Film Festival, and was later incorporated into her feature film debut Sami Blood, which premiered at the 2016 Venice International Film Festival.

Charter is her second feature film. Kernell is scriptwriter for most of her films.

=== Style and themes ===
Kernell states that "In my films, I always deal with topics such as forgiveness, responsibility, and betrayal." She tends to use close up shots and put a lot of the emphasis of the story on the actors. She prefers a "minimalistic form when shooting films, with camerawork that gets up close to characters and avoid overloading the movie with the decor or setting." Kernell believes that by doing this she will help the audience feel less lonely. Kernell loves to delve into the histories of her stories and incorporate how past events have their effects on society today. In Sami Blood she cast family members as extras because she believes it important that filmmakers tell their own stories.

Kernell makes a point of representing her fear through the story of Charter. She explored the experience of what it would be like to be a single mother of divorce and fighting for custody over a child.

== Personal life ==
As of 2016 Kernell was living in Copenhagen, where, in addition to film-making, she also teaches film directing.

== Filmography ==
=== Feature films ===
Year	English Title	Original Title	Notes
2017	Sami Blood	Sameblod	
2020	Charter		
2026	Brace Your Heart	Garrat du Váimmu	

=== Short films ===
- Våra Discon (Our Disco) (2007)
- Spel (Game) (2008)
- Sommarsystern (Summer Sister)(2008)
- Att dela allt (To Share Everything) (2009)
- Det kommer aldrig att gå över (It Will Never Go Over) (2011)
- Paradiset (Paradise) (2014)
- Northern Great Mountain, also Norra Storfjället (2015) – a pilot and short film that forms the basis for the movie Sami blood
- I Will Always Love You Kingen (2016)

== Awards and nominations ==
- 2013, Uppsala short film pitch, Uppsala Film Festival
- 2015, Best Swedish Short Film, Uppsala Film Festival
- 2015, Audience Award: Best Swedish Short Film, Göteborg Film Festival

For Sami Blood:

- 2016: Best Young Director, Venice Film Festival
- 2016: Europa Cinemas Label for best European film, Venice Film Festival
- 2016: Special Jury Prize, Tokyo International Film Festival
- 2016: 2016 Toronto International Film Festival
- 2017: Dragon Award for Best Nordic Film, Gothenburg Film Festival
- 2017: Kurt Linder Scholarship from the Swedish Film Academy
- 2017, Lux Prize, 74th Venice International Film Festival
- 2017, Guldbagge Award for Best Screenplay
- 2018: Four Golden Beetles at the Guldbagge Awards, including Best Screenplay; Best Actress (Lene Cecilia Sparrok); Best Editing (Anders Skov) and Guldbagge Audience Award for Best Film, 53rd Guldbagge Awards

For Charter:

- 2020: Nominated for Nordic Council Film Prize
- 2020: Selected as Sweden's entry for the Oscar for best international film for 2021 Oscars by the Swedish academy award committee
- 2020: Nominated in seven categories at the Guldbagge Awards: best film, best director, best screenplay, best actress, best supporting actor, best cinemagraphy, and best film design

Other awards and recognition:

- 2018: Dagens Nyheter Culture Prize in 2018
- 2018: Swedish UN Federation's award for human rights
- 2021: Guldbagge Award for Best Director
