= Rebecka Teper =

Swedish actress (1972–2023)

- Born: 26 July 1972
- Died: 8 April 2023 (aged 50)
- Occupation: Actor

Åsa Rebecka Teper (26 July 1972 – 8 April 2023) was a Swedish actress who was known for her roles in television series like Solsidan, Morden i Sandhamn and Bonusfamiljen. She also had roles in Skärgårdsdoktorn, Skilda världar and in the film Stockholm East.

== Filmography ==
- 1996 – Rederiet (TV series)
- 1996 – Anna Holt – Polis (TV series)
- 1997 – Snoken (TV series)
- 1997 – Skärgårdsdoktorn (TV series)
- 1997 – Pappas flicka (TV series)
- 1999 – Ett litet rött paket (TV series)
- 2000 – Brottsvåg (TV series)
- 2001 – Återkomsten (TV series)
- 2001 – Syndare i sommarsol
- 2001 – Gustav III:s äktenskap (TV series)
- 2002 – Skilda världar (TV series)
- 2002 – Livet i 8 bitar
- 2002 – The Dog Trick
- 2002 – Hjälp! Rånare! (TV series)
- 2007 – Hjälp! (TV series)
- 2009 – Scener ur ett kändisskap
- 2010 – Våra vänners liv (TV series)
- 2010–2021 – Solsidan (TV series)
- 2011 – Stockholm Östra
- 2012 – Morden i Sandhamn (TV series)
- 2013 – Emil & Ida i Lönneberga (voice)
- 2015 – Beck – Rum 302
- 2017 – Solsidan
- 2017–2019 – Bonusfamiljen (TV series)
- 2018 – Springfloden (TV series)
