= Sami Blood =

2016 Swedish film by Amanda Kernell

- Swedish: Sameblod
- Directed by: Amanda Kernell
- Written by: Amanda Kernell
- Produced by: Lars G. Lindström
- Starring: Lene Cecilia Sparrok; Mia Erika Sparrok; Maj Doris Rimpi; Julius Fleischanderl; Hanna Alström
- Cinematography: Sophia Olsson; Petrus Sjövik
- Edited by: Anders Skov
- Music by: Kristian Eidnes Andersen
- Production companies: Nordisk Film Production Sverige AB; Bautafilm AB; Digipilot A/S; Nordisk Film Production A/S; Sveriges Television AB
- Release dates: September 8, 2016 (Venice Film Festival); March 3, 2017 (Sweden); March 9, 2017 (Denmark)
- Countries: Sweden; Denmark; Norway
- Languages: Swedish; Southern Sami; English

Sami Blood (Swedish: Sameblod) is a 2016 Swedish coming-of-age drama film written and directed by Amanda Kernell, as her feature film debut. The first 10 minutes of the film (and part of the end) comes directly from the short film Stoerre Vaerie (2015, dir. Amanda Kernell). Stoerre Vaerie is Kernell's first film with Sami themes and it was nominated for the Short Film Grand Jury Prize at the Sundance Film Festival, Park City, Utah, United States.

The film is set in Sweden in the 1930s and concerns a 14-year-old girl who experiences prejudice at a nomad school for Sami children, and decides to escape her town and disavow her Sami heritage. Parts of the story are inspired by Kernell's own grandmother.

The film premiered at the 73rd edition of the Venice Film Festival in the Venice Days section, in which it was awarded the Europa Cinemas Label Award and the Fedeora Award for Best Debut Director. It won the 2017 Lux Prize and was nominated for the 2017 Nordic Council Film Prize.

== Plot ==
In 2017, 78-year-old Christina comes with her son Olle and granddaughter Sanna to a small town in Swedish Lapland to attend the Sami funeral of her younger sister. Christina, who locals call by her original Sami name, Elle-Marja, does not want to be there. She calls the Sami people thieves and liars, and is disturbed when people speak to her in her first language Southern Sami. She refuses to spend the night at her late sister's family home and would rather check into a hotel. In the evening Christina remembers her childhood and the events that drove her away from her community.

In the 1930s, 14-year-old Elle-Marja's mother is ill. Elle-Marja is sent with her younger sister Njenna to the nomad school, a boarding school for Sami children where a blonde teacher from Småland, Christina Lajler, teaches them Swedish and to know their place. Speaking Sami, even just among themselves outside of the classroom, results in beatings. Elle-Marja is one of the best students, with a perfect score on her exams and striving to perfect her Swedish. Her teacher encourages her interest in reading and gives her a book of poetry by Edith Södergran. Elle-Marja feels alienated from the other Sami children, and her feeling of alienation is intensified when scientists from the Statens institut för rasbiologi (State Institute for Racial Biology) in Uppsala come to the school to measure the children's heads and take photos of them naked, ignoring their questions about what is going on and disregarding their shame about having to undress in the presence of each other, the teacher and the neighbourhood boys who are allowed to watch through the windows.

After threatening a group of these boys with her father's old knife because they called her racist names and slurs, the boys nick the edge of Elle-Marja's ear like the Sami people do with reindeer. She changes out of her gaeptie and takes one of her teacher's dresses from a clothes line.

A group of young soldiers pass her on their way to a dance and Elle-Marja sneaks after them. For a couple of hours she gets to experience how it feels to have the respect of others and be treated with decency by them without question. She dances with a boy called Niklas, who lives in Uppsala, and Elle-Marja makes up her mind that she will leave Sápmi and go south to Uppsala to study. She tells Niklas that her name is Christina, and does not mention her ethnicity. However, her sister, who has told the school secretary about Elle-Marja's sneaking off, arrives with the secretary and Elle-Marja is forcibly removed from the dance and beaten with a switch.

Elle-Marja approaches her teacher and asks if she can get a written recommendation to continue her studies in Uppsala. The teacher informs Elle-Marja that she is 'bright' but that the Sami people lack the sort of intelligence needed for higher studies. She claims that she is needed in northern Sweden or her culture will die out, and Sami supposedly do not adapt well to urban settings. Hearing this, Elle-Marja decides to run away to Uppsala, steals some clothes from a woman on a train, and burns her gaeptie. She invites herself to stay with Niklas' family. After being reluctantly let into the home for a night and having had sex with Niklas, Niklas' parents ask Elle-Marja to leave, revealing to their son that they know their guest is Sami. Elle-Marja is then forced to sleep outside in the Botanical Garden.

Elle-Marja enrolls in school under the name Christina Lajler. Just as she is beginning to make new friends, she is billed for two semesters of schooling amounting to 200 Swedish krona. Elle-Marja goes back to Niklas' family home in order to borrow the money from him, only to find that Niklas is celebrating his birthday with a party. She is invited to join the party, where a group of university students begin chatting with her, revealing that they know she is Sami by way of Niklas' parents. They force her to joik for the party-goers. Humiliated, Elle-Marja leaves the party but is approached by Niklas, and she asks him for money. He grows tired of her lies, rebuffs her and is called back into the house by his mother.

Unable to pay for school, Elle-Marja is forced to take the train home. Elle-Marja returns to her family but is hostile to them for being Sami. She desires to sell her share of her reindeer in order to pay for her schooling, but her mother rejects this request and tells her daughter to leave. The next morning, Elle-Marja's mother wordlessly gives her daughter the money to continue her schooling in the form of a silver belt that once belonged to Elle-Marja's father.

In 2017, Christina utters an apology to her dead sister, Njenna, in South Sami.

== Background ==
During the twentieth century, Sámis were portrayed as savages through Swedish eyes in many film productions. At that time, Swedish society at large considered Sámis as being inferior, less intelligent, and unable to survive in a civilized city. On the one hand, they tried to assimilate the Sámi people, but on the other hand, they believed Sámis should be segregated and remain in their traditional way of life, as integrating with Swedes might make the Sámi culture go extinct. In the end, these conflicting goals still ended up emphasizing the difference between Swedes and Sámi.

According to Monica Kim Mecsei, the past decades have witnessed the change of the depiction of Sámi culture in cinema, from an outsider perspective to an insider one. Sami Blood is exactly the example. It focuses on the youth of a Sámi girl Elle Marja (the other) and narrates her story of becoming someone else. Facing racism, some choose to isolate themselves in their own culture, while some choose to get into the main majority. Elle-Marja and her sister Njenna are in the same situation, but they make completely different choices. Elle-Marja desires to pass herself off as a “normal Swede” while Njenna is proud of her Sámi blood, refusing to make any changes. They are two typical attitudes toward the new culture. To be isolated, or to be assimilated? Sami Blood doesn't make value judgments on the options, but just presents the phenomenon to the audience. Neither of them is wrong or right. Young indigenous people face a self-identity crisis which was, is, and can be a universal problem all over the world. The story depicts the self-identity crisis of one Sámi girl, but more than that, it also focused on the dilemma among Sámi people. Thus, Sami Blood is supposed to be an important part of Sámi cinema in Swedish film history.

According to Mescei, a certain Sámi iconography has been created since Sámi people first appeared on the screen in 1947. Sámis were associated with mountain highlands, hunting, gathering, reindeers, and nomadism. The Sámi people were represented with Sámi tents, turf huts, the colorful traditional costumes and skiers in snow-covered landscapes. This iconography was created to define Sámi culture in general and it was often used with an imperialistic and touristic view on Sámi culture. This reinforces a certain stereotype of the Sámi people. The Sámi people have stereotypically been portrayed as savages on the one hand who are barbaric and demonic in contrast to the Swedish or Norwegian people, on the other hand, they have been seen as the noble savages who live homogenously with nature, creating a romantic idea of Sámi identity. Sami Blood uses this Sámi iconography, not as a spectacle, but as an active part of the narrative. This is also an example of the inside perspective this film has on Sámi culture.

== Cast ==
- Lene Cecilia Sparrok – Elle-Marja (young)
- Maj-Doris Rimpi – Christina/Elle-Marja (old)
- Mia Sparrok – Njenna
- Julius Fleischanderl – Niklas
- Hanna Alström – Christina Lajler, teacher at the nomad school
- Olle Sarri – Olle
- Anne Biret Somby – Sanna
- Anders Berg – Scientist at the racial biology institute
- Katarina Blind – Anna, Elle-Marja's mother
- Beata Cavallin – Hedda
- Malin Crépin – Elise, Niklas' mother
- Ylva Gustafsson – Laevie
- Tom Kappfjell – Aajja
- Anna Sofie Bull Kuhmunen – Anna-Stina
- Andreas Kundler – Gustav

== Production ==
Sami Blood is the first feature fiction film to have received funding from the International Sámi Film Institute. Evolving out of a short made by Kernell that was screened at the 2015 Sundance Film Festival, the film was shot partly in Tärnaby-Hemavan, in northern Sweden, and partly in Uppsala and Stockholm.

Amanda Kernell, the director of Sami Blood, who has a Sami father and a Swedish mother, mentioned in an interview that although the film is about 1930’s Swedish society, she did not just want to make it a historical film which shows faked reality, but wanted it to be authentic and communicate real feelings. She cared a lot about every detail in producing it, such as shooting locations and casting. According to her interview, the girl who played Elle-Marja is a true Sami girl who does reindeer herding in her everyday life. Besides this, some stories in the film were based on real experiences she had had before, or real anecdotes she heard from her family and Sami people through interviews. By the use of her own identity and materials she could find, Amanda managed to represent the nuanced negative atmosphere flowing between the dominating and the dominated in 1930’s Swedish society.

== Reception ==
On review aggregator Rotten Tomatoes, the film holds an approval rating of 97%, based on 30 reviews with an average rating of 7.2/10.

=== Awards ===
Sami Blood won the top prize at the 2017 Göteborg Film Festival, the Dragon Award Best Nordic Film. A prize of one million Swedish kronor (approximately US$114,000), it is one of the world's largest film prizes. In addition, Sophia Olsson won the Sven Nykvist Cinematography Award for the film.

At the 57th Thessaloniki International Film Festival, the film won the Human Values Award.

At the Tokyo International Film Festival, Sami Blood won second prize in the juried competition, and Lene Cecilia Sparrok won the best actress award. Sparrok (a teenage reindeer herder in real life) gave her acceptance speech in Sami.

At the Venice Film Festival, the film played in the Venice Days section and won the Fedeora Award for Best Young Director and the Europa Cinemas Label (for best European film in Venice Days).

At the UK Film Festival, it won the Best Feature Film Award.

At the Santa Barbara International Film Festival, the film won the Valhalla Award for Best Nordic Film. On 14 November 2017, it won the Lux Prize.

== See also ==
- Sámi films
- Jeʹvida
