= Charter (film) =

2020 film

- Film poster
- Directed by: Amanda Kernell
- Starring: Ane Dahl Torp
- Release dates: 26 January 2020 (Sundance); 13 March 2020 (Sweden)
- Running time: 94 minutes
- Country: Sweden
- Language: Swedish

Charter is a 2020 Swedish drama film directed by Amanda Kernell. It was selected as the Swedish entry for the Best International Feature Film at the 93rd Academy Awards, but it did not make the shortlist.

== Plot ==
While awaiting on the final custody verdict following her divorce, a mother abducts her two children, taking them to Tenerife.

== Cast ==
- Ane Dahl Torp as Alice
- Sverrir Gudnason as Mattias
- Troy Lundkvist as Vincent
- Tintin Poggats Sarri as Elina
- Johan Bäckström as Simon
- Eva Melander as Margit
- Gabriel Guevara as Manuel

== Reception ==
=== Critical response ===
Charter has an approval rating of 100% on review aggregator website Rotten Tomatoes, based on 8 reviews, and an average rating of 8.7/10.

== See also ==
- List of submissions to the 93rd Academy Awards for Best International Feature Film
- List of Swedish submissions for the Academy Award for Best International Feature Film
