= Lene Cecilia Sparrok =

Southern Sámi actress and reindeer herder from Norway

- Born: 6 October 1997 (age 28); Namsskogan Municipality, Nord-Trøndelag, Norway
- Occupations: Actress; reindeer herder
- Years active: 2016–present

Lene Cecilia Sparrok (born 6 October 1997) is a Norwegian Southern Sámi actress and reindeer herder. She played the main character, Elle-Marja, in the Sami 2016 film Sami Blood, for which she won a Guldbagge Award for Best Actress in a Leading Role.

Sporrok was born on 6 October 1997 in Namsskogan Municipality, Norway. She grew up in a family connected to Southern Sámi culture and learned reindeer herding at a young age. She went to a boarding school in Hattfjelldal for a few years before moving to a school in Snåsa.

She speaks Southern Sámi, Norwegian and Swedish.

== Filmography ==
- 2016 - Sami Blood

== Theatre ==
- 2020 - Ædnan, a National Swedish Touring Theatre production of the epic with the same name.
- 2024 - Hearrát dat bidje min/Herrarna satte oss hit. An Uppsala stadsteater production based on Elin Anna Labba's book with the same title.
