= Swedish Film Academy =

Association that promotes film in Sweden

The Swedish Film Academy (Swedish: Svenska Filmakademin), formerly the Swedish Film Society (Svenska Filmsamfundet), is a Swedish association that promotes film in artistic, cultural, and technical terms. It is located in Stockholm, and awards the annual Kurt Linder Scholarship to young filmmakers who have made significant contributions to the Swedish film industry.

== History ==
Like the Swedish Film Institute, the origins of the Swedish Film Academy (Svenska Filmakademin) are in the Swedish Film Society (Svenska Filmsamfundet), which was established in October 1933 by filmmakers and writers Bengt Idestam-Almquist, Arne Bornebusch, Artur Lundkvist, Gustaf Molander, Per-Axel Branner, and others. Writer Eyvind Johnson was also a member.

The society created a film archive and museum, which later achieved independence as Filmhistoriska samlingarna, and was in 1964 donated to the newly-formed Swedish Film Institute.

The other activity of the society was organising and hosting debates and lectures, and awarding scholarships for filmmaking. In 1967, the Swedish Film Association transformed itself into the Swedish Film Academy, and continued these activities. Director Gösta Werner was the inaugural president of the new academy.

== Functions ==
The Swedish Film Academy continues to promote film in artistic, cultural, and technical terms.

== Governance and membership ==
The Swedish Film Academy is governed by a board comprising eight people, known as the Presidium. New members can be proposed by the Presidium, and need to be elected to the academy. As of 2024 the president is Bo-Erik Gyberg.

As of 2024 the academy has around 140 members, who pay an annual fee of 300 Swedish krona after being elected.

== Scholarships and other awards ==
=== Kurt Linder Scholarship ===
The academy has awarded the Kurt Linder Scholarship, also known as Kurt Linder Memorial Fund Grant, almost every year since 1969, when the inaugural scholarship was awarded to cinematographer Jörgen Persson. Kurt Linder (1912−1955) was chairman of the student film studio from 1939 to 1945, and later worked on a volunteer basis in the library of the Swedish Film Society. He also wrote articles, and was employed from 1938 until his death as advertising manager at Columbia Film AB in Stockholm.

Eligibility is limited to people under 35 who have made significant contributions to Swedish film. As of 2024 the scholarship is worth 20,000 krona.

=== Silver Plaquette ===
The Swedish Film Academy's Silver Plaquette (Svenska Filmakademins silverplakett) was awarded to filmmakers in some years between 1968 and 1994, when at least five were awarded. The award itself was a silver disc of 6 cm (2.4 in) diameter, featuring a naked man with a laurel in one hand, and embossed with the words "Svenska Filmakademin".
