= Andreas Kundler =

Swedish actor (born 1970)

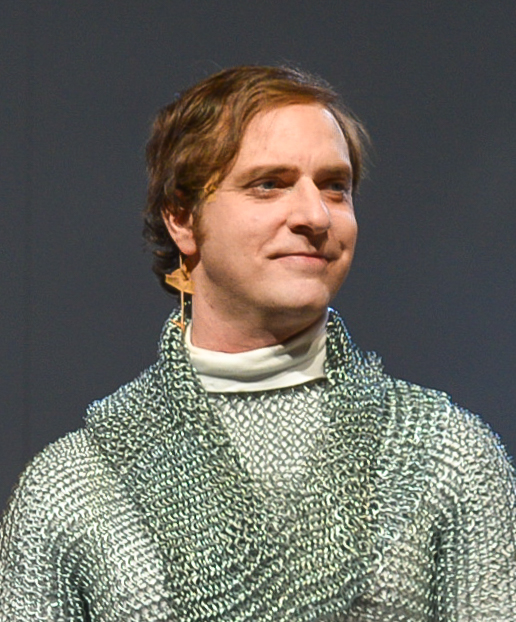
- Kundler in 2014
- Born: Jenö Carl Andreas Kundler; 10 December 1970 (age 55); Hässelby, Sweden
- Occupation: Actor
- Years active: 1997–present

Jenö Carl Andreas Kundler (born 10 December 1970) is a Swedish actor. He studied in Malmö 1994–97.

== Selected filmography ==
- Besvärliga människor (2001)
- Beck – Annonsmannen (2002)
- Berglunds begravningar (2003)
- Lasermannen (2005)
- Lögnens pris (2007)
- Sami Blood (2016)
