= Mia Benson =

Swedish actress and screenwriter

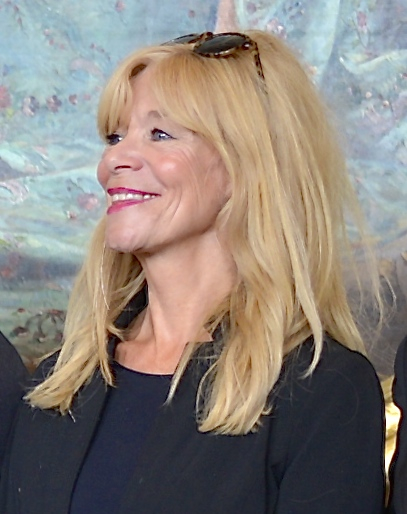
Mia Benson in 2014

Eva-Maria "Mia" Benson, (born 7 June 1947 in Söderort, Stockholm) is a Swedish actress and screenwriter. Benson studied at Skara skolscen between 1967 and 1968 and also studied in Stockholm between 1968 and 1971. After her studies she played in Proteatern, Nationalteatern in Gothenburg, Intiman and Chinateatern. Since 2012, she works at the Royal Dramatic Theatre.
