= Zlatan Ibrahimović =

Swedish footballer (born 1981)

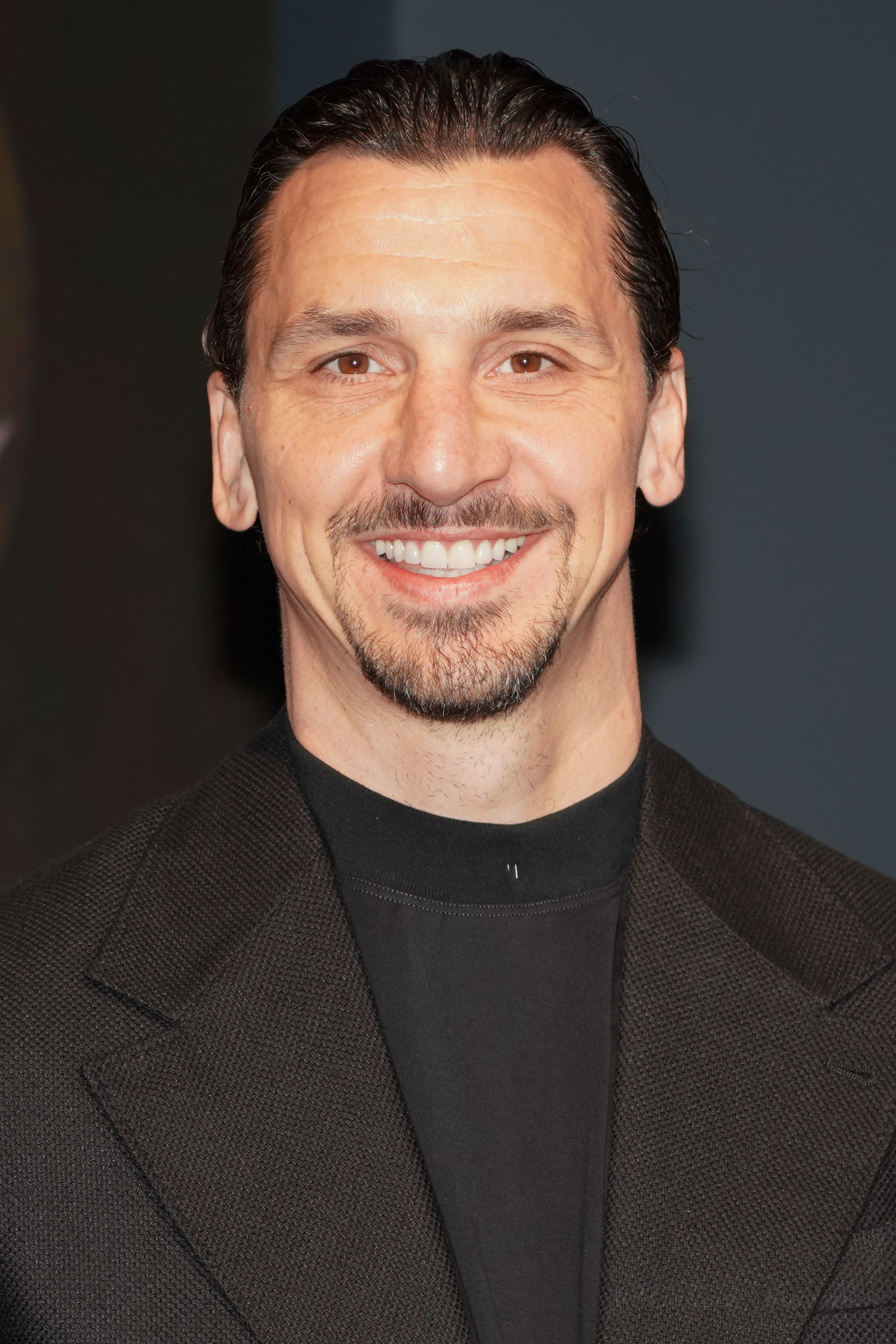
- Ibrahimović in 2026

Personal information
- Full name: Zlatan Ibrahimović
- Date of birth: 3 October 1981 (age 45)
- Place of birth: Malmö, Sweden
- Height: 1.95 m (6 ft 5 in)
- Position: Striker

Youth career
- 1989–1991: Malmö BI
- 1991–1995: FBK Balkan
- 1995–1999: Malmö FF

Senior career*
| Years | Team | Apps | (Gls) |
| 1999–2001 | Malmö FF | 40 | (16) |
| 2001–2004 | Ajax | 74 | (35) |
| 2004–2006 | Juventus | 70 | (23) |
| 2006–2009 | Inter Milan | 88 | (57) |
| 2009–2011 | Barcelona | 29 | (16) |
| 2010–2011 | → AC Milan (loan) | 29 | (14) |
| 2011–2012 | AC Milan | 32 | (28) |
| 2012–2016 | Paris Saint-Germain | 122 | (113) |
| 2016–2018 | Manchester United | 33 | (17) |
| 2018–2019 | LA Galaxy | 56 | (52) |
| 2019–2023 | AC Milan | 64 | (34) |
| Total | | 637 | (405) |

International career
| 1999 | Sweden U18 | 4 | (1) |
| 2001 | Sweden U21 | 7 | (6) |
| 2001–2023 (Note: He initially retired from the national team in 2016, but returned in 2021 and remained until his definitive retirement in 2023.) | Sweden | 122 | (62) |
- * Club domestic league appearances and goals

Zlatan Ibrahimović (born 3 October 1981) is a Swedish former professional footballer who played as a striker. He is known for his acrobatic strikes and volleys, technique, ball control, and physical dominance. Ibrahimović is regarded as one of the greatest strikers of all time and is one of the most decorated footballers in the world, having won 34 trophies in his career. He scored over 570 career goals, including more than 500 club goals, and scored in four consecutive decades between the 1990s and the 2020s.

Ibrahimović began his senior career with Malmö FF in 1999 before joining Ajax in 2001, where he won two Eredivisie titles. His emergence as a promising young player earned him a transfer to Italian club Juventus in 2004. In 2006, he joined Inter Milan, winning three consecutive Serie A titles, before making a high-profile move to Barcelona in 2009. He returned to Italy with AC Milan after a single season and won the Serie A title in his first season. In 2012, he joined French club Paris Saint-Germain, where he helped establish the club's domestic dominance, winning four consecutive Ligue 1 titles, finishing as the top scorer in Ligue 1 on three occasions, and becoming PSG's all-time leading goalscorer at the time of his departure. During Ibrahimović's time in Italy and France, he won the Serie A Footballer of the Year and the Ligue 1 Player of the Year three times each.

In 2016, Ibrahimović joined Manchester United on a free transfer, re-uniting with José Mourinho and winning the EFL Cup and UEFA Europa League in his first season. After recovering from a serious knee injury, Ibrahimović joined MLS club LA Galaxy in March 2018. In the United States, he earned multiple individual accolades and was frequently mentioned in media. In January 2020, he returned to AC Milan and played a key role in reviving the Italian club, winning his fifth Serie A title in 2022. He announced his retirement at the end of the 2022–23 season.

Ibrahimović is one of eleven players to have made 100 or more appearances for the Sweden national team, over a 20-year international career. He is the country's all-time leading goalscorer with 62 goals. He represented Sweden at the 2002 and 2006 FIFA World Cups, as well as the 2004, 2008, 2012, and 2016 UEFA European Championships. He has been awarded Guldbollen (the Golden Ball), given to the Swedish player of the year, a record 12 times, including 10 consecutive from 2007 to 2016. Ibrahimović's 35-yard bicycle kick goal for Sweden against England won the 2013 FIFA Puskás Award and is considered one of the best goals of all time. He has scored other memorable goals, most notably in the European Championships.

Ibrahimović was named in the FIFA FIFPro World XI in 2013 and the UEFA Team of the Year in 2007, 2009, 2013, and 2014. He finished at a peak of fourth for the FIFA Ballon d'Or in 2013. In 2015, UEFA included him as one of the best players that have not won the UEFA Champions League, while in 2019, FourFourTwo magazine named him the sixth-greatest player never to win the competition. In December 2014, Swedish newspaper Dagens Nyheter ranked him the second-greatest Swedish sportsperson ever, after tennis player Björn Borg. Off the field, Ibrahimović is known for his brash persona and outspoken comments, which often involve talking about himself in the third person. He has attained cult status among football fans, in equal parts due to his generational talent and charisma.

Including youth internationals, he has made 1,000 appearances in his career.

== Early life ==
I put up photos of Ronaldo in my room. Ronaldo was the man. He was what I wanted to be, a guy who made a difference. […] Ronaldo was my hero and I studied him online and tried to take in his movements, and I thought I was getting to be an awesome player.

— From his autobiography, I Am Zlatan Ibrahimović

Ibrahimović was born in Malmö, Sweden, on 3 October 1981. He was born to a Muslim Bosniak father, Šefik Ibrahimović, who emigrated to Sweden in 1977, and a Catholic Croat mother, Jurka Gravić, who also emigrated to Sweden where the couple first met. He began playing football at the age of six, after receiving a pair of football boots. He alternated between FBK Balkan, a Malmö club founded by Yugoslav immigrants, Malmö BI and briefly BK Flagg football clubs.

As a child, his mother sometimes hit him on the head with a wooden spoon, which would often break. After she was arrested for handling stolen goods, social services intervened. Concerned with his divorced mother's ability to cope with five children, one of whom, Ibrahimović's half-sister, had a drug problem, at age nine he was sent to live with his father. With food scarce at his father's home where the fridge was packed with beer, Ibrahimović often went hungry so he would run to his mother's for dinner. He also shoplifted and stole bikes. On the tough upbringing that shaped his character, author David Lagercrantz, who co-wrote I Am Zlatan, states:

Complex is the best word to describe Zlatan. On the one hand he's a strong, warrior type who knew he had to be very tough to survive. So he takes on fights all the time because he's always had to. But another part of him is vulnerable. He's a guy wounded by his upbringing, who uses all that to create strength for himself. In his position, 99 guys out of 100 would have gone under, but he used his anger to make himself better. He told me, 'David, I need to be angry to play well'. When he played with middle-class kids he felt inferior because he wore the wrong clothes and had no money, so he said to himself 'One day I'll show them!' That became his motivation.

While in his early teens, Ibrahimović was a regular for his hometown club Malmö FF. At the age of 15, he was close to giving up his football career in favour of working at the Port of Malmö, but his manager convinced him to continue playing. As a boy, his hero was Brazilian forward Ronaldo. An avid viewer of Italian football, another player he admired was prolific striker Gabriel Batistuta – a player with similar characteristics to himself.

== Club career ==
=== Malmö FF ===
Arsène Wenger asked me to have a trial with Arsenal when I was 17. I turned it down. Zlatan doesn't do auditions.

— Ibrahimović on turning down Arsenal

Ibrahimović signed his first contract with Malmö in 1996, and moved up to the senior side for the 1999 season of Allsvenskan, Sweden's top-flight league. That season, Malmö finished 13th in the league and were relegated to the second division, but returned to the top flight the next season. Arsène Wenger unsuccessfully tried to persuade Ibrahimović to join Arsenal, while Leo Beenhakker (the technical director of Ajax) also expressed interest in the player after watching him in a friendly against Norwegian side Moss FK. On 22 March 2001, a deal between Ajax and Malmö regarding Ibrahimović's transfer to Amsterdam was announced, and in July, Ibrahimović officially joined Ajax for 80 million Swedish kronor (€8.7 million).

=== Ajax ===
Ibrahimović received little playing time under manager Co Adriaanse, but when Adriaanse was sacked on 29 November 2001, new coach Ronald Koeman inserted Ibrahimović into the starting lineup as Ajax won the 2001–02 Eredivisie title. The next season, Ibrahimović scored twice in a 2–1 victory over French champions Lyon in his Champions League debut on 17 September 2002. He scored five Champions League goals overall as Ajax fell to Milan in the quarter-finals.

Ibrahimović's profile rose when he scored an individual goal against NAC Breda on 22 August 2004 – a slaloming run past five opposition players which the commentator compared with Diego Maradona and Zinedine Zidane – that was eventually voted the Goal of the Year by Eurosport viewers. On 18 August 2004, during an international match against the Netherlands, Ibrahimović injured Ajax teammate Rafael van der Vaart, who later accused Ibrahimović of hurting him intentionally.

=== Juventus ===
Ibrahimović moved from Ajax to Juventus for €16 million. He was promptly inserted into the starting eleven due in part to top scorer David Trezeguet's injury problems, and scored 16 goals. The club finished top of the Serie A, and in the Champions League they reached the quarter-finals before being knocked out by eventual champions Liverpool. Near the end of the season, Juventus reportedly rejected a €70 million bid for him from Real Madrid, which was later revealed to be a publicity stunt initiated by Ibrahimović's agent, Mino Raiola, in order to increase his market value. At the end of his first season in Italy Ibrahimović was named Serie A Foreign Footballer of the Year, and in November 2005, he was awarded the Guldbollen, a prize awarded to the best Swedish footballer of the year.

The following season was poor compared to his first season; his role in Juventus' attack changed, as he became less of a goalscorer and moved more to the sidelines, taking much part in the build-up play, especially as a target player, and his assist numbers increased. In the 2005–06 season, Juventus fans often got frustrated with him due to his anonymous presence in certain important games such as the Champions League defeat to Arsenal. Juventus were stripped of their last two Scudetti as part of the verdict from the Calciopoli scandal, and were relegated to Serie B. The new staff tried to persuade Ibrahimović and other top players to stay with Juventus, but the player and his agent were adamant to move on, with Raiola threatening legal action in order to extricate Ibrahimović from his contract.

=== Inter Milan ===
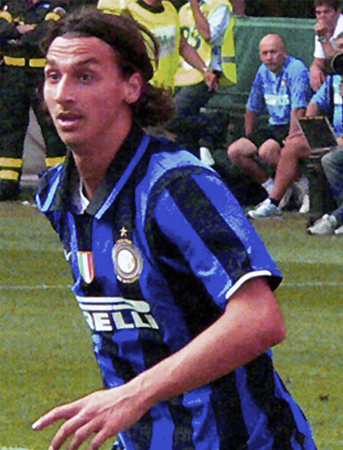
Ibrahimović playing for Inter Milan in 2007

On 10 August 2006, Ibrahimović completed a €24.8 million move to Inter Milan, signing a four-year deal. Ibrahimović said that he had supported Inter when he was young.

Ibrahimović made his debut for Inter on 26 August 2006 against Roma in the 2006 Supercoppa Italiana, playing the full 90 minutes as Inter won after extra time. He scored in his Serie A debut against Fiorentina on 9 September as Inter commenced the league with a 3–2 win at Stadio Artemio Franchi. Three days later, in his first Champions League appearance for Inter, Ibrahimović was not able to avoid the 1–0 away defeat to Sporting CP as Inter began their European campaign in the wrong way. Later, on 28 October, in his first "Derby della Madonnina" match against cross-town rivals Milan, Ibrahimović scored the third Inter goal of the match and also his third league goal of the season in a 4–3 thriller win. In his first season at the club, Ibrahimović top scored for Inter in Serie A with 15 goals, as the team won the Scudetto with a record 97 points.

Ibrahimović played his 100th Serie A match on 16 September 2007 at the San Siro against Catania, where he appeared as a second-half substitute for Hernán Crespo in an eventual 2–0 win. In 2007, he signed a new contract until June 2013; it was reported that this contract had made him the world's highest paid footballer. On 18 May 2008, Ibrahimović scored both goals in a 2–0 defeat of Parma on the final day of the 2007–08 Serie A season to give Inter a second consecutive Scudetto. Overall, he scored 17 goals in 26 league matches, and was named both Serie A Footballer of the Year and Serie A Foreign Footballer of the Year.

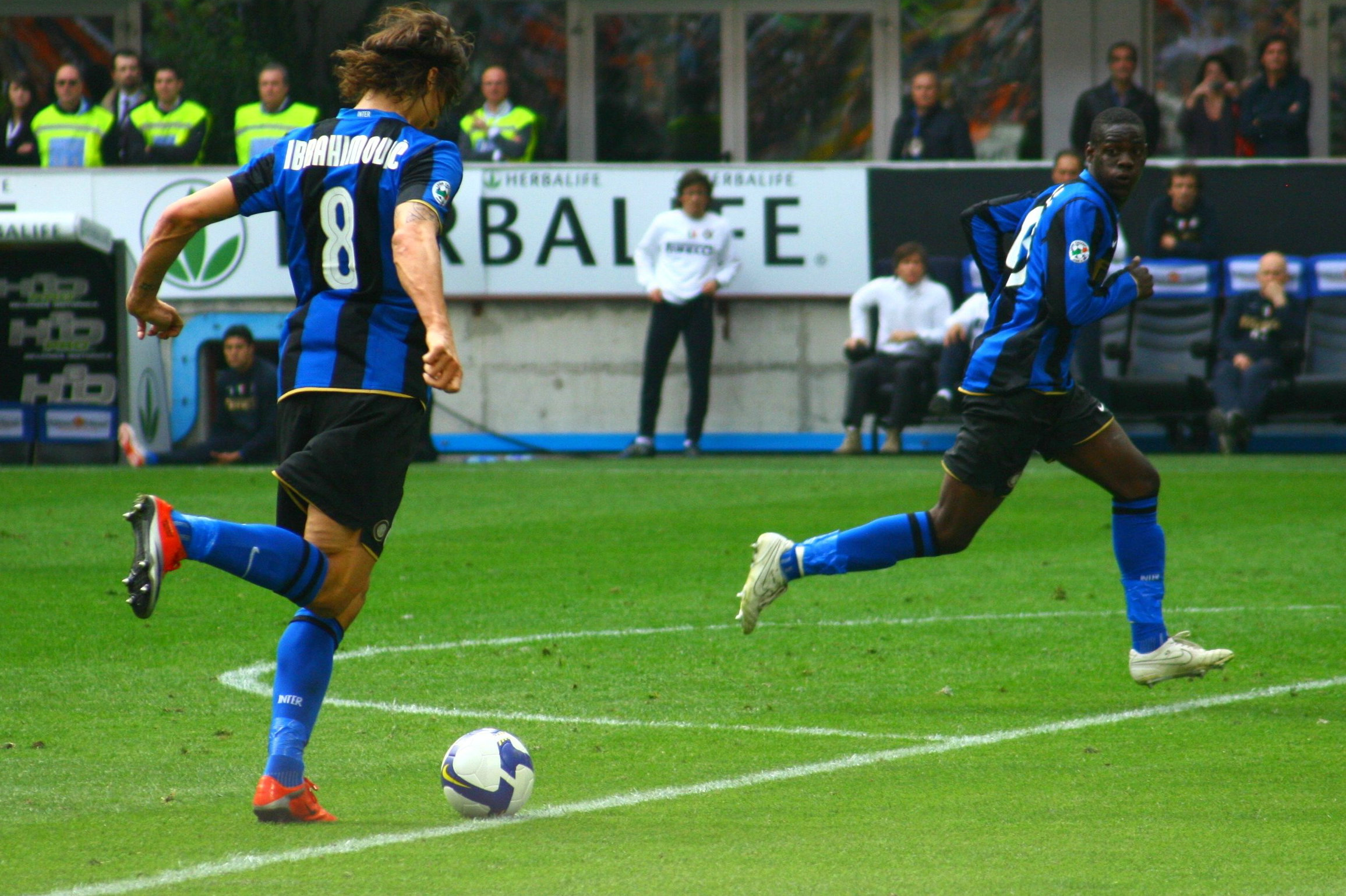
Ibrahimović and Mario Balotelli playing against Palermo in 2009

Ibrahimović started his third Inter season by winning the Supercoppa Italiana against Roma. After the regular and extra time had finished in a draw, the match went to a penalty shootout where he successfully converted his penalty attempt. He scored his team's only goal in the 2008–09 Serie A opening match against Sampdoria, which finished in a 1–1 draw. On 4 October, during the match against Bologna at home which Inter won 2–1, Ibrahimović scored a sensational goal, stunning Francesco Antonioli with an irresistible backheeled shot from Adriano's left-wing cross. The goal was later voted Goal of the Year in Serie A. On 19 October 2008, Ibrahimović continued with his solid performances by scoring twice in an impressive 4–0 win at Roma, taking his tally up to five league goals. He then scored another double in the Matchday 12 win against Palermo to help Inter take the lead in the Serie A table by one point. In the next fixture, Ibrahimović provided the assist on the only goal in the Derby d'Italia match against Juventus at home, helping Inter to extend their league lead.

Ibrahimović ended the 2008–09 Serie A season as the league's top goalscorer with 25 goals, helping Inter to another league title. He was also named both Footballer of the Year and Foreign Footballer of the Year for the second consecutive season.

=== Barcelona ===
==== 2009–10: La Liga title and relationship with Pep Guardiola ====
I was probably with the best team in history. Their football was beautiful. When I prepared for a game, I knew I had won even before we started. I looked at the players around me and saw Messi and Iniesta and Xavi and Puyol and Piqué and Dani Alves and Busquets. Unbelievable! It was football from another planet and I loved it. It was technically perfect.

— Interview, 6 October 2014

After Inter teammate Maxwell completed his transfer to Barcelona, Barça president Joan Laporta confirmed that there was an agreement in principle between Barcelona and Inter for Ibrahimović to join the club in exchange for striker Samuel Eto'o, plus a reported fee of £40 million. Ibrahimović left Inter during their United States summer tour in the World Football Challenge on 23 July 2009 for negotiations with Barcelona, with his last match for Inter being against Chelsea. After Inter agreed terms with Eto'o and Barcelona with Ibrahimović, Barcelona announced Ibrahimović would arrive on 26 July 2009 and undergo a medical test on 27 July 2009.

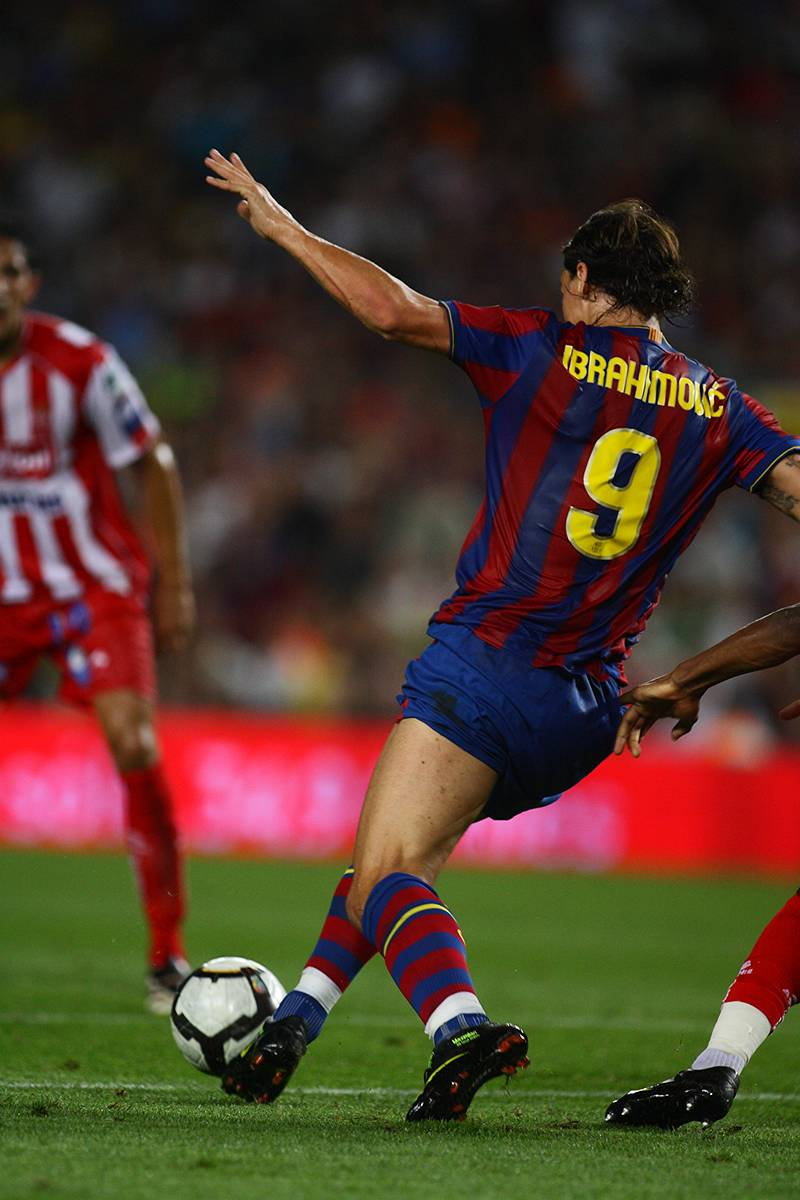
Ibrahimović playing for Barcelona in a match against Sporting Gijón in 2009

Ibrahimović passed his medical and was presented to a crowd of over 60,000 at Camp Nou. He signed a five-year contract, for €46 million and the exchange of Eto'o (valued at €20 million) and loan of Alexander Hleb (with an option to purchase for a €10 million fee), with a €250 million release clause, making Ibrahimović worth €66 million. The Hleb deal, however, collapsed. Eventually, Ibrahimović cost Barcelona €69.884 million, which included other fees. As per the Inter book, the fee was €69.5 million, but part of the Inter fee (max 5% according to FIFA regulation) were deducted and distributed by Barcelona to youth and young professional clubs of Ibrahimović: Malmö FF and AFC Ajax as solidarity contribution.

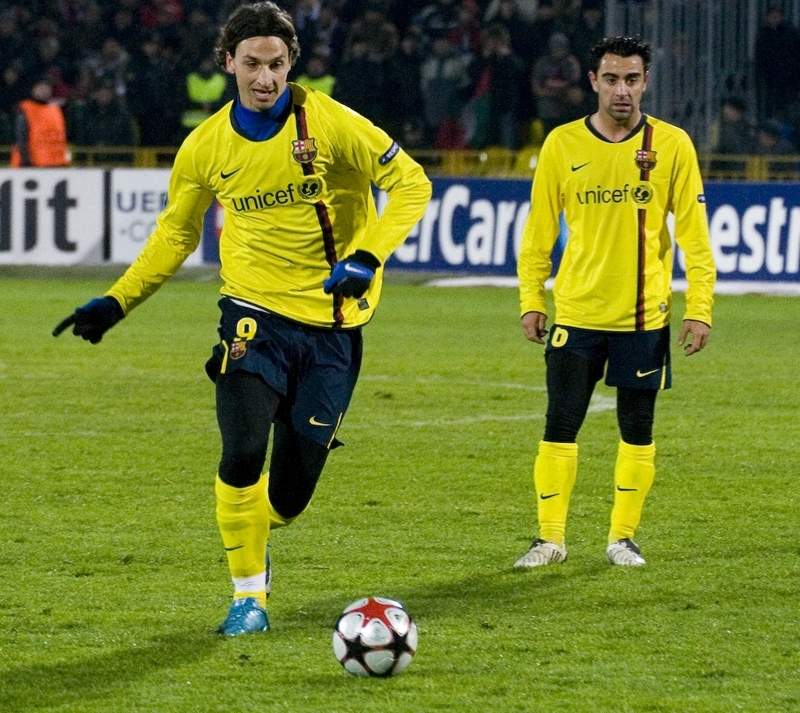
Ibrahimović preparing to strike a free kick for Barcelona in the UEFA Champions League with Xavi (right)

Ibrahimović started the 2009–10 season with his competitive debut for Barcelona on 23 August 2009 by assisting a Lionel Messi goal, leading them to the Supercopa de España, beating Athletic Bilbao 5–1 on aggregate. In his next competitive match, Barcelona won the 2009 UEFA Super Cup with a 1–0 win over Shakhtar Donetsk. In his third appearance, he scored his first goal in Barcelona's La Liga season opener against Sporting Gijón in a 3–0 win. Ibrahimović scored in his next four games, thus setting a team record by becoming the only player ever to score in his first five league matches.

On 20 October, he scored his first Champions League goal for Barcelona in a group stage match against Rubin Kazan. Five days later, he scored twice in a 6–1 thrashing of Real Zaragoza, giving him a league-leading seven goals in seven league matches while sending Barcelona to the top of the table. On 7 November, however, he suffered a thigh injury that kept him out for three weeks. He returned to action in week 12 of the season against Real Madrid as a second-half substitute for Thierry Henry, and scored his eighth goal of the campaign. He finished with 11 goals and 4 assists in Barcelona's first 15 league matches. Barcelona capped off 2009 by winning the 2009 FIFA Club World Cup against Estudiantes on 19 December 2009.

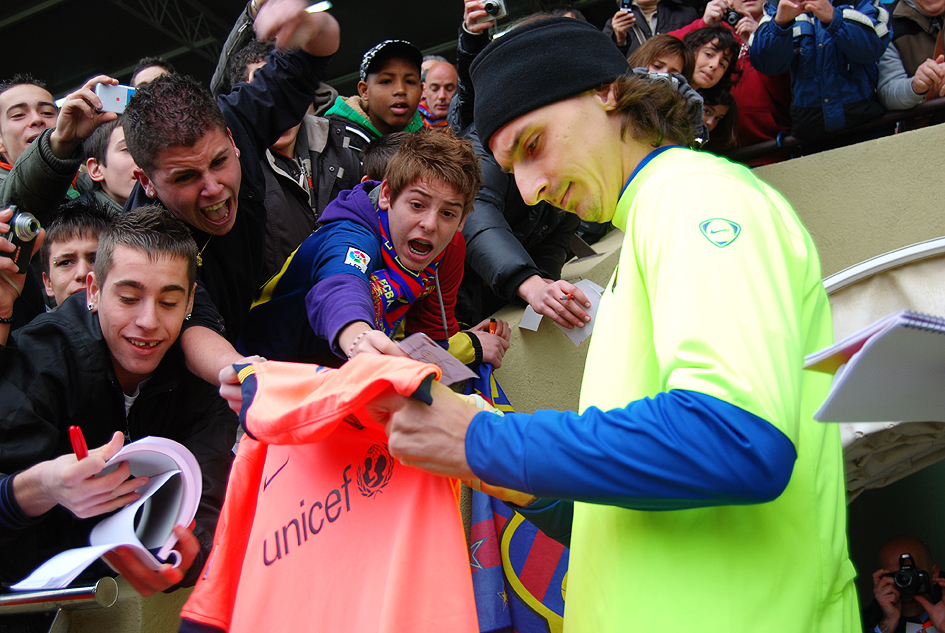
Ibrahimović signing autographs for fans in 2010

Ibrahimović scored Barcelona's only goal in the 2009–10 Copa del Rey first leg match of the round of 16 in a 2–1 loss to Sevilla on 5 January 2010. On 20 January, he was selected in the 2009 UEFA Team of the Year. His first goal of 2010 came on 14 February against Atlético Madrid. In his next appearance, Ibrahimović scored against Stuttgart in the first leg of their UEFA Champions League knockout stage fixture. He was sent off on 6 March in a league match against Almería, which Barcelona appealed to no avail, and he was suspended for one game. A calf strain during warmups before the next La Liga match following his return from suspension against Athletic Bilbao ruled Ibrahimović out of the second leg 4–1 victory over Arsenal, in which he scored two goals away from home, the return leg of El Clásico against Madrid (which Barcelona won 2–0), and the next league match against Deportivo de La Coruña. He made his return as a substitute in the 82nd minute in a 0–0 away draw against Espanyol on 17 April.

You bought a Ferrari, but you drive it like a Fiat.

— Ibrahimović disparages how he was used by Guardiola while at Barcelona.

Following Barcelona's semi-final defeat to Inter Milan in the Champions League, Ibrahimović spoke of how he confronted his coach Pep Guardiola in the changing room. "I yelled: 'You haven't got any balls!' and worse than that I added: 'You can go to hell!' I completely lost it, and you might have expected Guardiola to say a few words in response, but he's a spineless coward. He just [...] left, never to mention it again, not a word." He scored his final goal for Barcelona in the 2010 Supercopa de España on 14 August in a 3–1 defeat against Sevilla, and on 25 August, he played his last match for the club against Milan for the Joan Gamper Trophy, after which he claimed to the media that his relationship with Guardiola had started deteriorating and that Guardiola had not spoken to him since February. In his autobiography I Am Zlatan, he states, "'It started well but then Messi started to talk. He wanted to play in the middle, not on the wing, so the system changed from 4–3–3 to 4–5–1. I was sacrificed and no longer had the freedom on the pitch I need to succeed."

==== 2010–11: Loan to Milan ====
On 28 August 2010, AC Milan announced via their official website that they had signed Ibrahimović for the 2010–11 season. He was loaned out to Milan for the season, with the club having the option to purchase him outright for €24 million at the end of the season. He signed a four-year deal immediately after successfully passing the medical examinations. Upon signing, Ibrahimović said, "This move gives me more adrenaline. I have moved here to win the Champions League with Milan. I want to win the double."

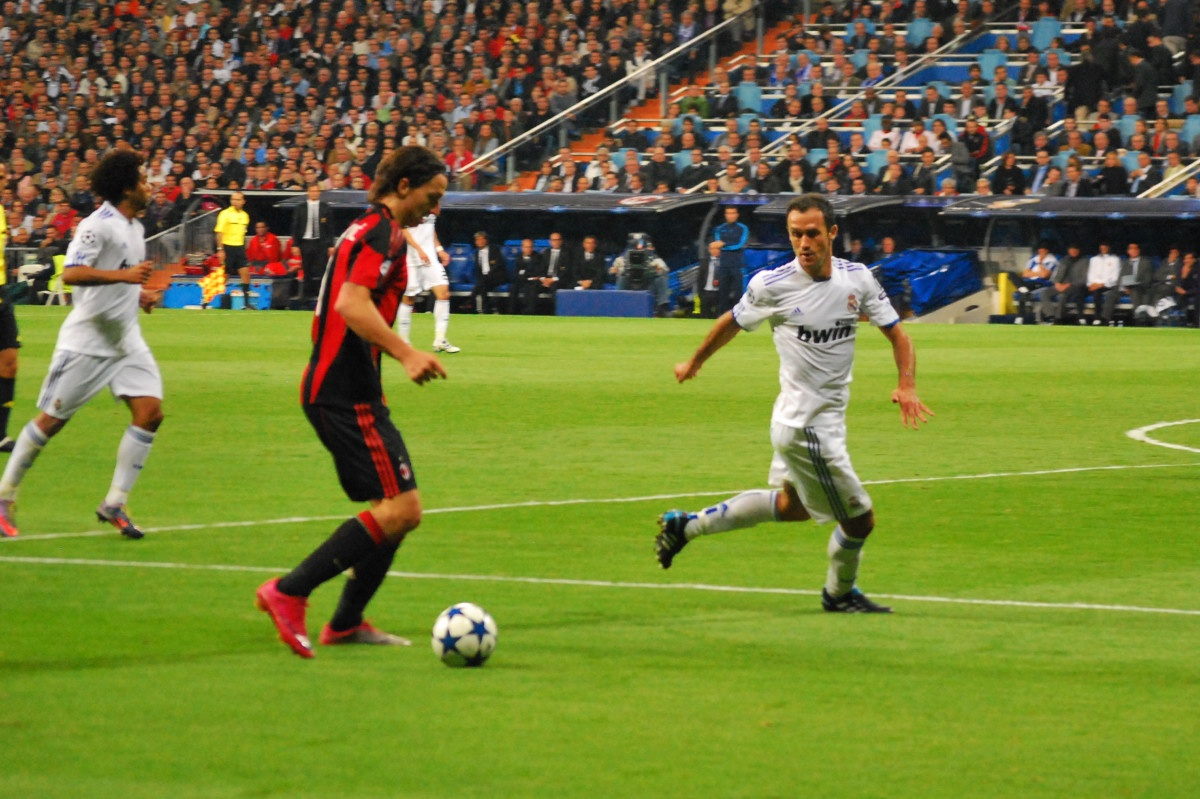
Ibrahimović on the ball for Milan in the 2010–11 UEFA Champions League

Ibrahimović made his Milan debut in a 2–0 loss to Cesena on 11 September, in which he missed a penalty late in the match, and scored his first goals for the club when Milan defeated Auxerre in their first Champions League match of the season on 15 September. On 14 November, Ibrahimović scored in a 1–0 victory against his former club Inter in the Derby della Madonnina. On 20 November, he scored his seventh goal against Fiorentina in the 45th minute with an over-the-head bicycle kick, passing Alexandre Pato as the team's top goalscorer for the season. On 4 December 2010, in a game against Brescia, he assisted Kevin-Prince Boateng to give Milan an early lead and then scored the third goal by a powerful shot near the edge of the penalty box to give Milan a 3–0 win. On 12 December 2010, history repeated itself in the game against Bologna after he assisted Boateng to give Milan an early lead once again and scoring later that match to make it 3–0, leading him to 13 goals with 8 assists in 21 matches in all competitions. Within days of the match, he was compared to Milan legend Marco van Basten by both the media and Van Basten himself.

Ibrahimović received a three-match ban after being shown a red card in a 1–1 home draw against Bari in March 2011 for punching Bari defender Marco Rossi in the stomach. An additional three-match ban was given to Ibrahimović in February 2012 in a 2–1 home defeat against Fiorentina for swearing at an assistant referee. Ibrahimović stated in his defence that he was talking to himself in frustration. He won his first Scudetto with Milan after a draw against Roma. All agreements between Milan and Barcelona were confirmed on 18 June 2011.

=== AC Milan ===
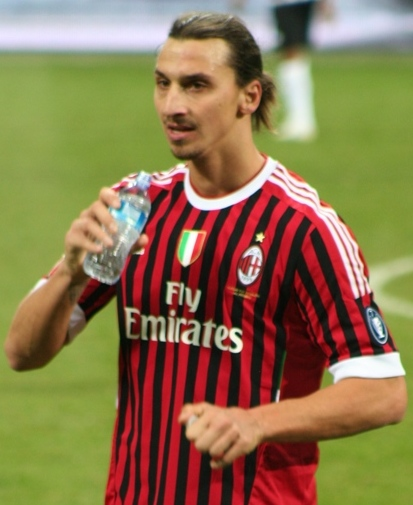
Ibrahimović during a Milan game in December 2011

Ibrahimović started the new season on 6 August in the 2011 Supercoppa Italiana against city rivals Inter, where he scored the first goal of a 2–1 comeback victory to clinch the first trophy of the season. In the opening league match of the 2011–12 season, Ibrahimović scored Milan's first goal of a 2–2 home draw against Lazio. He scored his first Champions League goal of the season on 28 September in a 2–0 home win against Viktoria Plzeň, which was followed by another one on 19 October against BATE Borisov in another 2–0 home win. He continued with his solid performances as he scored in a 4–1 home win against Parma and a brace in the team's 3–2 away victory over Roma, ending a successful month of October.

November saw him score in consecutive games against BATE, in the Champions League, and Catania, in the league. Later in the month against Barcelona in another Champions League tie, Ibrahimović scored against his old club to equalise the game at 1–1. Barça eventually pulled away however with Xavi scoring the winning goal to make it 3–2 at the San Siro. He ended November with a brace against Chievo, the first of those tallies brought his Serie A career total to 100 goals. In December, Ibrahimović scored a goal in each of five Serie A games. As 2012 started, he scored against Atalanta converting a penalty kick. He was the top goalscorer of Serie A, with 14 goals in 16 appearances following a brace against Novara, of which the second goal came from a backheel. On 5 February 2012 in a match against Napoli, he was shown a red card for slapping Salvatore Aronica in an off-the-ball incident, and was given yet another three-match ban from Serie A games.

On 15 February, in the first leg of the Champions League's round of 16, Ibrahimović set up both of Robinho's goals and also scored by a spot kick, thus helping Milan win 4–0 over Arsenal. On 3 March, during the 4–0 away win against Palermo, Ibrahimović took the lead of the goalscorers table as he scored a first-half hat-trick to take his tally up to 17 goals. He finished the season as Serie A top scorer with 28 goals in 32 matches.

=== Paris Saint-Germain ===
==== 2012–13: First Ligue 1 title in 19 years ====
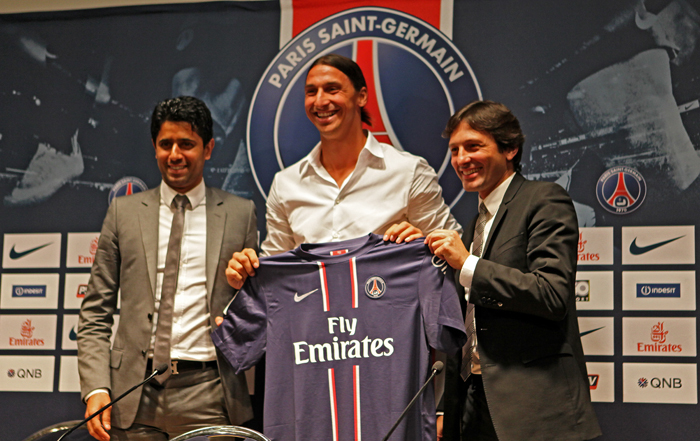
Ibrahimović unveiled by Paris Saint-Germain sporting director Leonardo Araújo (right) and President Nasser Al-Khelaifi (left)

On 17 July 2012, Paris Saint-Germain confirmed that they had reached an agreement to acquire the sporting and economic rights of Ibrahimović from Milan, having already agreed personal terms with the striker, for a transfer fee of €20 million. Valued at €180 million, these combined fees eclipsed those commanded by Nicolas Anelka. His three-year contract would see him receive a net annual salary of €14 million including bonuses (which would be €2 million more than what he was earning per year just before he left Milan), and make him the second best paid footballer in the world behind Samuel Eto'o.

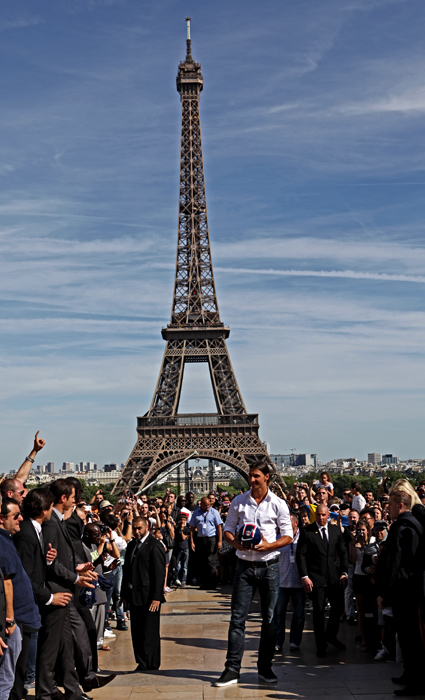
Ibrahimović greets PSG fans on the day he signed for the club in July 2012.

The following day, Ibrahimović signed the contract and made the following statement during the press conference: "It is a big step in my career and another dream come true. I am very happy because it is a project that I want to be involved in. I want to be part of the history of the club. I am here to win and nothing else." Ibrahimović scored twice in the second half for PSG to help them rally from 2–0 down at half-time to salvage a 2–2 home draw with Lorient in their opening 2012–13 Ligue 1 match. He scored two goals in the first half to help PSG to a 2–1 win over Lille which was PSG's first Ligue 1 win after three successive draws in the first three league matches of the 2012–13 season.

We haven't had a goalscorer like him in France for a long time. He is on a different planet to anyone else.

— Jean-Pierre Papin on Ibrahimović

In the opening 2012–13 Champions League Group A match against Dynamo Kyiv on 18 September 2012, Ibrahimović scored his sixth goal in only his fifth appearance for Carlo Ancelotti's side through a penalty. He thus became the first man to score for six clubs in the UEFA Champions League. On 8 October, Ibrahimović became only the third player (after Ronaldinho and Laurent Blanc) to have played in El Clásico in Spain, the Derby della Madonnina in Italy and Le Classique, the derby between Marseille and PSG. He scored both of PSG's goals (the first goal was from a backheel and the second was from a free kick) in the Ligue 1 Classique derby at the Stade Vélodrome on that day, with the match finishing 2–2. On 11 December 2012, he scored a hat-trick in a 4–0 away win against Valenciennes.

In January 2013, Ibrahimović was handed the number 10 jersey after the departure of Brazilian winger Nenê. In April 2013, Ibrahimović scored in a 2–2 draw against his former club Barcelona in the quarter-finals of the Champions League. PSG, however, were knocked out on away goals after drawing 1–1 at Camp Nou in the second leg. He ended the season as the assists leader in the 2012–13 Champions League, providing seven assists. On 12 May 2013, Paris Saint-Germain won the Ligue 1 title after a 1–0 away win against Lyon, their third title and first since 1994. He ended the year as Ligue 1's top goalscorer with 30 goals, becoming the first player to reach that mark in the French top flight since Jean-Pierre Papin in the 1989–90 season. On 20 May, he was named as Ligue 1's Player of the Year by the Union nationale des footballeurs professionnels (UNFP).

==== 2013–14: Back-to-back league top goalscorer and second Ligue 1 title ====
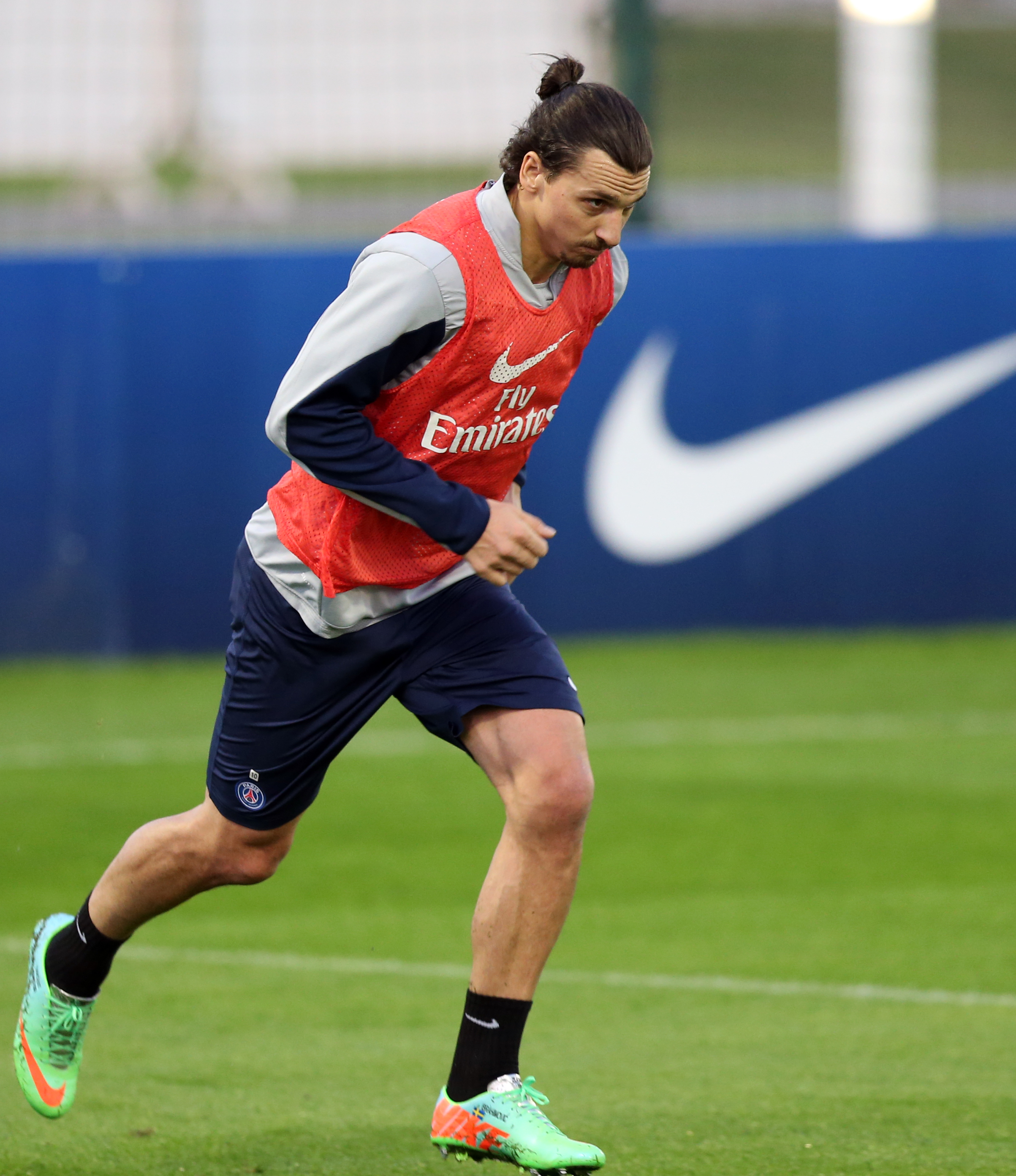
Ibrahimović training with Paris Saint-Germain in 2013

Ibrahimović netted his first goal of the season on 31 August 2013, scoring deep into stoppage time as PSG recorded a 2–0 victory over Guingamp. On 24 September, it was announced that Ibrahimović had extended his contract with PSG, which would see him stay at the club until 2016. A week later on 2 October, the Swede scored twice as PSG ran out 3–0 winners over Benfica in a Champions League group match. On 19 October, he scored two goals in PSG's 4–0 win over Bastia, one an audacious volleyed back heel as he reached behind the defender to fire the ball into the net. The goal was later named as Ligue 1's Goal of the Season, as chosen by the public. Four days later, Ibrahimović scored four goals in PSG's 5–0 away win against RSC Anderlecht in the Champions League; he scored the eighth-fastest hat-trick in the competition's history (completed in 19 minutes which included a bending 30-yard half-volley clocked at 93 miles per hour), and became the 11th player to score four times or more in a Champions League match.

On 27 November, Ibrahimović made his 100th UEFA Champions League appearance, scoring the opening goal in a 2–1 win over Olympiacos at the Parc des Princes. On 16 March 2014, Ibrahimović scored both goals in a 2–0 win over Saint-Étienne to surpass Carlos Bianchi's club record of 39 goals in a season. On 11 May, he was named Ligue 1's Player of the Year for the second consecutive season. Ibrahimović ended the Ligue 1 season as top scorer with 26 goals as PSG won a second consecutive league title. Overall, he scored 41 goals in all competitions, including ten in eight Champions League matches.

==== 2014–15: Domestic quadruple and all-time second top scorer ====
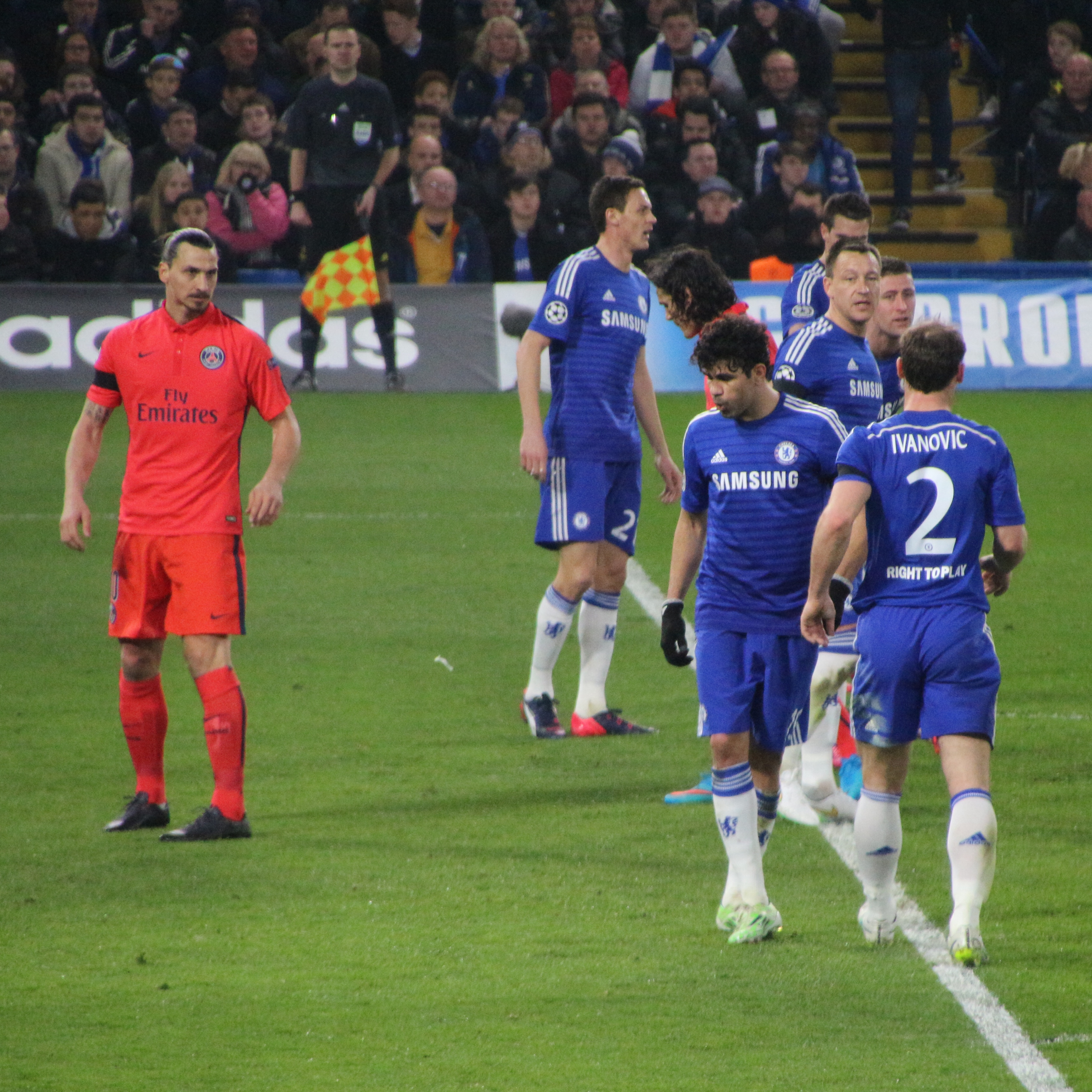
Ibrahimović (left) during a UEFA Champions League quarter-final against Chelsea in March 2015

Ibrahimović scored his first two goals for Paris Saint Germain on 2 August 2014 against Guingamp in the 2014 Trophée des Champions, winning his first silverware of the season. In the first league match of the season, Ibrahimović scored twice but also missed an open net and had a penalty saved as PSG drew 2–2 with Reims. Ibrahimović scored his first league hat-trick of the season in a match against Saint-Étienne on 31 August. In the quarter-finals of the Coupe de la Ligue on 13 January 2015, Ibrahimović scored the only goal to win away at Saint-Étienne. The home team argued that the ball had not crossed the line, and fans threw objects onto the pitch, disrupting play for ten minutes.

On 11 March, Ibrahimović received a straight red card in a Champions League round of 16 match against Chelsea at Stamford Bridge, for a foul on Oscar. PSG drew 2–2 after extra time to qualify for the quarter-finals on away goals. Nine days later, he scored a hat-trick in a 3–0 win over Lorient at the Parc des Princes. He netted another hat-trick on 8 April as PSG reached the 2015 Coupe de France Final with a 4–1 win over Saint-Étienne, starting with a penalty for his 100th goal for the club. He ended the match with 102 career goals for PSG, second only to Pauleta. Three days later, he scored twice as PSG defeated Bastia 4–0 in the 2015 Coupe de la Ligue Final. The first goal was a penalty which he won when fouled by Sébastien Squillaci, resulting in the Bastia defender's dismissal.

==== 2015–16: Departure and all-time PSG top goalscorer ====
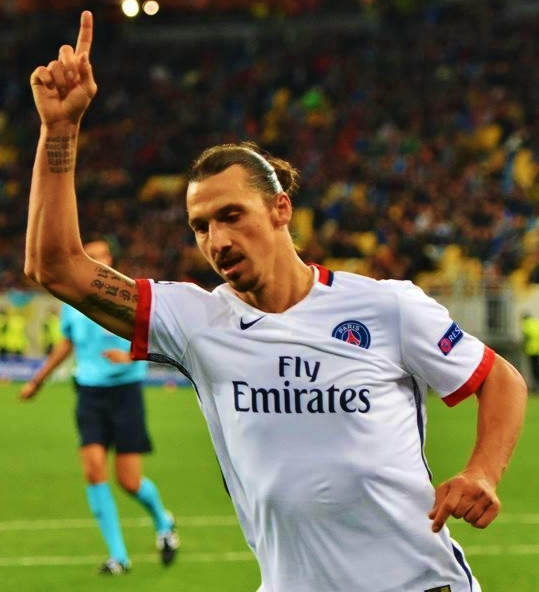
Ibrahimović playing against Shakhtar Donetsk in the group stage of the UEFA Champions League in September 2015

On 4 October 2015, Ibrahimović scored both goals from penalty kicks in a 2–1 home win over Marseille to overtake Pauleta and become Paris Saint-Germain's all-time leading goalscorer with 110 goals in all official competitions. On 25 November, Ibrahimović captained PSG on his return to hometown club Malmö FF in the group stage of the 2015–16 Champions League. He scored the team's third goal in a 5–0 win, a result that confirmed PSG's qualification to the knockout stage of the competition. In scoring twice in PSG's 3–0 win over Nice on 4 December 2015, Ibrahimović beat Mustapha Dahleb's previous record of 85 goals to become the club's all-time top goalscorer in the French first division. On 16 February 2016, in the 2015–16 UEFA Champions League round of 16 first leg against Chelsea at home, Ibrahimović scored the opener in the 39th minute with a free kick to help his team win 2–1. This was Ibrahimović's 116th appearance in the Champions League, meaning that he overtook Carles Puyol to enter the competition's all-time top ten appearance makers. Four days later, Ibrahimović netted twice during the 4–1 home win over Reims, taking his tally up to 23 league goals; he also set up the goals of Edinson Cavani and Gregory van der Wiel.

On 9 March, in the second leg of PSG's Champions League tie with Chelsea at Stamford Bridge, Ibrahimović assisted a goal for Adrien Rabiot and scored the winning goal himself as Paris won the match 2–1 and progressed to the quarter-final stage with a 4–2 aggregate victory. With this goal, he became the 14th player to score 50 or more goals in UEFA club competitions. Four days later, he scored four times in a 9–0 win against bottom-placed Troyes that sealed PSG's league title with eight games remaining; his hat-trick goal was his 100th in the league. His nine-minute hat-trick was the fastest in Ligue 1 history. Later that day, he announced he would be leaving PSG at the end of the season, while joking that only if they replaced the Eiffel Tower with a statue of himself would he stay. On 16 April, Ibrahimović scored twice in a 6–0 home win against Caen to earn him a season-best 32 goals in league; it was also his 41st goal of the season, equaling his season-best in 2013–14 season with two games less playing. Three days later, he netted the winner in the 2015–16 Coupe de France semi-final match away against Lorient to send Paris into the final for the second consecutive season; it was also his 42nd goal of the season, setting a new personal best. On 8 May 2016, Ibrahimović was named UNFP Ligue 1 Player of the Season for the third consecutive year.

Ibrahimović made his final Ligue 1 appearance for PSG against Nantes at the Parc des Princes on 14 May 2016, scoring twice in a 4–0 victory to become Paris Saint-Germain's top scorer in a single Ligue 1 season with 38 goals, which put him one goal ahead of Carlos Bianchi, who managed 37 in the 1977–78 campaign. Ibrahimović ended the 2015–16 Ligue 1 season as its top scorer, the third time that he had done so. The league match was stopped briefly in the tenth minute as fans gave Ibrahimović – whose PSG shirt was number 10 – a standing ovation. He was also cheered just before the final whistle, holding his two sons in his arms. They had run onto the pitch moments earlier, wearing number 10 PSG shirts with either the word "King" or "Legend" written in English on the back. The names were in reference to their father's "I came like a king, left like a legend" post on social media before the match. On 21 May 2016, Ibrahimović scored twice (his 155th and 156th goals in his 180th and final competitive match for the club) in the second half of the 2016 Coupe de France Final, and also set up Edinson Cavani's goal. PSG defeated Marseille 4–2 in that match. He was substituted to a standing ovation in the final minutes of the match. PSG thus won the Ligue 1-Coupe de France-Coupe de la Ligue domestic treble for the second consecutive season, and equalled Marseille's all-time record of ten Coupe de France titles. His record as PSG's all-time top scorer was surpassed by his former strike partner Cavani in January 2018.

=== Manchester United ===
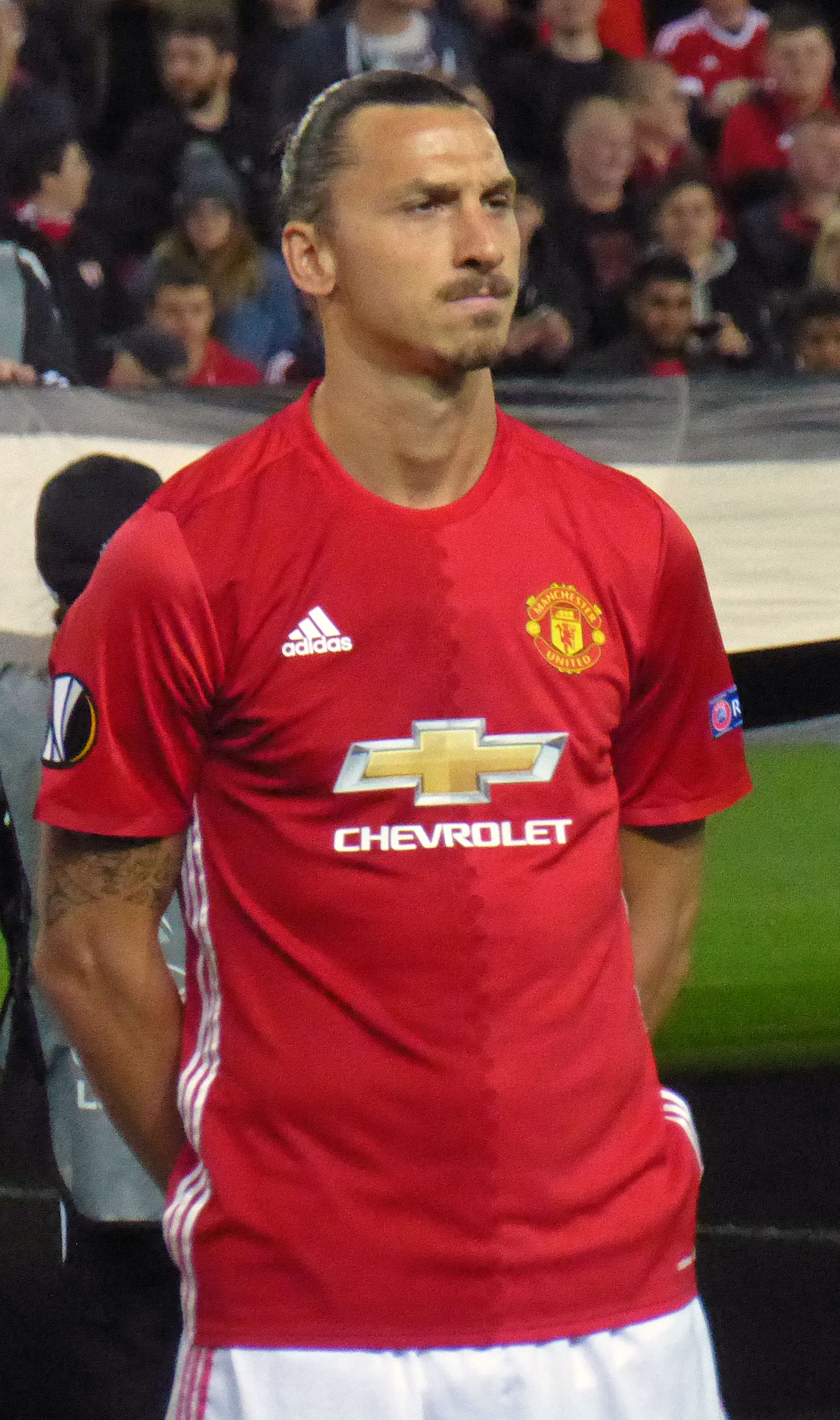
Ibrahimović prior to a Europa League game at Old Trafford in September 2016

On 1 July 2016, Ibrahimović signed as a free agent for Manchester United on a one-year contract, which had the option of being extended depending on his performance for the club. Ibrahimović stated that the chance to test himself in England and a reunion with José Mourinho convinced him to sign for the club. His salary was reported to be £200,000 per week.

==== 2016–17: Europa League and League Cup double ====
Ibrahimović was handed the number 9 jersey ahead of the 2016–17 season. On 7 August, Ibrahimović scored the match-winning goal for Manchester United in the 2016 FA Community Shield, rising above Wes Morgan to head past Leicester City goalkeeper Kasper Schmeichel in a 2–1 victory. This was his record 10th domestic super cup, won in a fifth country. In his Premier League debut one week later, he scored with a long-range strike in the 3–1 away win at AFC Bournemouth on the opening day. On 20 August, he scored both goals; a header in the first half and a penalty in the second, to beat Southampton 2–0 on his home debut. On 6 November, he scored twice in a 3–1 away win against Swansea City; his first was the 25,000th goal in Premier League history. He was later booked, picking up his fifth yellow card of the season, ruling him out of the league game at home against Arsenal on 19 November. On 5 February 2017, Ibrahimović scored his 15th league goal of the season and 20th in all competitions in a 3–0 away win against Leicester City, becoming the oldest player to manage at least 15 goals in a single Premier League season at the age of 35 years and 125 days.

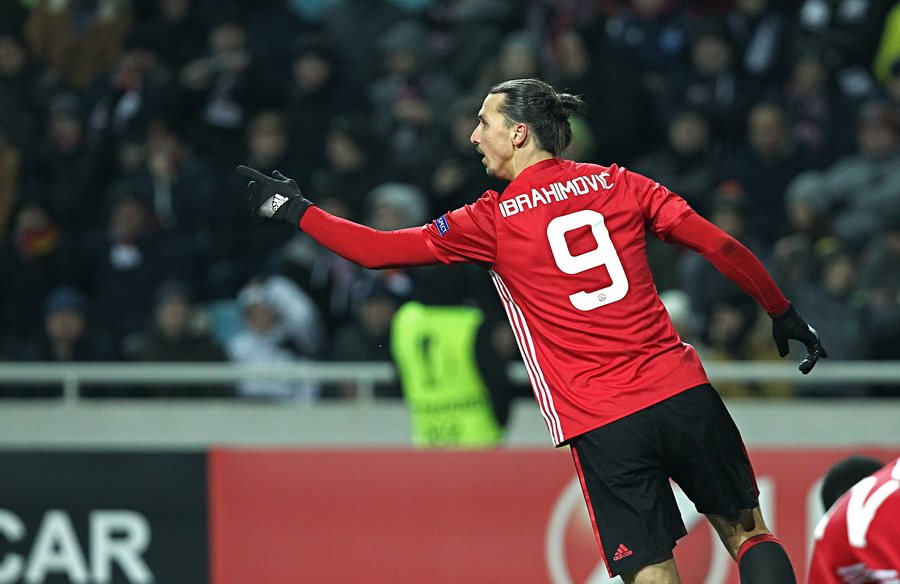
Ibrahimović celebrates after scoring for Manchester United against Zorya Luhansk in a UEFA Europa League group stage match in December 2016

On 16 February, Ibrahimović registered his first Manchester United hat-trick in a 3–0 win over Saint-Étienne in the Europa League Round of 32. On 19 February, he made his first FA Cup appearance, coming on as a 62nd-minute substitute and scoring the winner in a 2–1 fifth round win against Blackburn Rovers at Ewood Park. Exactly a week after his FA Cup debut, Ibrahimović scored two goals, a free-kick and a header (the winning goal), in the 2017 EFL Cup Final to clinch United's fifth League Cup and to win his second trophy with the club. On 7 March, Ibrahimović was suspended for three matches by The Football Association for violent conduct after elbowing Bournemouth's Tyrone Mings in a 1–1 draw at Old Trafford three days earlier. Later on 13 April, Ibrahimović was included in the six player shortlist for the PFA Player of the Year.

On 20 April, Ibrahimović sustained serious ligament damage in his right knee in a Europa League quarter-final against Anderlecht at Old Trafford. Several sources reported that the injury would sideline the player until at least the end of the 2016–17 season. Ibrahimović won his first major European title when Manchester United defeated Ajax in the Europa League Final at the Friends Arena in Stockholm, before being named in the UEFA Europa League squad of the season. At the end of the season, it was announced that Manchester United would release Ibrahimović at the end of his contract on 30 June 2017, although they later confirmed that they were in talks with Ibrahimović to re-sign him for the latter half of the 2017–18 Premier League season.

==== 2017–18: Final season in Manchester ====
On 24 August 2017, it was announced that Ibrahimović had signed a new one-year contract with Manchester United. It was also announced that he would be wearing the number 10 in his second season. Ibrahimović made his return for the club on 18 November, replacing Anthony Martial as a substitute in a 4–1 home win against Newcastle United. The following week, he became the first ever player to feature for seven clubs in the Champions League when he came on as a substitute in a 1–0 loss to Basel. In his first start of the season on 20 December, Ibrahimović his first goal of the season came via a free-kick in a 2–1 loss against Bristol City in the EFL Cup quarter-finals. On 22 March 2018, Manchester United announced that Ibrahimović had agreed to terminate his contract. Competition from new signing Romelu Lukaku and his fitness struggles factored in the decision to part ways in 2017.

=== LA Galaxy ===
On 23 March 2018, Ibrahimović signed for Major League Soccer (MLS) club LA Galaxy. He announced his arrival by taking out a signed full-page advertisement in the Los Angeles Times that simply said, "Dear Los Angeles, you're welcome".

==== 2018 season ====
He made his debut on 31 March as a substitute against Los Angeles FC in the inaugural El Tráfico derby, where he scored twice, including a 45-yard (41 m) half volley and a header in stoppage time, helping the Galaxy come from three goals down to win the match 4–3. After his match-winning performance, Ibrahimović said, "I heard the crowd saying 'We want Zlatan, we want Zlatan', so I gave them Zlatan." He scored twice for the Galaxy in a 3–2 defeat to FC Dallas on 30 May; he railed against his team after the match, saying "Every game we shouldn't be losing two or three goals and then you have to catch the game and try to win. This is not the game; this is absolutely not the game. Even if you are in MLS or Premier League, wherever, it doesn't work like that. We need to be the leading team and play from there, not to catch the goal all the time, so obviously it's not good."

Ibrahimović scored a penalty in a 4–0 win against the Columbus Crew on 8 July. He scored his 12th league goal of the season against the Philadelphia Union in a 3–1 victory on 21 July. Ibrahimović scored his first MLS hat-trick the following week in a 4–3 win against Orlando City, with his three goals inside 24 second-half minutes helping the Galaxy overcome a 1–2 deficit. On 15 September, Ibrahimović scored his 500th professional career goal for club and country with another acrobatic strike in a 5–3 away defeat against Toronto FC. Post match, Ibrahimović stated he was "happy for Toronto because they'll be remembered as my 500th victim". The goal was nominated in August 2019 for the 2019 FIFA Puskás Award for Goal of the Year. In his first year, despite the Galaxy missing out on the playoffs, Ibrahimović managed to be selected for the MLS All-Star Game and the MLS Best XI, as well as being awarded the MLS Newcomer of the Year Award and MLS Goal of the Year for his strike from distance against Los Angeles FC.

==== 2019 season ====
Ibrahimović playing for LA Galaxy in 2019

Ibrahimović was named team captain ahead of the 2019 season. On 2 March 2019, he scored in the Galaxy's opening match in a 2–1 win over the Chicago Fire. On 31 March, in his second appearance of the season, Ibrahimović scored two goals from the penalty spot, including one Panenka-style, in a 2–1 home win over the Portland Timbers. With this he reached 515 career goals, overtaking fellow countryman Gunnar Nordahl to become the Swedish player with the most goals in football history. On 20 July, Ibrahimović scored a perfect hat-trick against Los Angeles FC to win the match 3–2. This performance followed a debate on whether Ibrahimović was the best player in MLS compared to Los Angeles FC rival Carlos Vela, with Ibrahimović claiming himself the "best by far". Ibrahimović scored a second hat-trick of the season on 15 September, in a 7–2 win against Sporting Kansas City. This brought his tally for 2019 to 26 goals, breaking the club record for most goals scored in a single regular season. Ibrahimović was again named both an MLS All-Star and to the Best XI for a second consecutive season.

Ibrahimović managed to lead the LA Galaxy to the 2019 MLS Cup Playoffs, where on 24 October, despite recording a goal and an assist, his side were eliminated in the Western Conference Semifinals, following a 5–3 away defeat against Los Angeles FC. On 13 November 2019, Ibrahimović announced he was to leave the LA Galaxy through his Twitter account, telling Galaxy fans "[Y]ou wanted Zlatan, I gave you Zlatan. You are welcome. The story continues...Now go back to watch baseball".

=== Return to AC Milan ===
==== 2019–20: Return season ====
On 27 December 2019, Ibrahimović returned to AC Milan on a free transfer on a six-month contract until the end of the season, with an option to extend his contract until the end of the 2020–21 season, subject to certain conditions. Upon his return to the Rossoneri, he quickly established himself as the team leader and role model, especially for the younger players. He made his first appearance since his return to the club on 6 January 2020, coming on as a substitute in a 0–0 Serie A home draw against Sampdoria at the San Siro. Ibrahimović scored his first goal for Milan since returning on 11 January, in a 2–0 away win against Cagliari. The landmark goal saw him score in each of the last four decades (1990s, 2000s, 2010s, 2020s). On 9 February, he assisted a goal and subsequently scored another for Milan in their eventual 4–2 loss against rivals Inter; as a result, he became the oldest goalscorer ever in the Derby della Madonnina at the age of 38 years and 129 days, breaking the previous record set by compatriot Nils Liedholm (aged 38 years and 43 days).

Ibrahimović made his 100th appearance for the club (including his previous stint) on 15 July 2020, in a 3–1 home league win over Parma. He became the first ever player to score 50 Serie A goals for both Milan clubs on 29 July, with a brace in a win over Sampdoria. On 1 August, Ibrahimović scored a goal in a 3–0 win over Cagliari, becoming the oldest player to score at least ten goals in a Serie A season since Silvio Piola with Novara in the 1950s, at the age of 38 years and 302 days. On 31 August 2020, Ibrahimović extended his contract until the summer of 2021.

==== 2020–21: Serie A runner-up and return to Champions League ====
On 17 September 2020, Ibrahimović scored Milan's first goal of the 2020–21 season in a 2–0 away win over Shamrock Rovers in the second qualifying round of the Europa League. Four days later, he scored a brace in Milan's opening match of the Serie A season, a 2–0 home win over Bologna. After missing three games recovering from COVID-19, Ibrahimović returned in the Derby della Madonnina on 17 October, scoring twice in three minutes as Milan defeated Inter 2–1. He scored his third consecutive brace in the league in a 3–3 home draw to Roma on 26 October. On 22 November, Ibrahimović again scored twice in a 3–1 away win over Napoli, which was also his eighth consecutive league appearance with at least one goal. However, he also suffered a hamstring injury and had to be substituted.

Ibrahimović made his return to the side from injury on 9 January 2021, being brought on for the final five minutes of Milan's 2–0 win against Torino. On 18 January, he scored both of his side's goals in their 2–0 victory over Cagliari, ensuring Milan would stay three points clear at the top of the league table. Ibrahimović's goals meant that he had managed to score in each of his last nine starts for the club. On 26 January, he was involved in a confrontation with former Manchester United teammate Romelu Lukaku in Milan's Coppa Italia quarter-final match against Inter. Following a foul committed by Lukaku late in the first half, he and Ibrahimović exchanged insults as the pair clashed heads and had to be restrained by their respective teammates. Both players were booked as their arguments continued into the tunnel at half-time. Ibrahimović would be sent off during the second half following a second yellow for a foul on Aleksandar Kolarov, as Inter went on to record a 2–1 victory. Ibrahimović faced backlash after the match for his statements made in the confrontation, including when pitchside microphones picked up him telling Lukaku to "go do your voodoo" and calling him a "little donkey", with an investigation by the Italian Football Federation to determine if the statements made constituted racial abuse. He denied using racist language, and though no evidence of racist intent was found, Ibrahimović was fined €4,000, and Lukaku €3,000.

Ibrahimović scored another brace in a 4–0 win over Crotone on 7 February, reaching the milestone of 500 and 501 total club career goals in the process. On 22 April, he signed a new contract extension to stay at the club for another season. On 9 May, Ibrahimović had to be substituted off in the second half of Milan's 3–0 victory at Juventus following an injury to his left knee, which would rule him out for the remainder of the season.

==== 2021–2023: Serie A title and retirement ====
On 12 September 2021, Ibrahimović made his first appearance for Milan since returning from injury and scored in a 2–0 win over Lazio, and in doing so, at the age of 39 years and 344 days he became the oldest non-Italian player to score a goal in the 123-year history of Serie A, breaking the record previously held by former Parma centre-back Bruno Alves. On 23 October, Ibrahimović scored Milan's fourth in a 4–2 win over Bologna, becoming the fourth player to score a Serie A goal after his 40th birthday after Alessandro Costacurta, Silvio Piola and Pietro Vierchowod. On 20 November, he scored two goals in a 4–3 loss to Fiorentina, and in doing so, became the oldest player to score a brace in a Serie A game as well as the first 40-year-old player to net a brace in Europe's top five leagues in the 21st century. On 11 December, Ibrahimović scored an acrobatic equalizer in stoppage-time in a 1–1 draw with Udinese, reaching the milestone of 300 career league goals across Europe's top five leagues, thus becoming just the third person in the 21st century to achieve it after Cristiano Ronaldo and Lionel Messi.

On 24 April 2022, Ibrahimović set up Sandro Tonali's 90th minute winner against Lazio, helping Milan take top spot in the league table. On 22 May, after the final match against Sassuolo, Milan won the Serie A title for the first time in 11 years, Ibrahimović also being part of their last title in 2011. He contributed with eight goals and three assists during the campaign. It was his overall 5th Serie A title (2 additional titles were revoked with Juventus), Ibrahimović dedicated the title to his agent and friend, Mino Raiola, who had died recently. Three days later, Ibrahimović revealed that he had played through an anterior cruciate ligament injury for six months during the season, for which he underwent surgical repair that day and would be off the pitch for at least seven months.

On 18 July 2022, it was announced that Ibrahimović had signed a one-year contract extension with Milan, staying for the next season. He returned to training in February 2023, but was left out of the club's Champions League squad. Ibrahimović returned to first-team action on 26 February 2023, his first appearance in nine months, in a 2–0 victory over Atalanta. On 18 March, he became the oldest goalscorer in Serie A history at the age of 41 years and 166 days when he scored in a 3–1 defeat to Udinese. On 4 June, Ibrahimović announced his retirement from football after Milan's final game of the Serie A season.

== International career ==
=== Youth ===
Ibrahimović said in a 2026 interview with Slaven Bilić that in addition to his Swedish passport, he also held a passport from Bosnia and Herzegovina, but he chose to play for Sweden.

In 1999, Ibrahimović played four games and scored one goal for the Sweden U18 team. In 2001, he made his debut for the Sweden U21 team and played in two games in the 2002 UEFA European Under-21 Championship qualifying campaign, including the second-leg game against Belgium in the qualification play-offs which saw Sweden eliminated from the competition. In total, Ibrahimović played seven games and scored six goals for the U21 team.

=== Senior ===
==== Early career and 2002 FIFA World Cup ====
Ibrahimović was eligible to represent Sweden, Bosnia and Herzegovina or Croatia at international level; he chose Sweden. He debuted in a goalless friendly draw against the Faroe Islands at Tipshallen on 31 January 2001 during the 2000–01 Nordic Football Championship. On 7 October 2001, he played his first competitive match, a 2002 World Cup qualifier against Azerbaijan, scoring his first ever international goal in a 3–0 win as Sweden topped their group to qualify for the upcoming tournament.

Ibrahimović was part of the Sweden squad at the 2002 FIFA World Cup held in Korea and Japan, who were eliminated at the round of 16 by newcomers Senegal. He appeared twice in the tournament, coming on as a substitute in the group stage game against Argentina and in the round of 16 match against Senegal.

==== UEFA Euro 2004 ====
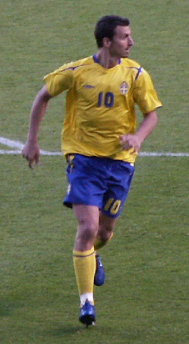
Ibrahimović playing for Sweden in June 2006

Sweden qualified for UEFA Euro 2004 as group winners, with Ibrahimović scoring three goals throughout the qualifying campaign. In Sweden's opening group match of Euro 2004 against Bulgaria on 14 June, Ibrahimović assisted one of Freddie Ljungberg's goals and later scored from a penalty in a 5–0 win. In the following match against Italy on 18 June, he scored an 85th-minute equaliser with a back-heel lob to seal a 1–1 draw and was named Man of the Match; the goal was later named the best goal of the tournament. Sweden and Denmark subsequently sealed a place in the knockout round on direct encounters following a 2–2 draw in their final group match, despite a three-way five-point tie with Italy, with Sweden topping the group. In the quarter-finals against the Netherlands, he missed a penalty in the resulting shoot-out following a 0–0 draw after extra-time, as Sweden were eliminated from the competition.

==== 2006 FIFA World Cup ====
During the 2006 World Cup qualification campaign, Ibrahimović scored a total of eight goals during the qualifying campaign, which ranked joint-third best among the UEFA teams together with Finland's Alexei Eremenko but behind the Czech Republic's Jan Koller (nine goals) and Portugal's Pauleta (eleven goals). Of them four goals in a 7–0 victory away to Malta on 4 September 2004.

He did not score during the 2006 World Cup finals. Sweden were knocked out in the round of 16, this time by Germany.

==== UEFA Euro 2008 ====
Ibrahimović was called up for a Euro 2008 qualifier against Liechtenstein on 6 September 2006, but two days before the match, he violated team curfew by leaving the hotel with teammates Christian Wilhelmsson and Olof Mellberg, visiting a nightclub. Though none of the players consumed any alcohol, they were nonetheless all sent home by manager Lars Lagerbäck as punishment and did not take part in the match. Mellberg and Wilhelmsson did not appeal the coach's decision, but Ibrahimović felt that it was unjust and therefore refused to take part in Sweden's next qualifiers against Iceland and Spain. He also refused to partake in a friendly against Egypt on 7 February 2007, but ended his self-imposed boycott a month later, and returned for Sweden's loss to Northern Ireland on 28 March. He did not score in any of the 12 qualifying matches. Ibrahimović was awarded the 2007 Swedish Golden Ball as the "Country's Top Player of the Year".

Ibrahimović ended his international goal drought, which had lasted for over two years, in a 2–0 win against Greece in Sweden's Euro 2008 opener on 10 June 2008, in which he was named Man of the Match, also scoring in the next match, a 2–1 defeat against eventual champions Spain, four days later. He finished the tournament with two goals as Sweden were eliminated in the group stage by Russia, following a 2–0 loss.

==== 2010 FIFA World Cup qualifying ====
Ibrahimović scored a goal in a 4–0 win against Malta on 10 June 2009 in a 2010 World Cup qualifier. On 5 September 2009, he scored a last second goal in Ferenc Puskás Stadium against Hungary in a 2–1 win for Sweden in their qualification match, although Sweden ultimately failed to qualify for the tournament, finishing third in their qualifying group.

==== UEFA Euro 2012 ====
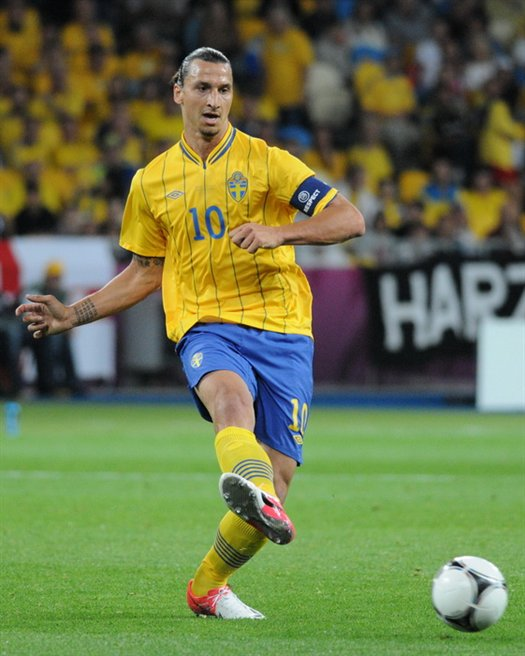
Ibrahimović playing for Sweden at UEFA Euro 2012

Ahead of the Euro 2012 qualification, Ibrahimović was named team captain on his return to the national team by manager Erik Hamrén. He scored his first goals of the qualifying game against San Marino, where he scored the first and fifth goals in a 6–0 win in front of over 21,000 home fans despite being down to ten men for over an hour. His next goals came in the form of a hat-trick against Finland, whom they beat 5–0.

At the Euro 2012 finals, Ibrahimović scored the opening goal in Sweden's first game of the tournament, a 2–1 defeat against hosts Ukraine. He then scored with a volley, later considered the goal of the tournament, to open the score in Sweden's 2–0 win against France in the last group match; he was later named Man of the Match. Despite the victory, Sweden were knocked out of the competition in the group stage. Although Sweden suffered a group stage elimination, Ibrahimović was named to the Team of the Tournament for his performances.

==== 2014 FIFA World Cup qualifying ====
In October 2012, Ibrahimović scored Sweden's first goal as they came from 4–0 down to draw 4–4 in a 2014 World Cup qualifier against Germany in Berlin. It was the first time in its history that the German national team had not won a match after leading by four goals.

On 14 November 2012, he scored all four goals in a 4–2 win over England in the first ever match at the Friends Arena. His fourth goal, a 35-yard overhead kick with his back to goal, won him praise from players and pundits, with The Guardian calling it "a moment of sublime mastery", while the BBC described it as a goal that "combined unfathomable imagination and expert technique". It would win Ibrahimović the 2013 FIFA Puskás Award for Goal of the Year. It is often considered one of the best goals of all time.

On 14 August 2013, Ibrahimović scored another international hat-trick at the Friends Arena, scoring Sweden's first three goals in a 4–2 friendly win against Scandinavian rivals Norway. Ibrahimović ended Sweden's qualifying campaign with eight goals. He scored twice in a 3–2 play-off defeat to Portugal – billed as a battle between Ibrahimović and Cristiano Ronaldo (Ronaldo scored three) – as the team failed to reach the 2014 World Cup. Ibrahimović summarised the defeat by saying: "One thing is for sure, a World Cup without me is nothing to watch."

==== Sweden's top scorer, UEFA Euro 2016 and initial retirement ====
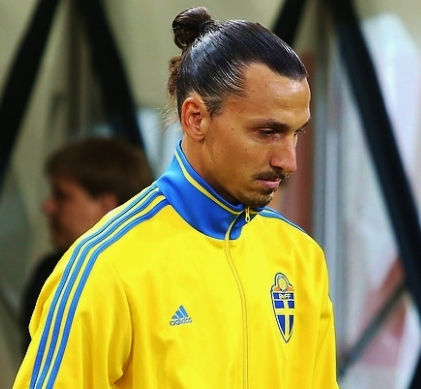
Ibrahimović (pictured in Russia in 2015) initially retired from international football after Euro 2016

On 4 September 2014, Ibrahimović scored his 50th international goal in a 2–0 friendly match victory over Estonia, making him the Swedish national team's all-time leading goalscorer. Earlier in the same match, he equaled Sven Rydell's record of 49 by scoring the opening goal. On 8 September, he made his 100th appearance for Sweden in a Euro 2016 qualifier against Austria at the Ernst Happel Stadion in Vienna. On 14 November 2015, Ibrahimović scored the winning goal for Sweden in a 2–1 victory in the home leg of the Euro 2016 qualifying play-off against rivals Denmark. Three days later, he scored both Sweden's goals of a 2–2 draw in Copenhagen to qualify the nation for the Euro 2016 finals. Ibrahimović scored eleven goals during the qualifying phase, making him the second-highest overall top scorer after Poland's Robert Lewandowski.

On 11 May 2016, Ibrahimović was included in the final 23-man squad for Sweden at Euro 2016. On 21 June 2016, he announced that he would retire from international football immediately after Sweden's last match at the tournament. The following day, Sweden finished their group in last place after a 1–0 loss against Belgium, and as a result were eliminated along with seven other teams in the first round. As captain, Ibrahimović played every minute of Sweden's three group matches, but did not score any goals, managing only one shot on target during the tournament.

==== Talks of comeback and return to the national team ====
In November 2017, after Sweden clinched qualification for the 2018 FIFA World Cup in Russia by defeating Italy in the second qualifying round, there was speculation about a possible return of Ibrahimović to the national team. Ibrahimović himself expressed his wish to represent Sweden in the World Cup. However, in April 2018, Sweden manager Janne Andersson stated that Ibrahimović would not be called up for the World Cup, thus ending any possibility of a return. Later in June, Ibrahimović blamed the Swedish media for his World Cup absence.

In November 2020, Ibrahimović hinted in a newspaper interview once again the possibility of returning to the Swedish national side, prompting Sweden manager Janne Andersson to fly to Milan to discuss the matter with him. On 15 March 2021, Andersson included Ibrahimović in the Sweden squad for 2022 FIFA World Cup qualifiers against Kosovo and Georgia, officially confirming his comeback to the side almost five years after his initial retirement. Ibrahimović responded to the announcement by simply tweeting "The return of the God". On 25 March, he started in a 1–0 home win against Georgia, providing the assist to Viktor Claesson's decisive goal, making him the oldest man in history to play for Sweden's national team. He then assisted Ludwig Augustinsson's opening goal in the following 3–0 win against Kosovo before being substituted in the 67th minute.

On 15 May 2021, days before Sweden was to announce their UEFA Euro 2020 squad, Andersson confirmed that Ibrahimović would not be included in the squad due to a knee injury he sustained with Milan days prior. He appeared as a late substitute in Sweden's 2022 FIFA World Cup qualifying play-off final against Poland on 29 March 2022, as Sweden lost 0–2 and failed to qualify for the 2022 FIFA World Cup.

On 15 March 2023, Andersson said Ibrahimović would be in the Sweden squad once more after a one-year absence, for their European Championship qualifiers against Belgium and Azerbaijan, but would not start the games. With his appearance against Belgium, he was initially hailed as being the oldest player to appear in a European Championship qualifier, breaking the record set by Dino Zoff. However, it was later confirmed that Lee Casciaro, who was four days older than Ibrahimović, had instead taken the record on the same day.

== Player profile ==
Swedish style? No. Yugoslavian style? Of course not. It has to be Zlatan-style.

— Downplaying the influence of his background, Ibrahimović describes his unique playing style

Ibrahimović has been described by ESPN as being "good in the air, quick, tall, strong and agile, he plays well with his back to goal and boasts some of the best finishing, vision, passing and ball control around." A versatile and well-rounded attacker, from a tactical standpoint, Ibrahimović was capable of playing anywhere along the front line, due to his ability to both create and score goals for his team, although he was most often deployed as a striker, due to his composure and eye for goal. He has also functioned in a more creative playmaking role at times, as a supporting forward or even as a number 10, in particular in his later career, after losing some of his pace and stamina with age; this deeper position allowed him to drop into midfield to pick up the ball, where he utilised his technical ability, vision, passing, and movement to create space and provide assists for teammates.

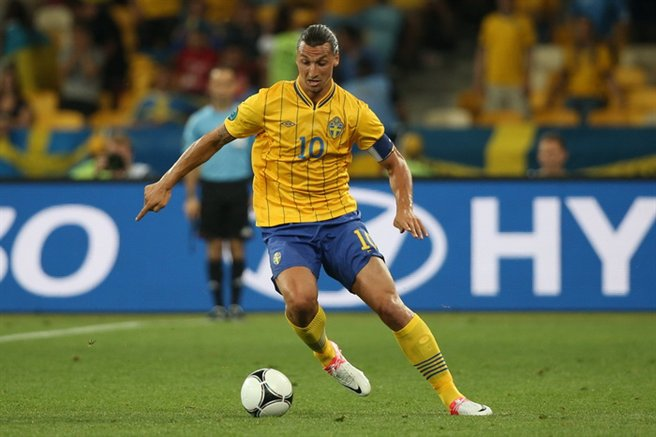
Ibrahimović on the ball for Sweden at UEFA Euro 2012

While naturally right-footed, Ibrahimović was equally accurate and dangerous with both feet, even in long-range attempts. He was also well-known for his accuracy from penalties and dead ball situations. An accurate finisher with both his head and feet, his height and physicality gave him an aerial advantage, and allowed him to function as a "target man", in particular in his later career, when he began to score more frequently with his head, while he initially scored more with his feet. Despite his large stature, Ibrahimović was surprisingly agile, given his exceptional athleticism. He has scored several goals from acrobatic strikes and volleys throughout his career, which earned him the moniker Ibracadabra in the Italian media. Ibrahimović possessed excellent technique and ball control, which, coupled with his balance and physicality, enabled him to hold up the ball well and link up with teammates; he has also been praised by pundits for his creativity and dribbling skills. Although pace was not his main element, he was also a quick player and a fast sprinter, who possessed significant acceleration in his youth, while still being able to clock top speeds over 30 km/h even into his 30s.

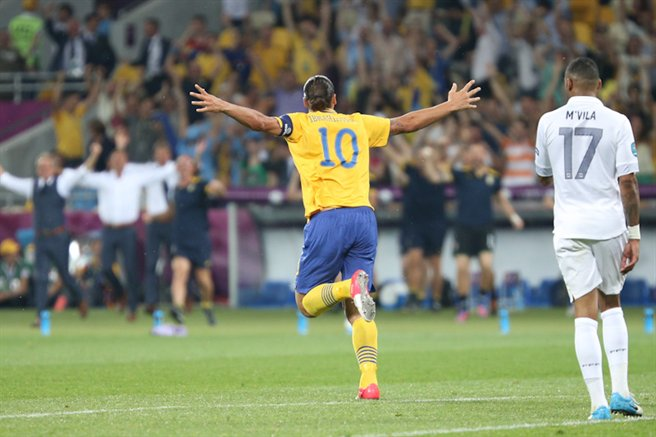
Ibrahimović celebrates after scoring with an acrobatic volley against France in June 2012. Like his idol Ronaldo, Ibrahimović often celebrated scoring a goal with both arms outstretched.

Considered to be a highly talented player in his youth, Ibrahimović came to be regarded by many to be one of the best players in the world during his prime, as well as one of the greatest strikers of his generation. He has also been regarded as one of the greatest strikers of all time, due to his well-rounded profile, consistency, success, longevity, and prolific goalscoring record.

Ibrahimović drew praise from managers and teammates for his leadership qualities, fitness, perfectionism and dedication. Regarding his work-ethic, his former Juventus manager Fabio Capello commented in 2016: "At the beginning of his first spell at Juventus [...] I noticed that he was weaker than I thought when he had to kick the ball and was not very strong in the air. Ibrahimovic [sic] loved making assists more than scoring goals. I wanted him to become more ruthless in front of goal and improve his finishing. He had the same technical skills as Van Basten and I made him watch some videos of him to improve his finishing. I told him to watch Van Basten's movements inside the area and the way he used to score goals. Ibra got it straight away; I think results are out there to prove it. He is a very humble guy and he worked every day to improve. He's proud of himself too, he loves being the best."

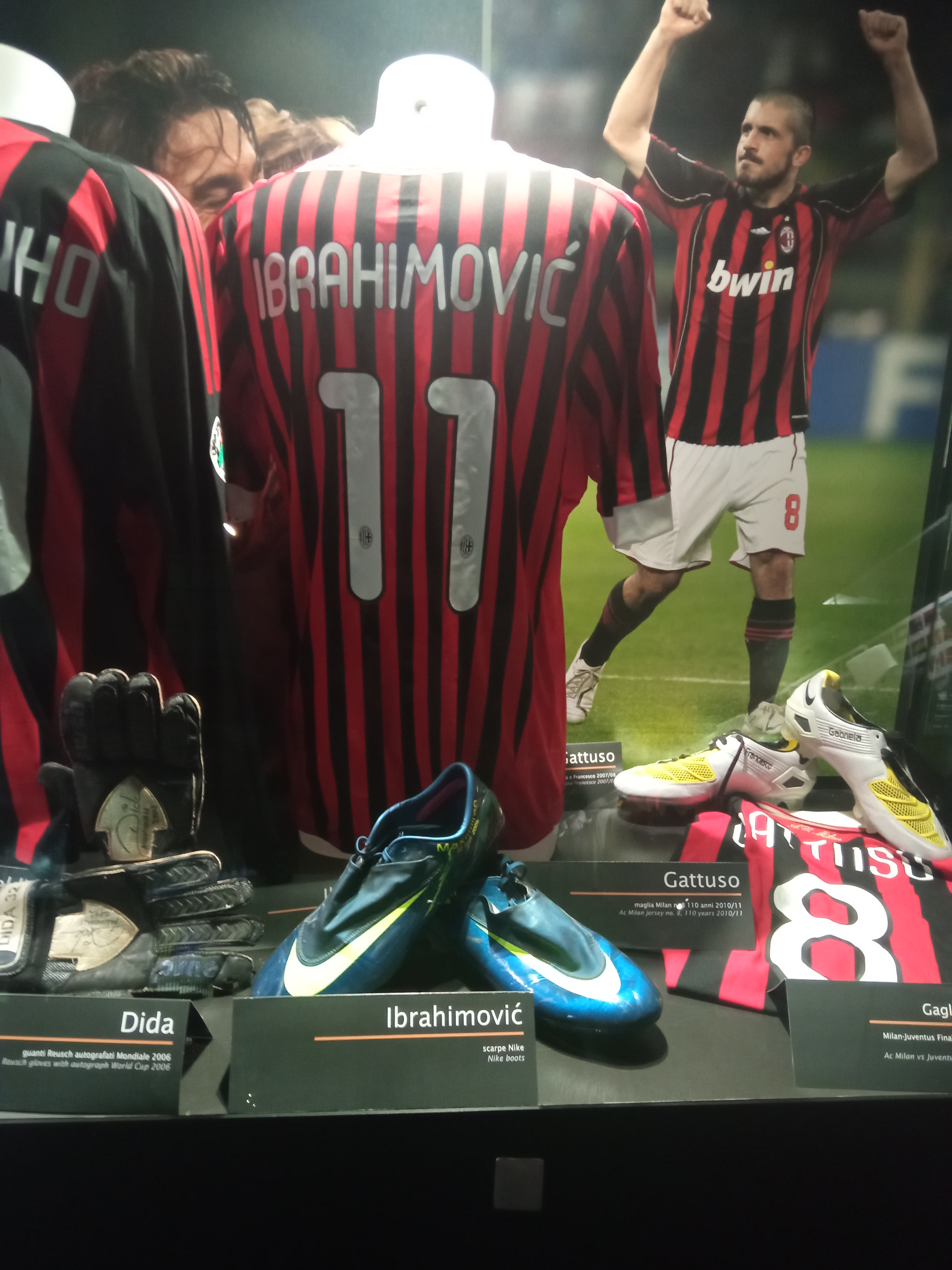
Ibrahimović‘s number 11 AC Milan jersey in the San Siro museum. He scored for both AC Milan and Inter Milan in the Derby della Madonnina.

Although Ibrahimović was criticised at times in the media for being inconsistent in high pressure situations, and for his limited work-rate, in particular in the Champions League earlier on in his career, throughout his career he scored in some of the biggest matches in football; these include some of the biggest derbies in Italy, Sweden, Spain, France, the Netherlands, the United States, and England. He has also made major big-match contributions in the UEFA Champions League, UEFA Europa League, and UEFA European Championship games. Moreover, in addition to being a prolific striker, he was also highly successful throughout his career, winning numerous titles in several countries. Additionally, he is the only player to have scored for six different clubs in the Champions League. Known for his strong mentality and leadership, as well as his extroverted and highly competitive personality, despite his success, he was criticised in the media for his arrogance, aggression and rebellious character, as well as his lack of discipline on the pitch, in particular in his early career, which led him to be involved in confrontations with other players, some of his managers and even reporters. Ibrahimović has frequently been compared to Dutchman Marco van Basten, due to their similar playing styles, physiques, and proclivity for scoring from powerful shots and volleys; despite this comparison, Ibrahimović has stated that his main influence was his idol, former Brazilian forward Ronaldo, whom he regards as the greatest player of all time. He has also been likened to the enigmatic French former footballer Eric Cantona, who also played for Manchester United.

== Post-playing career ==
On 11 December 2023, RedBird Capital Partners announced the hiring of Ibrahimović as a new senior adviser to AC Milan. Since then, despite not being officially part of AC Milan's managerial staff, Ibrahimović was deeply involved in the club's internal organizational matters, with RedBird's head Gerry Cardinale stating him to be his "proxy" at the club.

Ibrahimović served as one of the analysts alongside Alexi Lalas and Thierry Henry for Fox Sports' coverage of the 2026 FIFA World Cup, co-hosted by Canada, Mexico, and the United States.

== Football-related business activities ==
=== Hammarby IF ===
On 27 November 2019, it was announced that Ibrahimović had bought 23.5 percent of the shares in Hammarby IF, a Swedish top flight club from Stockholm. The seller was Anschutz Entertainment Group, also the owner of his former club LA Galaxy, who reduced their stake in Hammarby by half. In Sweden, all sport teams in the league systems are regulated to be nonprofit organizations, which means that a majority of the voting rights, or 51 percent, is still controlled by the members of the club. Fans of Malmö FF, who were unhappy with Ibrahimović's investment in another Swedish club, have vandalised his statue in Malmö on numerous occasions.

== Controversies ==
=== Violence ===
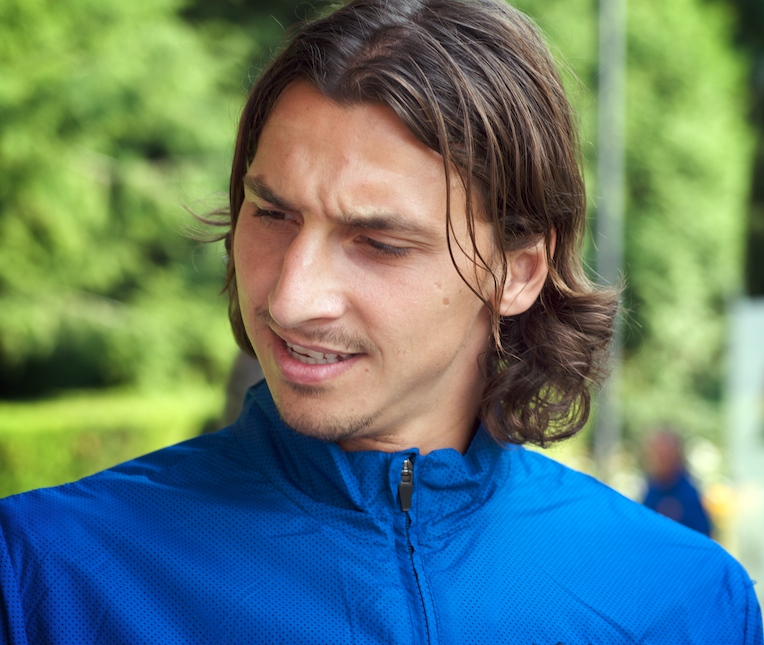
Ibrahimović in 2009

Ibrahimović has been involved in several violent incidents with teammates. When he was playing for Malmö FF's junior team, Ibrahimović headbutted a teammate after he was tackled by him during a training session. The teammate's father, a police officer, wanted the other players to sign a petition to expel Ibrahimović from the team. After a 2004 international friendly against the Netherlands, Ajax teammate Rafael van der Vaart publicly accused Ibrahimović of deliberately injuring him during the game. Ibrahimović responded by threatening to break both of van der Vaart's legs. Ibrahimović also reportedly punched Ajax teammate Mido in the dressing room after the latter had thrown a pair of scissors at him.

In 2010, Ibrahimović was involved in a training-ground fist-fight with Milan teammate Oguchi Onyewu, after Ibrahimović had made a two-footed tackle on Onyewu, followed by a headbutt. The two were separated and the session prematurely abandoned, with Ibrahimović suffering a broken rib. Both players had accused one of insulting the other.

Ibrahimović made a violent tackle on Inter defender Marco Materazzi during a Milan derby in the 2010–11 Serie A season, resulting in Materazzi's hospitalization. Ibrahimović later revealed that he did so intentionally, stating that he had "waited for this moment for the last four years" because of a tackle that Materazzi made on him while Ibrahimović was playing for Juventus.

In March 2011, Ibrahimović was given a three-match ban for punching Bari defender Marco Rossi in the stomach during a game. He received another three-match ban in February 2012 for slapping Napoli player Salvatore Aronica. In 2011, Ibrahimović kicked teammate Antonio Cassano in the head while Cassano was speaking to reporters.

In November 2012, while with Paris Saint-Germain, Ibrahimović received a two-match ban for kicking Saint-Étienne goalkeeper Stéphane Ruffier in the chest. In December 2012, he was accused by Lyon defender Dejan Lovren and president Jean-Michel Aulas of deliberately stamping on Lovren's head. Lovren suggested the reason Ibrahimović had escaped punishment was due to his "superstar status". In February 2013, UEFA handed Ibrahimović a two-match ban for stamping on Valencia winger Andrés Guardado.

On 21 May 2018, Ibrahimović was sent off for slapping Montreal Impact player Michael Petrasso in the head, after the latter had stepped on his foot. In April 2019, Real Salt Lake defender Nedum Onuoha accused Ibrahimović of foul play and threats to injure him during a game, calling him "arrogant", "disrespectful", and "a complete thug". In May 2019, Ibrahimović received a two-match ban for violent conduct, after he had grabbed New York City FC goalkeeper Sean Johnson by the neck.

=== Abuse ===
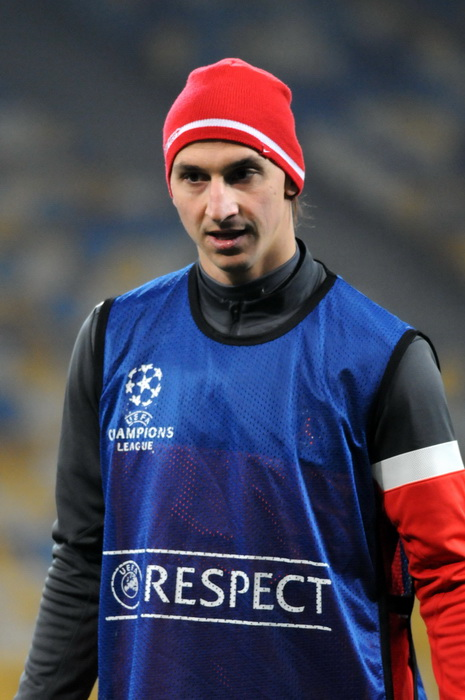
Ibrahimović (pictured at Paris Saint-Germain in 2012) courted controversy while at the club, for abuse of match officials and for on-field violence against opposition players.

In March 2013, PSG winger Lucas Moura claimed that Ibrahimović regularly insulted teammates, stating, "He always asks for the ball and insults a lot. He is sometimes a bit arrogant and complains." Moura later claimed, however, that the interview was twisted and badly translated. In May 2013, Ibrahimović was filmed screaming at PSG sporting director Leonardo after the club's title victory.

Lyon coach Hubert Fournier accused Ibrahimović of abusing officials, stating in January 2015 that "all the referees in this league get insulted by this person". Two months later, following a Ligue 1 loss to Bordeaux, Ibrahimović was recorded ranting about the level of officiating in the match, proclaiming: "In 15 years I've never seen a [good] referee in this shit country ... [they] don't even deserve PSG." He later apologised, but was criticised by French politicians, and Ligue 1 imposed a four-match ban.

On 20 July 2019, Ibrahimović elbowed Mohamed El Monir during a match with the LA Galaxy against Los Angeles FC, then had an altercation after the match with their goalkeeping coach Zak Abdel, telling him: "Go home. You little bitch. Go home". More controversy followed suit when, following Galaxy's loss to crosstown rivals Los Angeles in the playoffs, Ibrahimović was seen making obscene gestures towards heckling fans as he left the pitch.

Ibrahimović received a one-match ban following an altercation with former teammate Romelu Lukaku in his side's Coppa Italia fixture against Inter Milan in January 2021, in which pitchside microphones picked up Ibrahimović repeatedly telling Lukaku, "Go do your voodoo shit", calling him a "little donkey", and telling him to "call [his] mother". Ibrahimović denied accusations of racism, posting on Twitter: "there is no place for racism." An investigation was opened by the Italian Football Federation, with a potential ten-match ban for Ibrahimović if found guilty of racial abuse. However, it was reported in March that he had been cleared of the charge, as the incident was deemed purely unsportsmanlike and only warranted a fine.

=== Falling out with Pep Guardiola ===
During his spell at Barcelona, Ibrahimović had a falling-out with coach Pep Guardiola, culminating in a dressing room incident in which Ibrahimović allegedly threw a training-kit box across the room and screamed insults at Guardiola. Guardiola eventually refused to speak to Ibrahimović and loaned him out to Milan. Barcelona vice president Carles Vilarrubi further alleged that Ibrahimović had threatened to publicly beat up Guardiola if he was not released to Milan. Ibrahimović stated that Pep Guardiola was "not a man" during an interview with CNN in November 2015.

=== Controversial remarks ===
What Carew does with a football, I can do with an orange.

— Ibrahimović in 2002

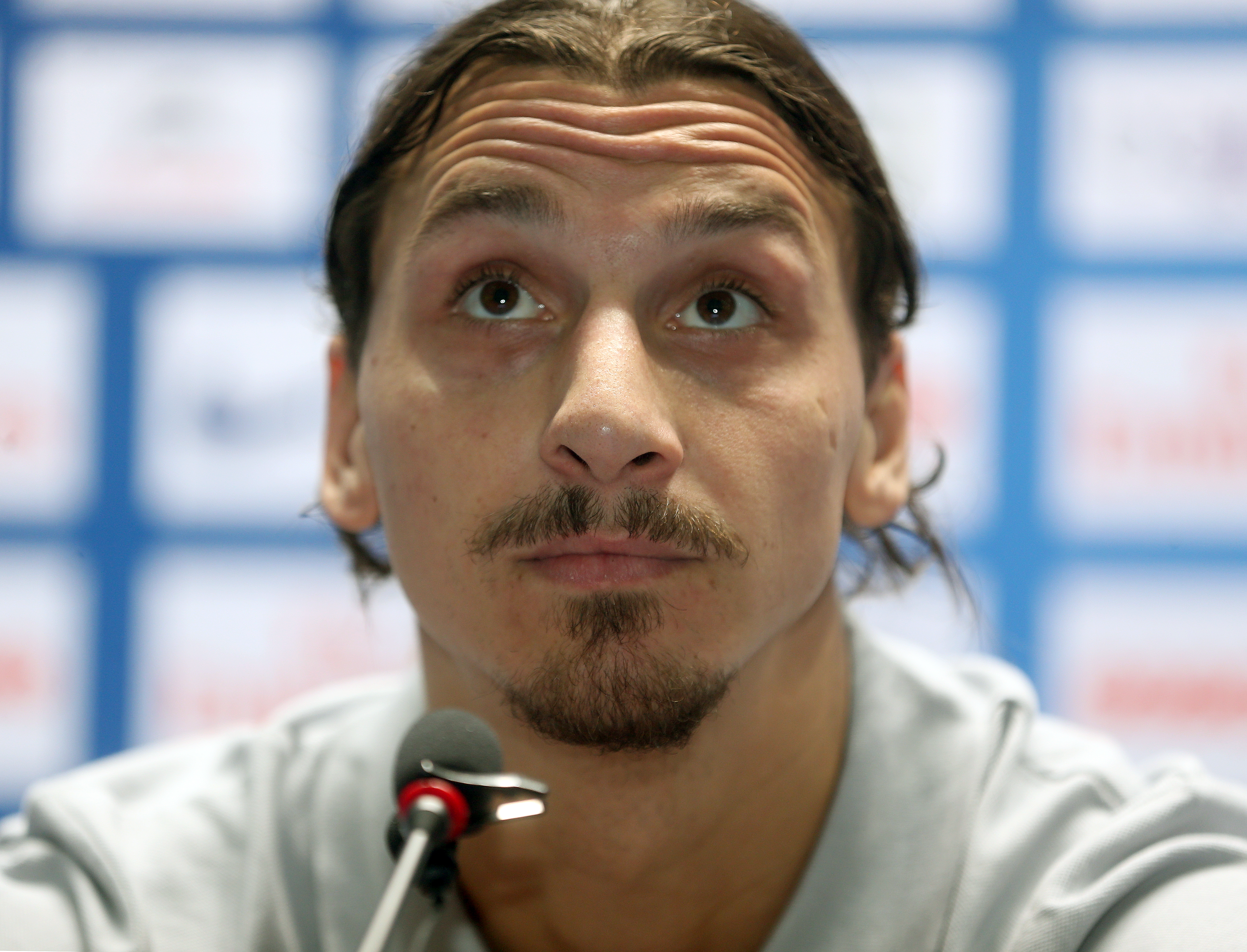
Ibrahimović at a press conference in Qatar in 2013

In 2013, Ibrahimović came under fire from the Sweden women's national team for an interview published on Christmas Day by tabloid Expressen, in which he had commented about the disparity of achievements by, and the treatment of, male and female footballers. His former teammate Anders Svensson had been rewarded with a car for becoming Sweden's most-capped player that year, but Therese Sjögran had received no such reward for doing likewise for the women's team, despite owning 41 more caps (187 to 146) than Svensson at the time. Ibrahimović's response to the issue was that Sweden would be "devaluing" Svensson "by comparing him with the ladies' individual achievements. They can get a bike with my autograph on it and then we're good." Coach Pia Sundhage replied that his comments were "sad and unfortunate" and epitomised "failings in the basic values of male football", while Sjögran said, "I understand him when he says that the men's national team brings in more money and exposure. That's true. But this is about respect."

=== Hammarby investment ===
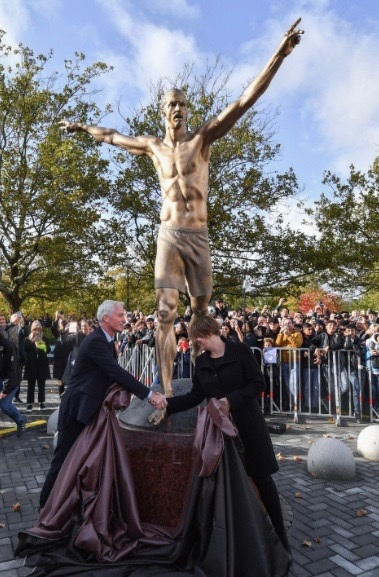
The Statue of Zlatan was unveiled in Malmö in 2019. After he invested in rival club Hammarby, Malmö fans vandalized the statue with spray paint and set it ablaze, before it was removed from its plinth on 5 January 2020.

In November 2019, Ibrahimović bought a 23.5% stake in Stockholm-based club Hammarby, who were the rivals of the striker's boyhood team, Malmö FF. In a statement, Ibrahimović expressed his admiration for the club and its fans, and how he was excited for the opportunity to support "one of the most interesting and influential clubs in Sweden." However, this investment decision infuriated many fans of Malmö who considered it a betrayal, and they vandalized his bronze statue and set it ablaze. Ibrahimović responded to the incident by claiming that the decision had nothing to do with where he began his career.

=== Involvement in betting ===
In April 2021, Ibrahimović was investigated by UEFA over alleged financial interest in a betting company called "Bethard". A month later, he was fined €50,000 by UEFA for breaking disciplinary regulations related to his interest in the aforementioned betting company.

=== Qatar visit ===
During the controversial 2022 FIFA World Cup, Ibrahimović visited Qatar, amidst a widespread boycott of the tournament. Ibrahimović later stated that he had a "10/10" experience during his time in the country and praised Qatari politics, stating that "Qatar has a system that works" while "Sweden does not have a system that fully works". His remarks faced widespread criticism from media and numerous human rights activists who raised concerns about the state of human rights in Qatar.

== Personal life ==
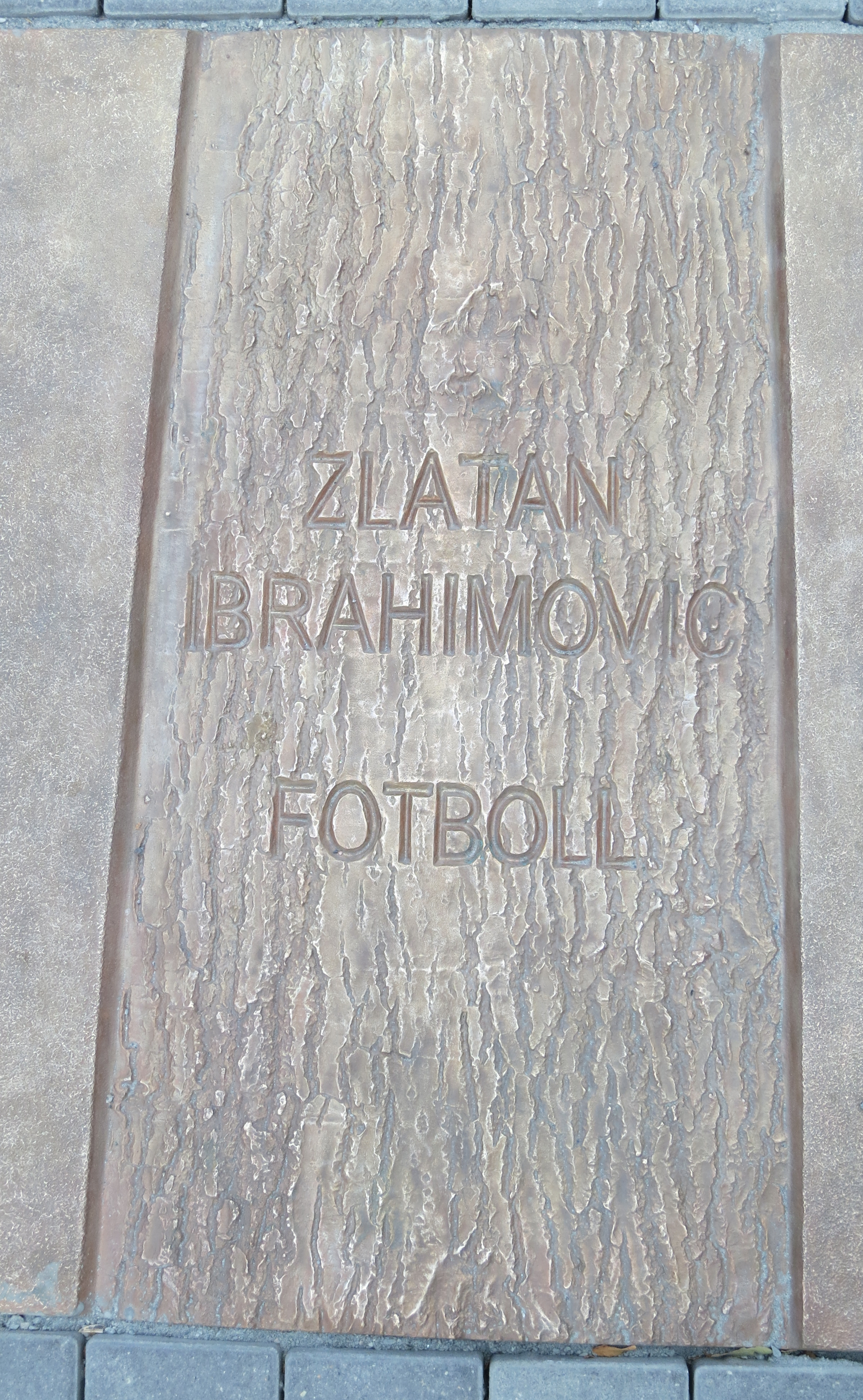
Ibrahimović inscription on the Walk of Fame in his hometown Malmö

Ibrahimović has one sibling (Sanela) and four half-siblings. His longtime partner is Helena Seger, with whom he has two sons, Maximilian and Vincent. Both sons are professional football players. He used to reside outside Los Angeles when he played for LA Galaxy. He still has a home in Malmö, where he spends his summers. Ibrahimović received an honorary black belt in taekwondo; he attended classes at the Malmö Taekwondo club Enighet ("Unity") as a child. Ibrahimović is fluent in five languages: Swedish, Bosnian, English, Spanish and Italian. He has stated that he was raised as a Catholic. Ibrahimović often refers to himself in the third person.

The name "Zlatan" was trademarked in May 2003 at the Swedish Patent and Registration Office for "most likely being perceived as Zlatan Ibrahimović", meaning he receives exclusive rights to the name for certain products, including sporting goods, clothing, and shoes.

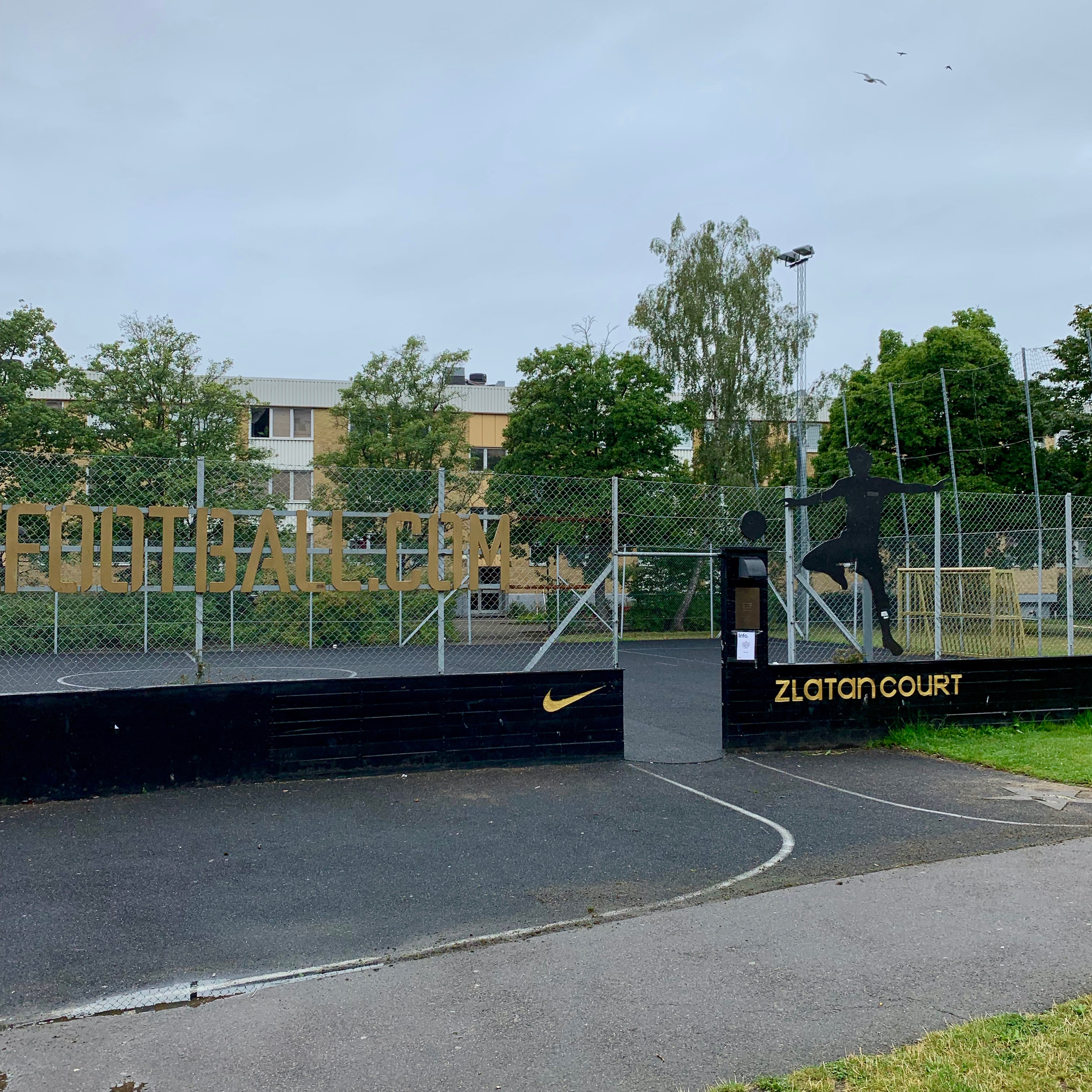
Zlatan Court entrance in Malmö with assistance of his sponsor Nike

Ibrahimović is under contract with Nike and features in their television advertising where he has appeared alongside other players endorsed by the company, including Cristiano Ronaldo, Neymar and Wayne Rooney. He wears the Nike Mercurial boot line and has the names and dates of birth of his sons embedded onto the external sides of his boots. In late 2007, Ibrahimović, with the help of Nike, self-funded Zlatan Court in the streets of the city district Rosengård in his hometown Malmö: he provided a playing mat, goalposts, lighting and a modern fence. In 2008, he donated new Nike kits to his youth club, FBK Balkan.

In a February 2011 interview, Ibrahimović stated that the boxer Muhammad Ali is one of his role models, going on to say: "One of my idols in sport and outside the sport also [sic]. [...] He believed in his [principles] and he never gave [them] up." While in Malmö with the national team in September 2012, Ibrahimović was honoured with the inscription of his name on the city's "Walk of Fame of Sports". The Swedish Post Office issued a set of five postage stamps featuring Ibrahimović in March 2014. Ibrahimović features in EA Sports' FIFA video game series, and was the fourth highest rated player in FIFA 15.

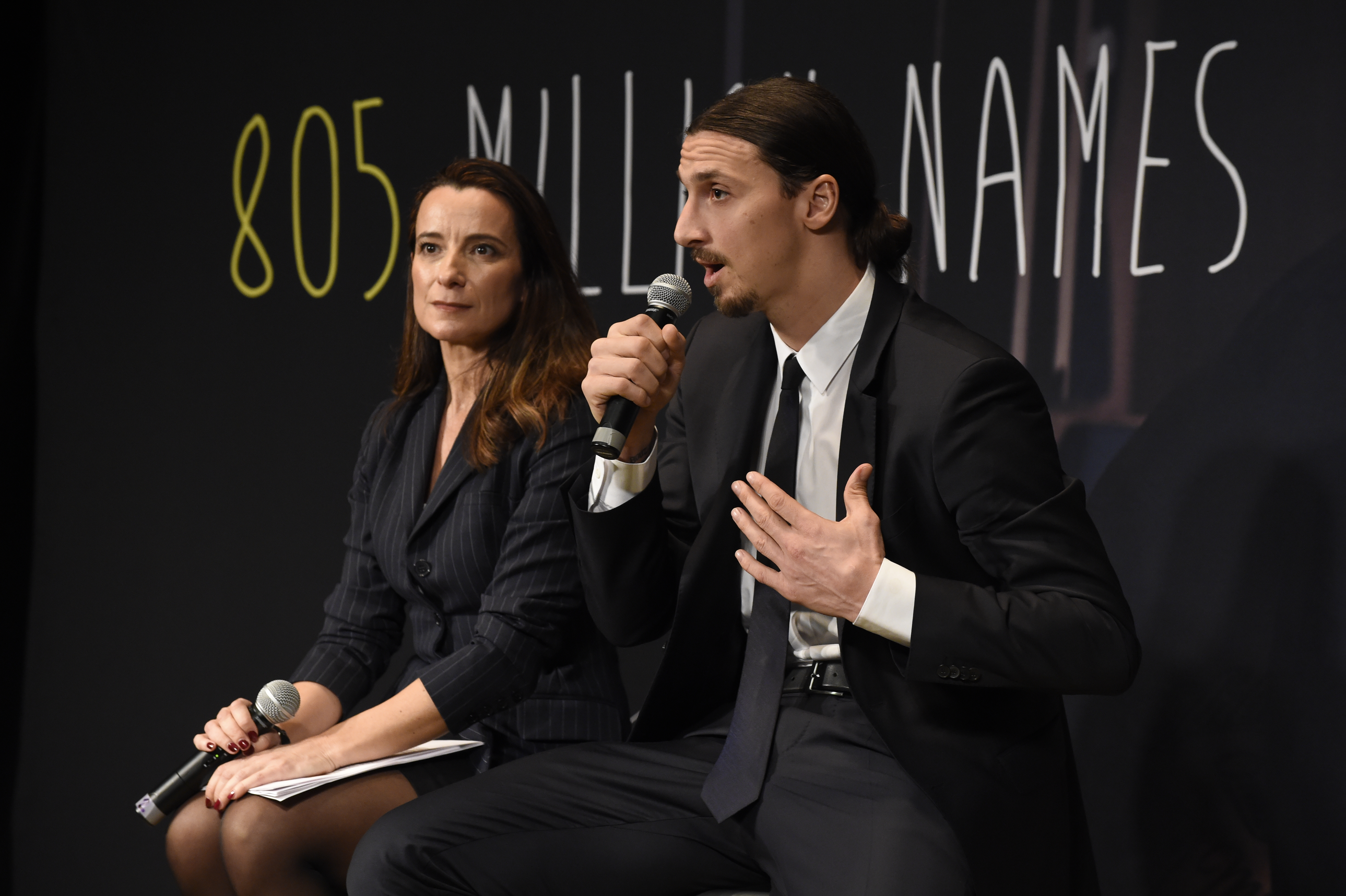
An ambassador for the United Nations World Food Programme, Ibrahimović appears at the global awareness campaign "805 million names" launch with its founder Marina Catena in 2015.

On 11 August 2014, Ibrahimović paid US $51,000 to send the Swedish national football team for the intellectually disabled to the INAS World Football Championships in Brazil. After teammates Johan Elmander, Kim Källström, Andreas Isaksson and Per Nilsson donated autographed jerseys to be auctioned off for the cause, Ibrahimović responded, "What the hell are you going to do with a shirt? How much is it to go?". In a league match against Caen on 14 February 2015, Ibrahimović took off his shirt after scoring a goal to unveil the removable tattooed names of 50 people suffering from hunger around the world, in a gesture to raise awareness for famine in accordance with the United Nations World Food Programme.

Active on social media, Ibrahimović has over 55 million Instagram followers, the most for a Swede. Independent Swedish film production company Auto Images released the sports documentary Becoming Zlatan in February 2016 which follows Ibrahimović through his formative years with Malmö FF and Ajax all the way to his breakthrough with Juventus in 2005. The film has been featured at several film festivals including the International Documentary Film Festival Amsterdam, Helsinki Documentary Film Festival and the Rouen Nordic Film Festival amongst others. He does not drink alcohol.

In 2018, Ibrahimović mentioned that his wife only allows him to hang one picture of himself at home: "My wife does not allow me to have pictures of myself", then added, "There is one of my feet on the wall. That is what has given us what we have, it is a reminder for the family, not for me, of what we have."

On 8 October 2019, a statue of Ibrahimović was unveiled in his hometown, outside Malmö's Stadion. The statue, created by Peter Linde, is 2.7 m (8 ft 9 in) tall and weighs almost 500 kg (1,100 lb).

=== Religious and social background ===
Ibrahimović was born to a Bosniak Muslim father, Šefik Ibrahimović, and a Croat Catholic mother, Jurka Gravić; his parents were immigrants to Sweden from SFR Yugoslavia—Šefik from Bijeljina, SR Bosnia and Herzegovina and Jurka from Prkos near Škabrnja, SR Croatia—and met for the first time in Sweden. Ibrahimović's parents divorced when he was a child, and although his upbringing was divided between them, he spent more time with his father: "I had time with my mother but I really lived with my father." Relatives on both sides of his family were killed in the Bosnian War of the early 1990s. He has said in a 2012 interview with PSG that: "My father is Muslim, my mother is Catholic, but none of that has anything to do with football. I received a special education. I'm me and football is a religion in its own right, and everyone is welcome..." Ibrahimović was incensed in 2005 when Italian media attempted to build interest in a Juventus–Inter match by describing it as a "mini Balkan War" between himself and Serbian opponent Siniša Mihajlović. He said that he had no interest in nationalism, partially due to his mixed Bosniak-Croat parentage and his younger half-brother being fathered by a Serb.

In an interview with CNN on 24 November 2015, he stressed that his Muslim background was "not a factor" in fans' perception of him: "For me, it didn't change (anything) because my father is Muslim and my mother is Catholic... For me it is all about respect. That's how I grew up and the way I learned to be. This is what I am." Zlatan described himself as a "deeply faithful Catholic" in 2017, but later suggested in 2024 that he did not believe in God following his brother's death from leukaemia, stating, "In my world, you are your own God." The Malmö-based television presenter Teddy Landén, who was interviewed for the same documentary, noted Ibrahimović's name change on his rugby shirt following his 2001 transfer to Ajax. He believed that Ibrahimović chose to replace his first name on the jersey with his last name to honour his family background and show children from Rosengård and Malmö in general: "If I can do it, you can do it." In Ibrahimović's autobiography, he says that this change was only because his relationship with his father had improved at the time.

On 18 February 2021, during a Europa League Round of 32 match between Red Star Belgrade and AC Milan at the Rajko Mitić Stadium, Ibrahimović was subjected to racism by the Red Star fans. Ibrahimović, who did not play the match, watched the game from the stands and jumped to celebrate once Milan scored, when a fan shouted insults at him, including "balija"—an ethnic slur targeting Bosnian Muslims. The match was played behind the closed doors due to the COVID-19 pandemic, but a few supporters were allowed to spectate from a VIP box. Red Star Belgrade issued an apology and condemned the insults; however, UEFA opened an investigation of the incident nevertheless. On 14 April 2021, the club was fined €30,000 and ordered to play a home game in European competition behind closed doors.

=== Tattoos ===
His surname is tattooed in Arabic on the back of his right arm, the names of his sons Vincent and Maximilian on his right arm. He has the common Buddhist "Five Deva Faces Yantra" representing wind, water, fire, creative perception and space, arranged in a way believed to ward off illness and injury, on his lower back, in addition to a roaring lion. Another Buddhist tattoo, a "Yant Prajao Khao Nirote" is a protective emblem intended to end the suffering of a family, is on his upper right arm. The phrase "Only God can judge me" is tattooed on his ribcage. He also has a feather, a Koi fish, Polynesian tribal, and ace of hearts and clubs.

== Career statistics ==
=== Club ===
Appearances and goals by club, season and competition
| Club | Season | League | | | National cup (Note: Includes Svenska Cupen, KNVB Cup, Coppa Italia, Copa del Rey, Coupe de France, FA Cup) | | League cup (Note: Includes Coupe de la Ligue, EFL Cup) | | Continental | | Other | | Total | |
| Club | Season | Division | Apps | Goals | Apps | Goals | Apps | Goals | Apps | Goals | Apps | Goals | Apps | Goals |
|---|---|---|---|---|---|---|---|---|---|---|---|---|---|---|
| Malmö FF | 1999 | Allsvenskan | 6 | 1 | 0 | 0 | — | | — | | — | | 6 | 1 |
| Malmö FF | 2000 | Superettan | 26 | 12 | 3 | 2 | — | | — | | — | | 29 | 14 |
| Malmö FF | 2001 | Allsvenskan | 8 | 3 | 4 | 0 | — | | — | | — | | 12 | 3 |
| Malmö FF | Total | | 40 | 16 | 7 | 2 | 0 | 0 | 0 | 0 | 0 | 0 | 47 | 18 |
| Ajax | 2001–02 | Eredivisie | 24 | 6 | 3 | 1 | — | | 6 (Note: Two appearances in UEFA Champions League, four appearances and two goals in UEFA Cup) | 2 | — | | 33 | 9 |
| Ajax | 2002–03 | Eredivisie | 25 | 13 | 3 | 3 | — | | 13 (Note: Appearance(s) in UEFA Champions League) | 5 | 1 (Note: Appearance in Johan Cruyff Shield) | 0 | 42 | 21 |
| Ajax | 2003–04 | Eredivisie | 22 | 13 | 1 | 0 | — | | 8 | 2 | — | | 31 | 15 |
| Ajax | 2004–05 | Eredivisie | 3 | 3 | — | | — | | — | | 1 | 0 | 4 | 3 |
| Ajax | Total | | 74 | 35 | 7 | 4 | 0 | 0 | 27 | 9 | 2 | 0 | 110 | 48 |
| Juventus | 2004–05 | Serie A | 35 | 16 | 0 | 0 | — | | 10 | 0 | — | | 45 | 16 |
| Juventus | 2005–06 | Serie A | 35 | 7 | 2 | 0 | — | | 9 | 3 | 1 (Note: Appearance in Supercoppa Italiana) | 0 | 47 | 10 |
| Juventus | Total | | 70 | 23 | 2 | 0 | 0 | 0 | 19 | 3 | 1 | 0 | 92 | 26 |
| Inter Milan | 2006–07 | Serie A | 27 | 15 | 1 | 0 | — | | 7 | 0 | 1 | 0 | 36 | 15 |
| Inter Milan | 2007–08 | Serie A | 26 | 17 | 0 | 0 | — | | 7 | 5 | 1 | 0 | 34 | 22 |
| Inter Milan | 2008–09 | Serie A | 35 | 25 | 3 | 3 | — | | 8 | 1 | 1 | 0 | 47 | 29 |
| Inter Milan | Total | | 88 | 57 | 4 | 3 | 0 | 0 | 22 | 6 | 3 | 0 | 117 | 66 |
| Barcelona | 2009–10 | La Liga | 29 | 16 | 2 | 1 | — | | 10 | 4 | 4 (Note: One appearance in Supercopa de España, one appearance in UEFA Super Cup, two appearances in FIFA Club World Cup) | 0 | 45 | 21 |
| Barcelona | 2010–11 | La Liga | — | | — | | — | | — | | 1 (Note: Appearance in Supercopa de España) | 1 | 1 | 1 |
| Barcelona | Total | | 29 | 16 | 2 | 1 | 0 | 0 | 10 | 4 | 5 | 1 | 46 | 22 |
| AC Milan (loan) | 2010–11 | Serie A | 29 | 14 | 4 | 3 | — | | 8 | 4 | — | | 41 | 21 |
| AC Milan | 2011–12 | Serie A | 32 | 28 | 3 | 1 | — | | 8 | 5 | 1 | 1 | 44 | 35 |
| AC Milan | Total | | 61 | 42 | 7 | 4 | 0 | 0 | 16 | 9 | 1 | 1 | 85 | 56 |
| Paris Saint-Germain | 2012–13 | Ligue 1 | 34 | 30 | 2 | 2 | 1 | 0 | 9 | 3 | — | | 46 | 35 |
| Paris Saint-Germain | 2013–14 | Ligue 1 | 33 | 26 | 2 | 3 | 2 | 2 | 8 | 10 | 1 (Note: Appearance in Trophée des Champions) | 0 | 46 | 41 |
| Paris Saint-Germain | 2014–15 | Ligue 1 | 24 | 19 | 3 | 4 | 3 | 3 | 6 | 2 | 1 | 2 | 37 | 30 |
| Paris Saint-Germain | 2015–16 | Ligue 1 | 31 | 38 | 6 | 7 | 3 | 0 | 10 | 5 | 1 | 0 | 51 | 50 |
| Paris Saint-Germain | Total | | 122 | 113 | 13 | 16 | 9 | 5 | 33 | 20 | 3 | 2 | 180 | 156 |
| Manchester United | 2016–17 | Premier League | 28 | 17 | 1 | 1 | 5 | 4 | 11 (Note: Appearances in UEFA Europa League) | 5 | 1 (Note: Appearance in FA Community Shield) | 1 | 46 | 28 |
| Manchester United | 2017–18 | Premier League | 5 | 0 | 0 | 0 | 1 | 1 | 1 | 0 | — | | 7 | 1 |
| Manchester United | Total | | 33 | 17 | 1 | 1 | 6 | 5 | 12 | 5 | 1 | 1 | 53 | 29 |
| LA Galaxy | 2018 | Major League Soccer | 27 | 22 | 0 | 0 | — | | — | | — | | 27 | 22 |
| LA Galaxy | 2019 | Major League Soccer | 29 | 30 | 0 | 0 | — | | — | | 2 (Note: Appearances in MLS Cup playoffs) | 1 | 31 | 31 |
| LA Galaxy | Total | | 56 | 52 | 0 | 0 | 0 | 0 | 0 | 0 | 2 | 1 | 58 | 53 |
| AC Milan | 2019–20 | Serie A | 18 | 10 | 2 | 1 | — | | — | | — | | 20 | 11 |
| AC Milan | 2020–21 | Serie A | 19 | 15 | 2 | 1 | — | | 6 | 1 | — | | 27 | 17 |
| AC Milan | 2021–22 | Serie A | 23 | 8 | 0 | 0 | — | | 4 | 0 | — | | 27 | 8 |
| AC Milan | 2022–23 | Serie A | 4 | 1 | 0 | 0 | — | | 0 | 0 | 0 | 0 | 4 | 1 |
| AC Milan | Total | | 64 | 34 | 4 | 2 | 0 | 0 | 10 | 1 | 0 | 0 | 78 | 37 |
| Career total | | | 637 | 405 | 47 | 33 | 15 | 10 | 149 | 57 | 18 | 6 | 866 | 511 |

=== International ===
Appearances and goals by national team and year
| National team | Year | Apps | Goals |
|---|---|---|---|
| Sweden | 2001 | 5 | 1 |
| Sweden | 2002 | 10 | 2 |
| Sweden | 2003 | 4 | 3 |
| Sweden | 2004 | 12 | 8 |
| Sweden | 2005 | 5 | 4 |
| Sweden | 2006 | 6 | 0 |
| Sweden | 2007 | 7 | 0 |
| Sweden | 2008 | 7 | 2 |
| Sweden | 2009 | 6 | 2 |
| Sweden | 2010 | 4 | 3 |
| Sweden | 2011 | 8 | 3 |
| Sweden | 2012 | 11 | 11 |
| Sweden | 2013 | 11 | 9 |
| Sweden | 2014 | 5 | 3 |
| Sweden | 2015 | 10 | 11 |
| Sweden | 2016 | 5 | 0 |
| Sweden | 2017 | 0 | 0 |
| Sweden | 2018 | 0 | 0 |
| Sweden | 2019 | 0 | 0 |
| Sweden | 2020 | 0 | 0 |
| Sweden | 2021 | 4 | 0 |
| Sweden | 2022 | 1 | 0 |
| Sweden | 2023 | 1 | 0 |
| Total | | 122 | 62 |

== Honours ==
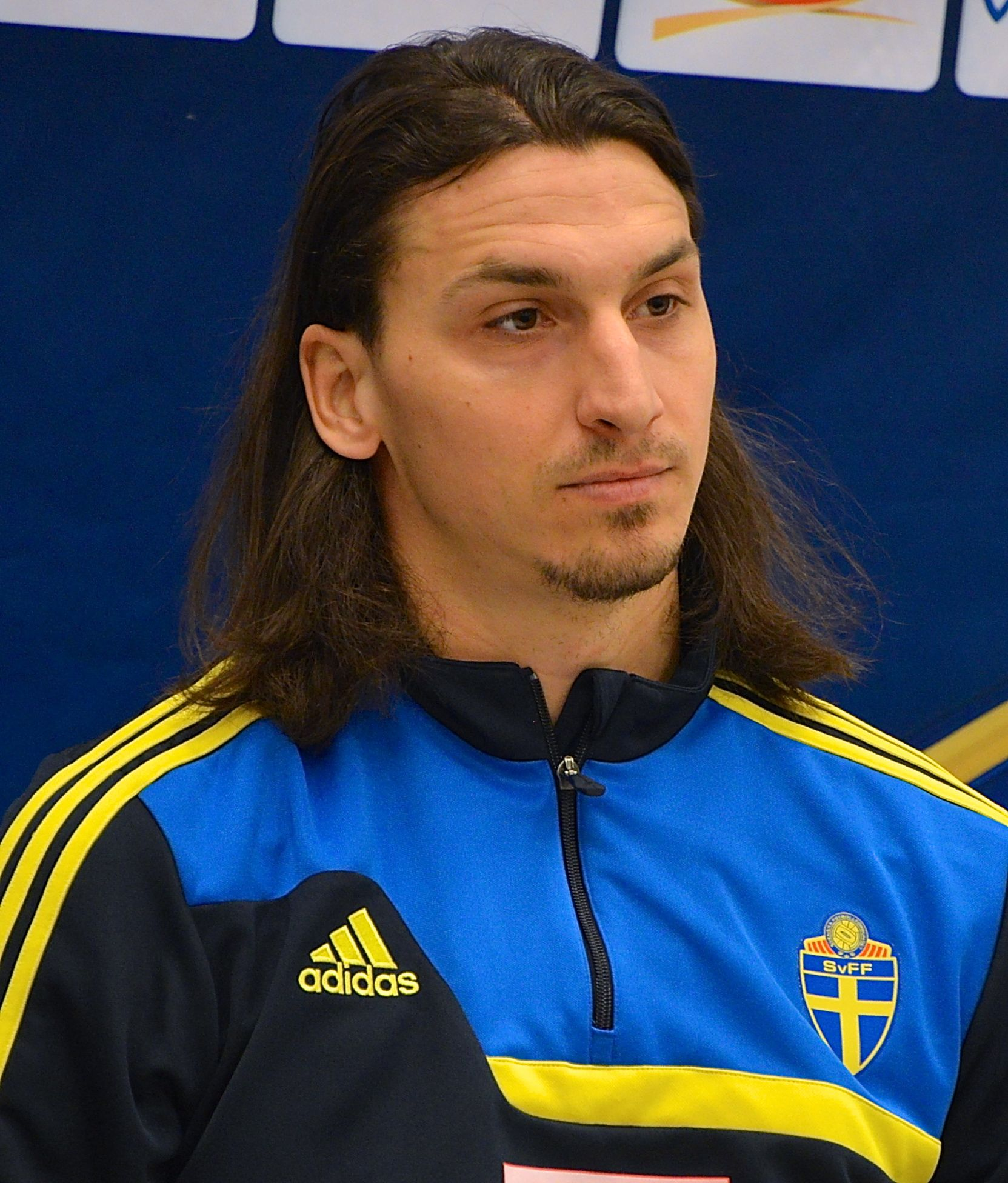
Ibrahimović played for the Sweden national team from 2001 until 2016 and from 2021 until 2023, and is Sweden's all-time leading goalscorer with 62 goals.

Ajax

- Eredivisie: 2001–02, 2003–04
- KNVB Cup: 2001–02
- Johan Cruyff Shield: 2002

Inter Milan

- Serie A: 2006–07, 2007–08, 2008–09
- Supercoppa Italiana: 2006, 2008

Barcelona

- La Liga: 2009–10
- Supercopa de España: 2009, 2010
- UEFA Super Cup: 2009
- FIFA Club World Cup: 2009

AC Milan

- Serie A: 2010–11, 2021–22
- Supercoppa Italiana: 2011

Paris Saint-Germain

- Ligue 1: 2012–13, 2013–14, 2014–15, 2015–16
- Coupe de France: 2014–15, 2015–16
- Coupe de la Ligue: 2013–14, 2014–15, 2015–16
- Trophée des Champions: 2013, 2014, 2015

Manchester United

- EFL Cup: 2016–17
- FA Community Shield: 2016
- UEFA Europa League: 2016–17

Individual

- Ballon d'Or nominations: 2003, 2004, 2005, 2007, 2008, 2009, 2012, 2013 (4th place), 2014, 2015, 2016
- Golden Foot: 2012
- Globe Soccer Awards Player Career Award: 2022
- FIFA Puskás Award: 2013
- FIFA FIFPro World XI: 2013
- UEFA President's Award: 2025
- UEFA Team of the Year: 2007, 2009, 2013, 2014
- UEFA Ultimate Team of the Year
- UEFA European Championship Team of the Tournament: 2012
- UEFA Champions League Squad of the Season: 2013–14
- UEFA Europa League Squad of the Season: 2016–17
- ESM Team of the Year: 2006–07, 2007–08, 2012–13, 2013–14
- L'Équipe Journalists' Best XI: 2008
- UEFA Euro 2004: Goal of the Tournament: Italy vs Sweden
- UEFA Euro 2012: Goal of the Tournament: Sweden vs France
- UEFA Champions League top assist provider: 2012–13
- Eurosport Goal of the Year: 2004
- Club van 100
- Juventus Player of the Year: 2004–05
- Serie A Player of the Month: September 2007, December 2008, January 2012, October 2020
- Serie A Foreign Footballer of the Year: 2004–05, 2007–08, 2008–09, 2010–11, 2011–12
- Serie A Footballer of the Year: 2007–08, 2008–09, 2010–11
- Serie A Most Loved Player: 2005
- Serie A Team of the Year: 2010–11, 2011–12
- Serie A Goal of the Year: 2008
- Capocannoniere: 2008–09, 2011–12
- Supercoppa Italiana Man of the Match: 2011
- Gazzetta Sports Awards Legend: 2020
- Italy Best Foreign Athlete: 2021
- Golden Tapir: 2008, 2011, 2012, 2020, 2021, 2024
- Sportschau Goal of the Month Award: November 2012
- Sportschau Goal of the Year Award: 2012
- GQ Men of the Year: 2013
- SportAccord 'Play for Change' Award: 2015
- Ligue 1 Player of the Month: September 2012, January 2014, February 2014, March 2014, November 2015
- UNFP Just Fontaine Trophy Ligue 1 Best Forward of the Season: 2012–13
- Ligue 1 Best Foreign Player: 2012, 2013, 2014
- Ligue 1 Player of the Year: 2012–13, 2013–14, 2015–16
- Ligue 1 Team of the Year: 2012–13, 2013–14, 2014–15, 2015–16
- Ligue 1 top scorer: 2012–13, 2013–14, 2015–16
- Ligue 1 Goal of the Year: 2014
- Étoile d'Or France Football: 2014, 2016
- Trophée des Champions Man of the Match: 2014
- Coupe de la Ligue Man of the Match: 2014–15
- Coupe de France Man of the Match: 2015–16
- Coupe de la Ligue Top scorer: 2014–15
- Coupe de France Top scorer: 2014–15, 2015–16
- Paris Saint-Germain Player of the Month: August 2012, September 2012, November 2013, January 2014, February 2015, November 2015, December 2015, January 2016, February 2016
- Paris Saint-Germain Hall of Fame
- Paris Saint-Germain Team of the History
- Medal of the City of Paris: 2016
- Eurosport European Player of the Month: August 2016
- Premier League Player of the Month: December 2016
- PFA Fans' Premier League Player of the Month: December 2016
- Manchester United Player of the Month: December 2016, February 2017
- Alan Hardaker Trophy: 2017
- EFL Cup top scorer: 2016–17
- MLS All-Star: 2018, 2019
- MLS Best XI: 2018, 2019
- MLS Newcomer of the Year: 2018
- MLS Goal of the Year: 2018
- MLS Greatest Goal: 2020
- Best MLS Player ESPY Award: 2019
- LA Galaxy Player of the Year: 2018, 2019
- LA Galaxy Golden Boot: 2018, 2019
- LA Galaxy Goal of the Year: 2018, 2019
- Pegasus Award: 2004
- Stor Grabb: 2004
- Guldbollen: 2005, 2007, 2008, 2009, 2010, 2011, 2012, 2013, 2014, 2015, 2016, 2020
- Jerringpriset: 2007
- Fotbollskanalens hederspris: 2008
- IFFHS Men's All Time Sweden Dream Team
- International Swede of the Year Award: 2013
- Eliason Merit Award: 2018
- Malmö Walk of Fame: 2012
- Medal of the City of Malmö: 2015
- Swedish Newcomer of the Year: 2001
- Swedish Football Personality of the Year: 2002
- Swedish Forward of the Year: 2005, 2007, 2008, 2009, 2010, 2011, 2012, 2013, 2014, 2015, 2016, 2017, 2018, 2019, 2020
- Swedish Male Athlete of the Year: 2008, 2010, 2013, 2015
- Swedish Goal of the Year: 2012, 2013

Records

Overall

- The only player to have scored at least a goal in De Klassieker in Netherlands, Derby della Madonnina and Derby d'Italia in Italy, El Clásico and Derbi barceloní in Spain, Le Classique in France, Manchester Derby and North-West Derby in England, El Tráfico and California Clásico in United States.
- The only player to score in the UEFA Champions League with six teams: Ajax, Juventus, Inter Milan, Barcelona, AC Milan and Paris Saint-Germain.
- The only player to score on his Premier League, Serie A, La Liga, Ligue 1, MLS, and UEFA Champions League debut.
- The only player to have scored 50 Serie A goals for both Inter Milan and AC Milan.
- The only foreign player to have won Capocannoniere with two teams, in addition to two teams from the same city: Inter Milan (2008–09) and AC Milan (2011–12).
- One of three players, after Adrian Mutu and John Carew, to have scored in European competitions with seven different teams.
- Oldest player to score in Serie A history.

Paris Saint-Germain

- First Paris Saint-Germain player to be top goalscorer in three Ligue 1 seasons (2012–13, 2013–14, 2015–16) (equalled by Kylian Mbappé).
- Most Ligue 1 goals in a single season: 38 in 2015–16 season
- Fastest Ligue 1 hat-trick: 9 minutes (vs. Troyes, 13 March 2016)
- Longest goalscoring run in Ligue 1: 9 consecutive matches in 2015–16 season (shared with Vahid Halilhodžić)
- Most goals scored in a single season (all competitions): 50 in 2015–16 season
- All-time top scorer in Le Classique: 11 goals

Manchester United

- The second player (after Ian Storey-Moore in the 1971–72 season (Note: Ibrahimović was the first Manchester United player in the Premier League format.)) to score in his first three league matches
- The second player (after Javier Hernández in the 2010–11 season) to score in the Premier League, FA Cup, League Cup, European competition and Community Shield in a single season (2016–17 season)
- Scored the 25,000th goal in Premier League history
- The oldest player to reach 15 goals in a single Premier League season (2016–17 season at 35 years and 125 days; since eclipsed by Cristiano Ronaldo in 2022)

LA Galaxy

- Most MLS regular season goals in a season: 30 in 2019 season

Sweden

- All-time top goalscorer for Sweden national team: 62 goals
- Sweden's top goalscorer in UEFA European Championship: 6 goals
- Sweden's only player to score in three consecutive UEFA European Championship tournaments: 2004, 2008 and 2012
- Most Guldbollen (Swedish Male footballer of the Year) awards: 12

== Orders ==
- H. M. The King's Medal

== Books ==
- Ibrahimovic, Zlatan; David Lagercrantz (22 March 2012). Jag är Zlatan Ibrahimović: min historia [I Am Zlatan Ibrahimović] (in Swedish). Stockholm: Albert Bonniers Förlag. ISBN 978-0-241-96683-9. OCLC 857923830. UK edition: ISBN 978-0-241-96683-9.
- Ibrahimovic, Zlatan; Luigi Garlando (2 December 2021). Adrenalina. My untold stories [Adrenaline: My Untold Stories] (in Italian). Milan: Cairo. ISBN 9788830901988. OCLC 1360352275.

== Discography ==
=== Singles ===
| Year | Album | Peak positions |
| Year | Album | SWE |
|---|---|---|
| 2014 | "Du gamla, Du fria" (Zlatan featuring Day) (produced by Max Martin) | 13 |

== Filmography ==
Film
| Year | Title | Role | Notes | Ref. |
|---|---|---|---|---|
| 2022 | The Soccer Football Movie | Himself | | |
| 2023 | Asterix & Obelix: The Middle Kingdom | Caius Antivirus | | |

== See also ==
- List of footballers with 100 or more UEFA Champions League appearances
- List of top international men's football goalscorers by country
- List of men's footballers with 100 or more international caps
- List of men's footballers with 50 or more international goals
- List of international goals scored by Zlatan Ibrahimović
- List of men's footballers with 500 or more goals
