= 58th Guldbagge Awards =

Annual Swedish film awards ceremony

- Date: 23 January 2023
- Site: Cirkus, Stockholm
- Hosted by: Parisa Amiri

Highlights
- Best Picture: Triangle of Sadness
- Most awards: Triangle of Sadness (6)
- Most nominations: Triangle of Sadness (9)

Television coverage
- Network: SVT

The 58th Guldbagge Awards ceremony, presented by the Swedish Film Institute, honoring the best Swedish films of 2022 and took place on 23 January 2023 at Cirkus in Stockholm. The ceremony was televised by SVT, and was hosted by television presenter Parisa Amiri.

Triangle of Sadness won a leading six awards out of its leading nine nominations.

== Winners and nominees ==
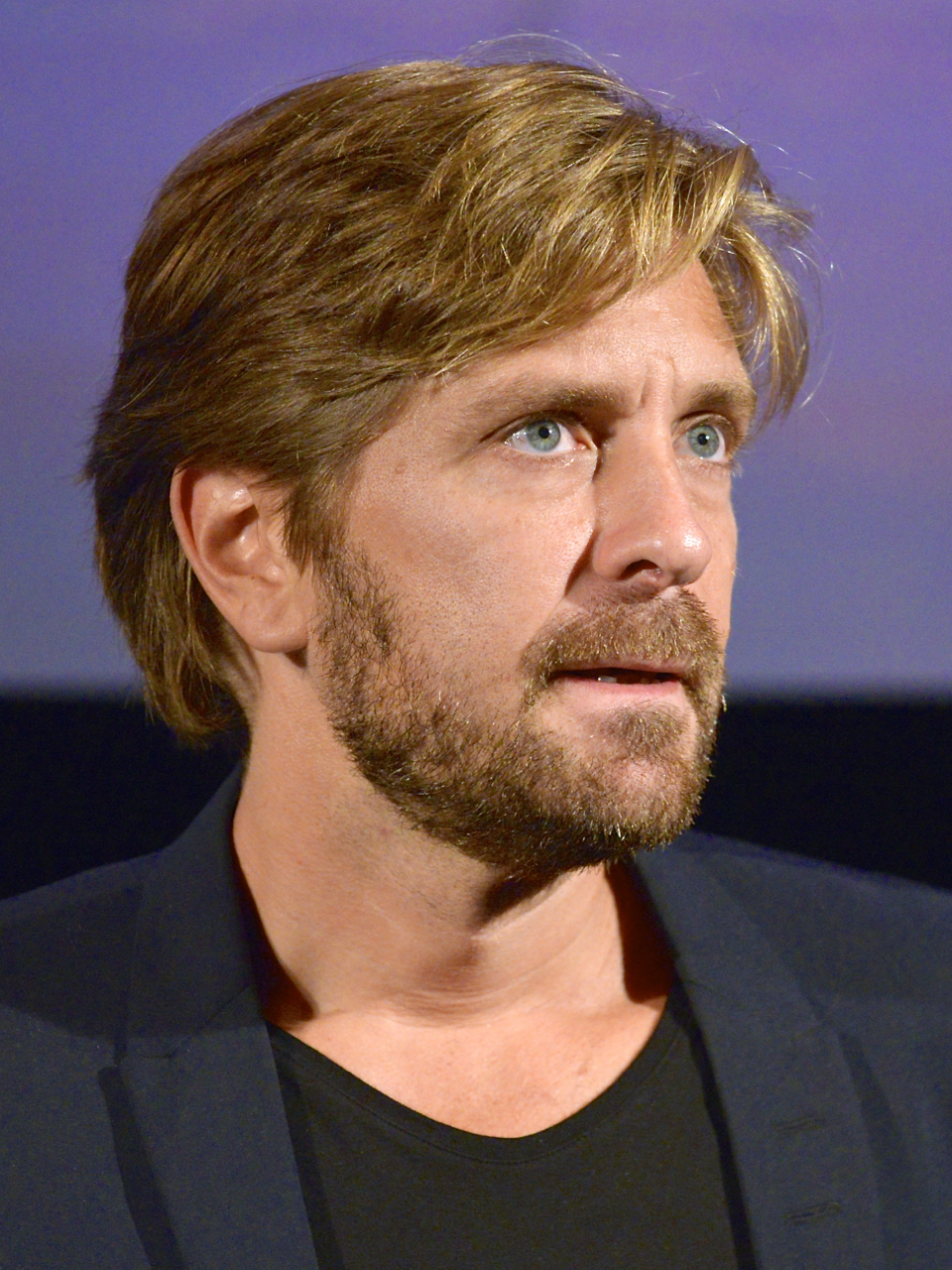
Ruben Östlund, Best Director winner

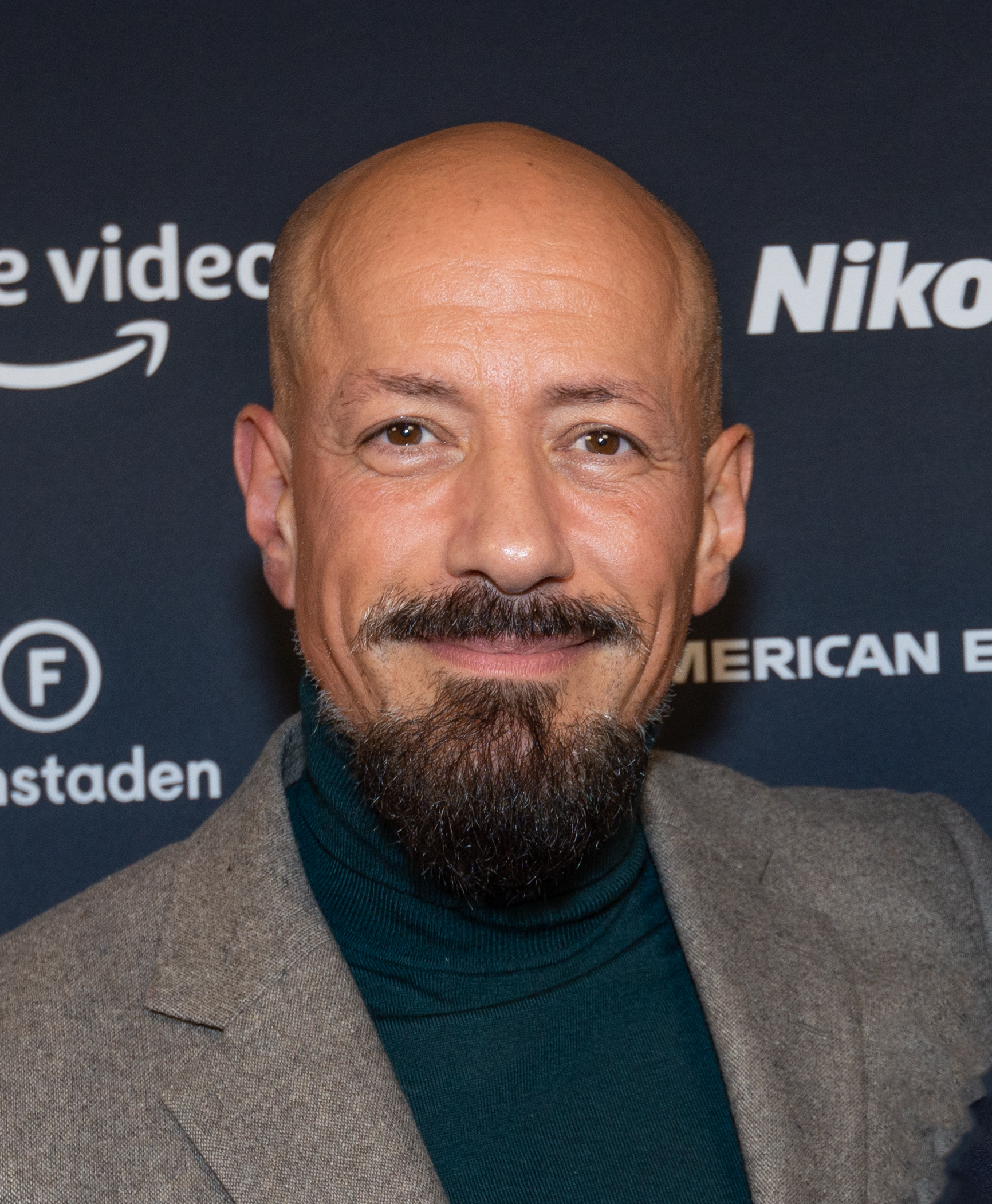
Tarik Saleh, Best Screenplay winner

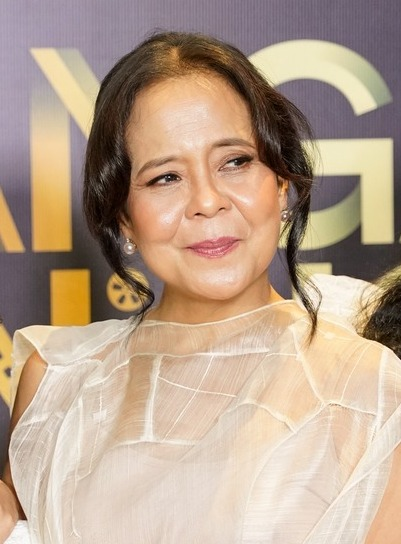
Dolly de Leon, Best Actress in a Supporting Role winner

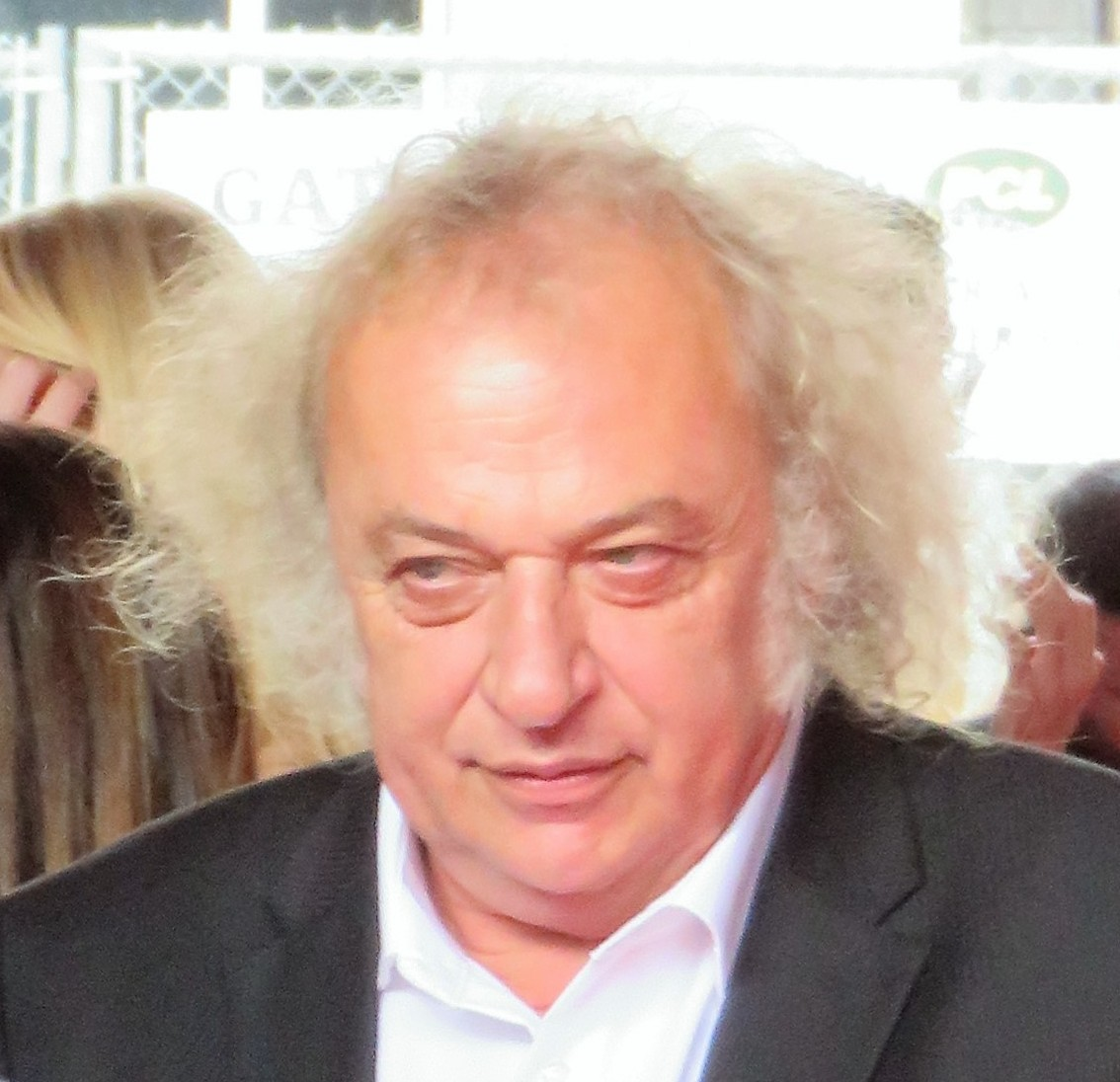
Zlatko Buric, Best Actor in a Supporting Role winner

The majority of the nominees for the 58th Guldbagge Awards were announced on 15 December 2022.

However, the finalists for the Guldbagge Audience Award were announced on 9 January 2023, whereas the Guldbagge Honorary Award and Gullspiran have no nominees, and the recipients of these awards were revealed along with the other winners at the gala.

Winners are listed first and highlighted in boldface.

**Best Film**: **Triangle of Sadness – Erik Hemmendorff and Philippe Bober**; Boy from Heaven – Kristina Åberg and Fredrik Zander; Comedy Queen – Anna Anthony and Rebecka Lafrenz; Historjá – Stygn för Sápmi – Pelle Nilsson and Mattias Nohrborg; I Am Zlatan – Fredrik Heinig, Frida Bargo and Mattias Nohrborg	**Best Director**: **Ruben Östlund – Triangle of Sadness**; Sanna Lenken – Comedy Queen; Tarik Saleh – Boy from Heaven; Jens Sjögren – I Am Zlatan
**Best Actress in a Leading Role**: **Sigrid Johnson – Comedy Queen**; Bahar Pars – Maya Nilo (Laura); Vera Vitali – Länge leve Bonusfamiljen; Katia Winter – The Year I Started Masturbating	**Best Actor in a Leading Role**: **Granit Rushiti – I Am Zlatan**; Tawfeek Barhom – Boy from Heaven; Oscar Töringe – Comedy Queen; Sven Wollter – Dag för dag
**Best Actress in a Supporting Role**: **Dolly de Leon – Triangle of Sadness**; Marika Lindström – Burn All My Letters; Liv Mjönes – Tack för senast; Carla Sehn – Stammisar	**Best Actor in a Supporting Role**: **Zlatko Burić – Triangle of Sadness**; Håkan Bengtsson – I Am Zlatan; Fares Fares – Boy from Heaven; Sten Ljunggren – Burn All My Letters
**Best Screenplay**: **Tarik Saleh – Boy from Heaven**; David Lagercrantz and Jakob Beckman – I Am Zlatan; Lovisa Sirén and Peter Modestij – Maya Nilo (Laura); Ruben Östlund – Triangle of Sadness	**Best Cinematography**: **Jonas Alarik – Black Crab**; Simon Pramsten – Comedy Queen; Stellan Runge – Burn All My Letters
**Best Editing**: **Åsa Mossberg and Line Schou – Döttrar**; Theis Schmidt – Boy from Heaven; Fredrik Morheden and Crazy Pictures – UFO Sweden	**Best Costume Design**: **Sofie Krunegård – Triangle of Sadness**; Denise Östholm – Boy from Heaven; Ingrid Sjögren – Burn All My Letters
**Best Sound Design**: **Ted Krotkiewski – All of Our Heartbeats Are Connected Through Exploding Stars**; Johan Johnson – Historjá – Stygn för Sápmi; Fredrik Jonsäter – I Am Zlatan	**Best Makeup and Hair**: **Stefanie Gredig – Triangle of Sadness**; Eva von Bahr – Burn All My Letters; Eglė Mikalauskaitė-Gricienė – Hilma
**Best Original Score**: **Eirik Havnes – Historjá – Stygn för Sápmi**; Irya Gmeyner and Martin Hederos – Comedy Queen; Lisa Montan – LasseMajas Detektivbyrå – Skorpionens gåta	**Best Set Design**: **Linda Janson – Black Crab**; Josefin Åsberg – Burn All My Letters; Josefin Åsberg – Triangle of Sadness
**Best Visual Effects**: **Simon Sandin – Black Crab**; Peter Hjorth, Peter Toggeth Karlsson and Ludwig Källén – Triangle of Sadness; Jacob Danell and Crazy Pictures – UFO Sweden	**Best Documentary Feature**: **Historjá – Stygn för Sápmi – Thomas Jackson**; Döttrar – Jenifer Malmqvist; Nelly & Nadine – Magnus Gertten; The Scars of Ali Boulala – Max Eriksson
**Best Short Film**: **Little to Big – Ellen Fiske and Ellinor Hallin**; Dansa min docka – Jasmijn Kooijman; Historien om Bodri – Stina Wirsén	**Audience Award**: **Feed – Johannes Persson**; I Am Zlatan – Jens Sjögren; UFO Sweden – Crazy Pictures
**Honorary Award**: **Björn Gustafson**	**Gullspiran**: **Sanna Lenken**

=== Films with multiple nominations and awards ===
Films with multiple nominations
Nominations	Film
9	Triangle of Sadness
7	Boy from Heaven
7	I Am Zlatan
6	Burn All My Letters
6	Comedy Queen
4	Historjá – Stitches for Sápmi
3	Black Crab
3	UFO Sweden
2	Döttrar
2	Maya Nilo (Laura)

Films with multiple wins
Wins	Film
6	Triangle of Sadness
3	Black Crab
2	Historjá – Stitches for Sápmi
