= Claes Fahlander =

Swedish physicist

- Born: 21 January 1948 (age 78); Gothenburg, Sweden
- Education: Uppsala University
- Scientific career
- Fields: Physics
- Workplaces: Lund University

Claes Fahlander (born 21 January 1948 in Gothenburg) is a Swedish physicist. As of May 2025, he is Professor Emeritus, Particle and Nuclear Physics, at Lund University.

After completing studies at Gävle University College in 1967, he attended Uppsala University, where he obtained his bachelor's degree in mathematics and physics in 1972. He became a Ph.D. in nuclear physics in 1977, and a teacher in 1982. Between 1979 and 1982 he worked at the Australian National University in Canberra, and in the following decade at Uppsala University. During a 1995 to 1997 sabbatical, he was a researcher at the Laboratori Nazionali di Legnaro in Italy, and on 1 July 1996 he succeeded Hans Ryde as professor of Cosmic and Subatomic Physics at Department of Physics at Lund University.

Fahlanders’ research has focused on studies of the shape of the atomic nucleus, its core patterns and electromagnetic properties, as well as forces between protons and neutrons in nuclear nuclei. In 2016, Fahlanders and his team verified the discovery of element 115, which had previously been discovered in Dubna, Russia in 2003.

Fahlander was elected as a member of the Royal Physiographic Society in Lund in 1998 and as a member of the Royal Swedish Academy of Sciences in 2006.
