= Comedy Queen =

2022 film by Sanna Lenken

- Directed by: Sanna Lenken
- Written by: Linn Gottfridsson
- Based on: Comedy Queen by Jenny Jägerfeld
- Produced by: Anna Anthony; Rebecka Lafrenz
- Starring: Sigrid Johnson; Oscar Töringe; Ellen Taure
- Cinematography: Simon Pramsten
- Edited by: Andreas Nilsson
- Music by: Irya Gmeyner; Martin Hederos
- Production companies: FLX; SF Studios
- Distributed by: SF Studios
- Release dates: 10 February 2022 (Berlinale); 11 February 2022 (Sweden)
- Running time: 93 minutes
- Country: Sweden
- Language: Swedish

Comedy Queen is a 2022 Swedish comedy film directed by Sanna Lenken and written by Linn Gottfridsson based on the novel of the same name by Jenny Jägerfeld. The film follows Sasha, a 13-year-old girl who has an ambition to become a stand up comedian as her way of healing from grief.

The film had its world premiere at the 72nd Berlin International Film Festival where it won the Crystal Bear for Generation Kplus. It also was nominated for six categories at the 58th Guldbagge Awards, winning one for Best Actress in a Leading Role for Sigrid Johnson.

== Cast ==
- Sigrid Johnson as Sasha
- Oscar Töringe as Abbe
- Ellen Taure as Märta
- Anna Bjelkerud as grandmother
- Iggy Malmborg as Ossie

== Release ==
The film had its world premiere at the 72nd Berlin International Film Festival on 10 February 2022. It was released in Swedish theatres a day after. During its run, it was also screened at several other international film festivals, such as Zlín, München, Giffoni, Motovun, among others.

== Accolades ==
Award	Date	Category	Recipient	Result	Ref.
Berlin International Film Festival	10–20 February 2022	Crystal Bear for Best Film – Generation Kplus	Sanna Lenken	Won	
European Film Awards	10 December 2022	European Film Academy Young Audience Award	Sanna Lenken	Nominated	
Guldbagge Awards	23 January 2023	Best Film	Anna Anthony and Rebecka Lafrenz	Nominated	
Guldbagge Awards	23 January 2023	Best Director	Sanna Lenken	Nominated	
Guldbagge Awards	23 January 2023	Best Actress in a Leading Role	Sigrid Johnson	Won	
Guldbagge Awards	23 January 2023	Best Actor in a Leading Role	Oscar Töringe	Nominated	
Guldbagge Awards	23 January 2023	Best Cinematography	Simon Pramsten	Nominated	
Guldbagge Awards	23 January 2023	Best Original Score	Irya Gmeyner and Martin Hederos	Nominated	
