= I Am Zlatan =

2021 film by Jens Sjögren

- Swedish: Jag är Zlatan
- Directed by: Jens Sjögren
- Written by: David Lagercrantz; Jakob Beckman
- Based on: I Am Zlatan Ibrahimović by Zlatan Ibrahimović and David Lagercrantz
- Produced by: Fredrik Heinig; Frida Bargo; Mattias Nohrborg
- Starring: Granit Rushiti; Dominic Andersson Bajraktati; Cedomir Glisovic
- Production companies: B-Reel Films; Nordisk Film; Film i Väst; Film i Skåne; SVT
- Distributed by: Nordisk Film
- Release dates: 21 October 2021 (Rome); 18 March 2022 (Sweden)
- Running time: 100 minutes
- Countries: Sweden; Denmark; Netherlands
- Languages: Swedish; English

I Am Zlatan (Swedish: Jag är Zlatan) is a 2021 biographical sports film about Swedish footballer Zlatan Ibrahimović based on the autobiography I Am Zlatan Ibrahimović which he co-wrote with David Lagercrantz. It was directed by Jens Sjögren and written by Lagercrantz with Jakob Beckman.

The film had its world premiere at the Rome Film Festival on 21 October 2021. It was nominated for seven categories at the 58th Guldbagge Awards, including Best Film. It won one award, Best Actor in a Leading Role for Granit Rushiti for his portrayal of 17-year-old Ibrahimović.

== Cast ==
- Granit Rushiti as 17-year-old Zlatan Ibrahimović
- Dominic Andersson Bajraktari as 11-year-old Zlatan Ibrahimović
- Cedomir Glisovic as Sefik Ibrahimovic
- Emmanuele Aita as Mino Raiola
- Håkan Bengtsson as Nils-Åke
- Arend Brandligt as Hugo Borst
- Merima Dizdarevic as Jurka Gravic
- Linda Haziri as Sanela

== Release ==
The film had its world premiere at the 16th Rome Film Festival on 21 October 2021. It was theatrically released in Italy on 11 November 2021. It garnered 125,974 spectators in its opening weekend, therefore had the "largest opening for a non-Italian European film during the COVID-19 pandemic".

The film was originally planned to have a theatrical release in Sweden on 10 September 2021, but was postponed several times due to the COVID-19 pandemic. It was ultimately released on 18 March 2022.

== Accolades ==
Award	Date	Category	Recipient	Result	Ref.
Guldbagge Awards	23 January 2023	Best Film	Fredrik Heinig, Frida Bargo and Mattias Nohrborg	Nominated	
Guldbagge Awards	23 January 2023	Best Director	Jens Sjögren	Nominated	
Guldbagge Awards	23 January 2023	Best Actor in a Leading Role	Granit Rushiti	Won	
Guldbagge Awards	23 January 2023	Best Actor in a Supporting Role	Håkan Bengtsson	Nominated	
Guldbagge Awards	23 January 2023	Best Screenplay	David Lagercrantz and Jakob Beckman	Nominated	
Guldbagge Awards	23 January 2023	Best Sound Design	Fredrik Jonsäter	Nominated	
Guldbagge Awards	23 January 2023	Audience Award	I Am Zlatan	Nominated	
