= Present absentee =

Legally dispossessed Palestinian internal refugees

Present absentees (Arabic: الغائبون الحاضرون) are Arab internally displaced persons (IDPs) who fled or were expelled from their homes in Mandatory Palestine during the 1947–1949 Palestine war but remained within the area that became the state of Israel.

In 1950, 46,000 out of the 156,000 Israeli Arabs in Israel were considered present absentees. According to 2015 estimates from Palestinian NGO BADIL, there are 384,200 IDPs in Israel and 334,600 IDPs in the Palestinian territories.

IDPs are not permitted to live in the homes they formerly lived in, even if they were in the same area as their home, the property still exists, and they can show that they own it. They are regarded as absent by the Israeli government because they were absent from their homes on a particular day, even if they did not intend to leave them for more than a few days, and even if they left involuntarily. The community carries out an annual March of Return to their former villages.

== IDPs in Israel ==
If the definition is restricted to those displaced in the 1948 war and its immediate aftermath and their descendants, some 274,000 Arab citizens of Israel – or one in four in Israel – are internally displaced.

The Internal Displacement Monitoring Centre estimated in 2007 that 150,000–420,000 internally displaced persons were living in Israel. The vast majority are Muslim (90%) and some 10% are Christian. There are no Druze among them "since no Druze village was destroyed in the 1948 war and no Druze left their settlements permanently."

Organizations defending the rights of Arab citizens of Israel also generally include the 110,000 Bedouin forced to move in a closed area under military rule in the Negev in 1949 in their estimates of internally displaced Palestinians. Other internally displaced persons included in these counts are those who were displaced by ongoing home demolitions enacted against unlicensed structures or in unrecognized villages. Estimates based on this broader definition place the total population of IDPs at anywhere between 250,000 and 420,000 people.

=== Present absentees ===
In 1950, the United Nations Relief and Works Agency for Palestine Refugees in the Near East (UNRWA) estimated that 46,000 of the 156,000 Palestinians who remained inside the borders demarcated as Israel by the 1949 Armistice Agreements were internally displaced refugees.

As it was for most other Palestinian refugees, the homes and properties of internally displaced Palestinians were placed under the control of a government body, the Custodian of Absentees' Property via legislation that includes the 1948 Emergency Regulation Concerning Absentee Property (a temporary measure) and the 1950 Absentee Property Law.

Unlike Palestinian refugees, the internally displaced Palestinians and others who remained inside what became Israel were made citizens by the Citizenship Law of July 1952. That same year Israel requested that UNRWA transfer responsibility for registering and caring for internally displaced persons to Israel and basic humanitarian assistance was provided to the internally displaced for a time.

Military administrative rule (1948–1966) restricted the movement of Arab citizens of Israel, and it combined with the Absentees' Property Laws to prevent internally displaced citizens from physically returning to their properties to reclaim their homes. According to the Absentees' Property Laws, "absentees" are non-Jewish residents of Palestine who had left their usual places of residence for any place inside or outside the country after the adoption of the partition of Palestine resolution by the UN. Under these laws, "absentee" property owners were required to prove their "presence" in order to gain recognition of their ownership rights by the Israeli government. However, all ownership rights of "absentees" belong to the government-appointed Custodian of Absentee Property, and any person including the "absentee" owner himself found occupying, building, or being "present" on such properties would be violating the law and risk expulsion and demolition.

Some villagers like those of Ghassibiya, Bir'im and Iqrit made petitions to the Israeli High Court to have their property rights recognized which were upheld in the 1950s, but they were physically prevented from reclaiming their properties by military administrative authorities who refused to abide by the court rulings and declared the villages closed military zones.

Because most internally displaced Arab citizens of Israel were counted as absent, even though present inside the Israeli state, they are also commonly referred to as present absentees.

=== Present-day ===
Today the internally displaced Bedouins and their descendants live in 39–46 unrecognized villages in the Negev and the Galilee, while the remaining internally displaced Arab citizens live in some 80 towns and villages in the Galilee such as Ein Hawd. There is also the village of Ein Rafa near Jerusalem.

Half of the populations in the two largest Arab towns in Israel, Nazareth and Umm al-Fahm, are made up of internally displaced persons from neighbouring towns and villages destroyed in 1948.

== IDPs in Palestine ==
The Internal Displacement Monitoring Centre estimated in July 2015 that there are at least 263,500 IDPs in Occupied Palestine.

== Research on the internal refugees ==
A few books focus on Arab internal refugees in Israel and internally displaced Palestinians across the Green Line.

In 1991, Israeli writer and peace activist David Grossman conducted several interviews with Palestinian citizens of Israel. These were published in a book called in Hebrew: נוכחים נפקדים, romanized: Nokhekhim Nifkadim, lit. 'Absent Presentees'. The English version was titled Sleeping on a Wire: Conversations with Palestinians in Israel.

As Nur Masalha puts it in his introduction: "Acquiring the paradoxical title of present absentees, the internally displaced had their property and homes taken by the state, making them refugees and exiles within their own homeland." The book uses oral history and interviews with internal refugees to examine Palestinian identity and memory, indigenous rights, international protection, the right of return, and a just solution in Palestine/Israel.

== Bibliography ==
- Davis, Uri (1997). Citizenship and the state: a comparative study of citizenship legislation in Israel, Jordan, Palestine, Syria and Lebanon. Ithaca Press. ISBN 9780863722189.
- Kassim, Anis F.; Mansour, C. (2002). The Palestine Yearbook of International Law 2000-2001. Martinus Nijhoff Publishers. ISBN 9789041118172.

== See also ==
- Land and Property laws in Israel
- Catch-22 (logic)
- Ein Hod
- Ghassibiya
- Bir'im
- Iqrit
- Lajjun
- Suba, Jerusalem
- Ein Rafa
- List of Arab villages in Israel populated with Internally Displaced Palestinians
- Depopulated Palestinian locations in Israel
