= Mina Azarian =

Swedish actress

Mina Azarian (born 25 September 1959 in Iran) is a Swedish actress. Azarian is best known for her role as Shaisteh in the Swedish TV series Tre kronor.

== Filmography ==
- Enkronan (1987)
- Beck – Lockpojken (TV series, 1997)
- Tre kronor (TV series, 1998–1999)
- Före stormen (2000)
- Mellan himmel och hästben (2002)
- Kissed by Winter (2005)
- Labyrint (TV series, 2007)
- Blå ögon (English Blue Eyes, TV series, 2004–2005)
- Eternal Summer (in Swedish: Odödliga) (2015)
- Vårdgården (TV series, 2016)
- Bride Price vs. Democracy (2016)
- Modus (TV Series, 2017)
- Uppsalakidnappningen (2018)
- JerryMaya's Detective Agency: The Secret of the Train Robber (2020)
- Måste gitt - Serien (TV Series, 2020)
- Sjukt (TV Series, 2021)
