= I'm Glad You're Dead Now =

2025 short film directed by Tawfeek Barhom

- International promotional poster
- Directed by: Tawfeek Barhom
- Written by: Tawfeek Barhom
- Produced by: Tawfeek Barhom; Stelios Cotionis; Akis Polizos
- Starring: Tawfeek Barhom; Ashraf Barhom
- Cinematography: Giorgos Valsamis
- Edited by: Lambis Haralambidis
- Music by: Andy Shortwave
- Production companies: Foss Productions; Kidam
- Release date: 21 May 2025 (Cannes)
- Running time: 14 minutes
- Countries: Palestine; France; Greece
- Language: Arabic

I'm Glad You're Dead Now is a 2025 drama short film written, co-produced, and directed by and starring Tawfeek Barhom. A co-production between Palestine, France and Greece, it follows brothers Reda and Abu Rashid (played respectively by Tawfeek Barhom and Ashraf Barhom (no relation)) who confront buried secrets from their past when they return to the island where they were born and raised.

The film had its world premiere at the Short Films competition of the 2025 Cannes Film Festival on 21 May, where it won the Short Film Palme d'Or.

== Cast ==
- Tawfeek Barhom as Reda Rashid
- Ashraf Barhom as Abu Rashid

== Release ==
The film premiered at the 2025 Cannes Film Festival, where it was the winner of the Short Film Palme d'Or.

Following its Cannes premiere, Joaquin Phoenix and Rooney Mara later joined the film as executive producers.

== Accolades ==
Since its release, the film has been selected in various festivals around the world:

| Year | Festivals | Award/Category | Status |
|---|---|---|---|
| 2025 | Cannes Film Festival | Short Film Palme d'Or | Won |
| 2025 | Toronto International Film Festival | Best Short Film | Nominated |
| 2025 | Athens International Film Festival | Best Director Award | Won |
