= Dubna, Russia =

Dubna (Russian: Дубна) is the name of several inhabited localities in Russia.

Urban localities

- Dubna, a town in Moscow Oblast
- Dubna, Dubensky District, Tula Oblast, a work settlement in Dubensky District of Tula Oblast

Rural localities

- Dubna, Kaluga Oblast, a village in Ulyanovsky District of Kaluga Oblast
- Dubna, Chekhovsky District, Moscow Oblast, a selo in Stremilovskoye Rural Settlement of Chekhovsky District of Moscow Oblast
- Dubna, Kolomensky District, Moscow Oblast, a village in Provodnikovskoye Rural Settlement of Kolomensky District of Moscow Oblast
- Dubna, Belyovsky District, Tula Oblast, a village in Slobodskoy Rural Okrug of Belyovsky District of Tula Oblast
- Dubna, Vladimir Oblast, a village in Alexandrovsky District of Vladimir Oblast
