= Population displacements in Israel after 1948 =

Population shifts in Israel after 1948 refers to the movement of Jewish and Arab populations in the wake of Israeli independence and the outbreak of the 1948 War. Arab villagers who resettled in other locations in Israel after 1948 are often referred to as internally displaced Palestinians. Many fled during the war but later returned to their homes. The Palestinians say that Israelis drove them from out while Israel says most left of their own accord. From 1948 to 1951, mass immigration nearly doubled Israel's Jewish population.

== Arab population shifts ==
- Ein Rafa – populated by Palestinians from Suba now Tzova.
- Ein Hawd – populated by Palestinians from Ein Hod.
- Ramla – populated by some Palestinians from Ashdod.
- Shfaram – populated by Palestinians from the Galilee.
- Nazareth –More than half the population is made up of internal refugees, some of them Christian Palestinians from Safed, Baysan and Tiberias.
- Jish – Some of the Population came from the Christian Palestinian villages of Iqrit and Kafr Bir'im.
- Rameh – Some of the Population came from the Christian Palestinian villages of Iqrit.
- Harish – In 1996 about 70 Arabs were relocated from Ramle.

== Jewish population shifts ==
- Gush Etzion – comprised four Jewish villages established south of Jerusalem in the 1920s. The populations of Kfar Etzion, Massu'ot Yitzhak, Ein Tzurim and Revadim were displaced.
- Beit Eshel
- Beit Yosef
- Hartuv – destroyed and rebuilt after the war as Moshav Naham
- Kfar Uria – destroyed and rebuilt after the war
- Mishmar HaYarden
- Nirim – destroyed and rebuilt after the war in another location
- Nitzanim – destroyed and rebuilt after the war in another location
- Atarot
- Beit HaArava
- Kalia
- Neve Yaakov
- Gush Katif
- Migron

== See also ==
- Depopulated Palestinian locations in Israel
- List of villages depopulated during the Arab–Israeli conflict
