= Gunnar Wetterberg =

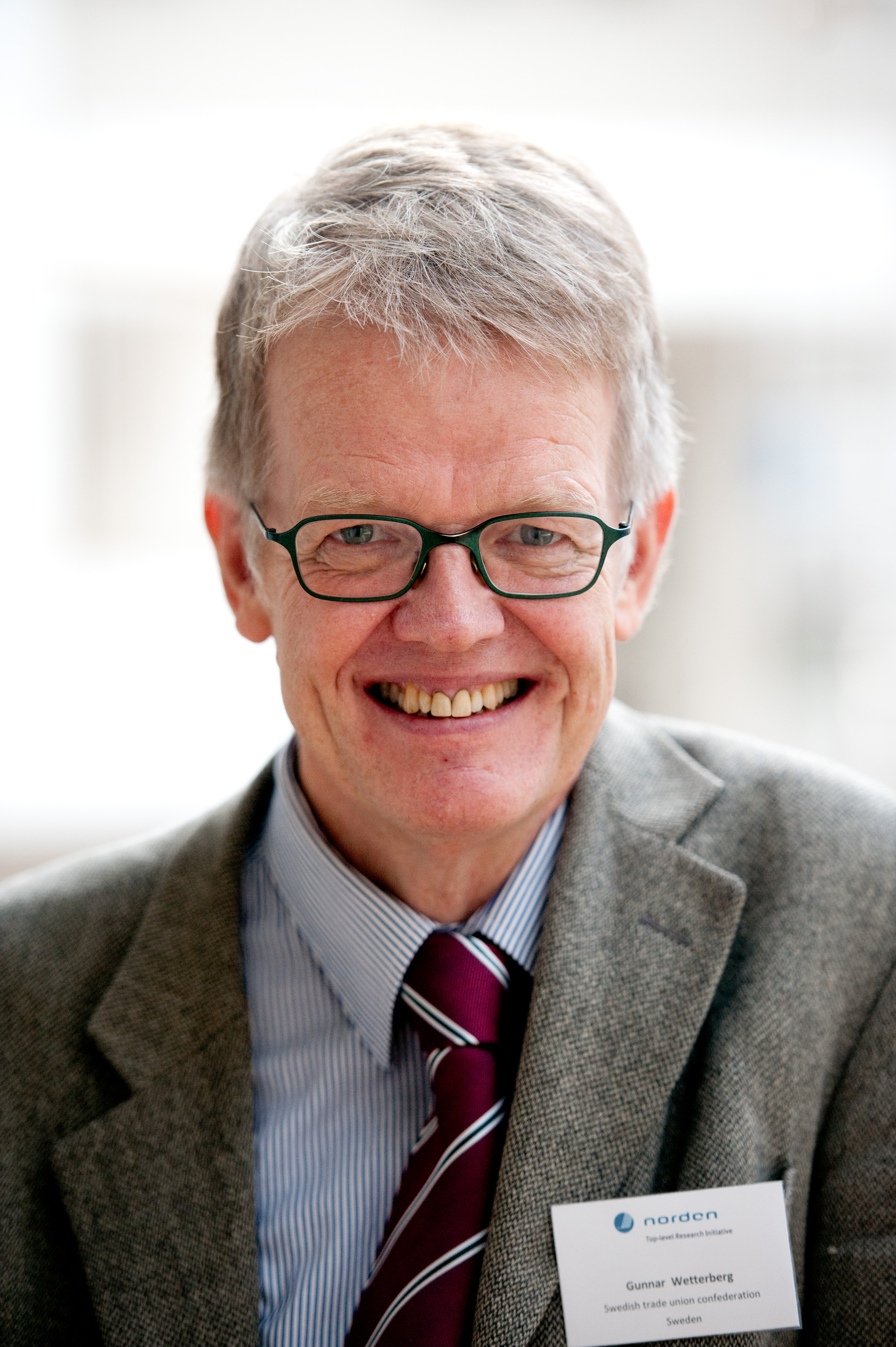
- Gunnar Wetterberg in 2010
- Born: Per Gunnar Wetterberg; 18 January 1953 (age 73); Malmö, Sweden

Per Gunnar Wetterberg (born 18 January 1953) is a Swedish author and historian.

Between 1999 and 2013, he was Sacos CEO for social policies. Since 2010, he is a freelancing writer for Expressen. He has authored several books and has in later years appeared on several television shows for SVT. He is also a board member of Sveriges Radio since 2013, and as well on the board of Lund University since 2017. Gunnar Westerberg was in the early 1960s, a board member of SECO, he studied at Lund University.

He studied history but ended his studies in 1975 to start working at the Foreign office. He has also worked at the National Swedish Accounting and Audit Bureau (Riksrevisionsverket), finance department having worked with the department of public economy and structure between 1992 and 1995. He is part of the panel of expert on the SVT show Fråga Lund; he has along with Parisa Amiri won two seasons of the SVT show På spåret.

== Bibliography ==
- Det nya samhället. Om den offentliga sektorns möjligheter, Tiden 1991
- Historien upprepar sig aldrig, SNS förlag 1994
- Kommunerna, SNS förlag 1997
- Nästa Sverige, Norstedts 1998
- Kanslern. Axel Oxenstierna i sin tid. Del 1-2, Atlantis 2002
- Levande 1600-tal. Essäer, Atlantis 2003
- Arbetet - välfärdens grundval, SNS förlag 2004
- Den kommunala självstyrelsen, SNS Pocketbibliotek 2004
- Från tolv till ett. Arvid Horn – 1664–1742 (Atlantis 2006
- Efter fyrtiotalisterna, Kommunlitteratur 2008
- Pengarna & makten. Riksbankens historia, Sveriges riksbank i samarbete med Atlantis 2009
- Alkoholen, samhället och arbetslivet, SNS förlag 2009
- Axel Oxenstierna. Makten och klokskapen, Atlantis 2010
- Nils Edén, Bonniers 2010
- Förbundsstaten Norden, Nordiska Rådet 2010
- Kurvans kraft. En bok om befolkningsfrågan, Weylers, 2011
- Wallenberg. Ett familjeimperium, Bonniers, 2013
- Skånes historia I. 11500 f.Kr. - 1375 e.Kr., Bonniers, 2016
- Medelklassens guldägg. Från SPP till Alecta 1917-2017, Dialogos, 2016
- Skånes historia II. 1376-1720, Bonniers, 2017
- Skånes historia III. 1720-2017, Bonniers, 2017
- Träd. En vandring i den svenska skogen, Bonniers, 2018
- Ingenjörerna, Bonniers, 2020
- Prästerna, Bonniers, 2022
- ERICSSON AB, 150 Years Anniversary Book, 2026
