= Breaking Surface =

- Directed by: Joachim Hedén
- Written by: Joachim Hedén
- Produced by: Julia Gebauer; Jonas Sörensson
- Starring: Moa Gammel Ginsburg; Madeleine Martin
- Cinematography: Anna Patarakina; Eric Börjeson
- Edited by: Fredrik Morheden
- Music by: Patrick Kirst
- Production companies: Screen Flanders; Umedia; Way Feature Films; Film i Skåne; Filmfond Nord; Wegge Films
- Distributed by: Doppelgänger Releasing
- Release dates: October 2020 (Nightstream); December 9, 2020 (Theatrical)
- Running time: 82 minutes
- Countries: Sweden; Norway; Belgium
- Languages: Swedish; Norwegian

Breaking Surface is a 2020 Swedish Norwegian Belgian survival thriller drama film written and directed by Joachim Hedén and starring Moa Gammel Ginsburg and Madeleine Martin.

== Plot ==
Breaking Surface is a thrilling Swedish survival drama that centers on the harrowing ordeal of two half-sisters, Ida and Tuva, during a winter diving trip in Norway. Shortly after they dive into a remote fjord, a rockslide traps Tuva underwater. With limited air and the clock ticking, Ida must summon all her courage and resourcefulness to rescue her sister. As the situation grows increasingly dire, the film explores the themes of sisterhood, survival, and the relentless human spirit in the face of nature's unforgiving power.

== Cast ==
- Moa Gammel Ginsburg as Ida
  - Ima Jenny Hallberg as young Ida
- Madeleine Martin as Tuva
  - Ingrid Pettersen as young Tuva
- Trine Wiggen as Anne
- Jitse Buitink as Dive instructor
- Alessio Barreto as Tanker captain
- Remi Alashkar as Tanker captain's assistant
- Lena Hope as Woman with puncture

== Production ==
The film was shot in Belgium, Strömstad, Lofoten and Gothenburg.

== Release ==
The film premiered at the virtual Nightstream Film Festival in October 2020.

== Reception ==
The film has a 100% rating on Rotten Tomatoes based on seven reviews. Richard Whittaker of The Austin Chronicle awarded the film three stars out of five. Alex Saveliev of Film Threat rated the film a 7 out of 10. Meagan Navarro of Bloody Disgusting awarded the film four skulls out of five.

Peter Martin of Screen Anarchy gave the film a positive review and wrote that it "consistently surprises as it develops into a gripping story of survival."

== Remake ==
The film was remade in 2023 in the English language titled The Dive.

== See also ==
- 47 Meters Down
