= Madeleine Martin (Swedish actress) =

Swedish actress

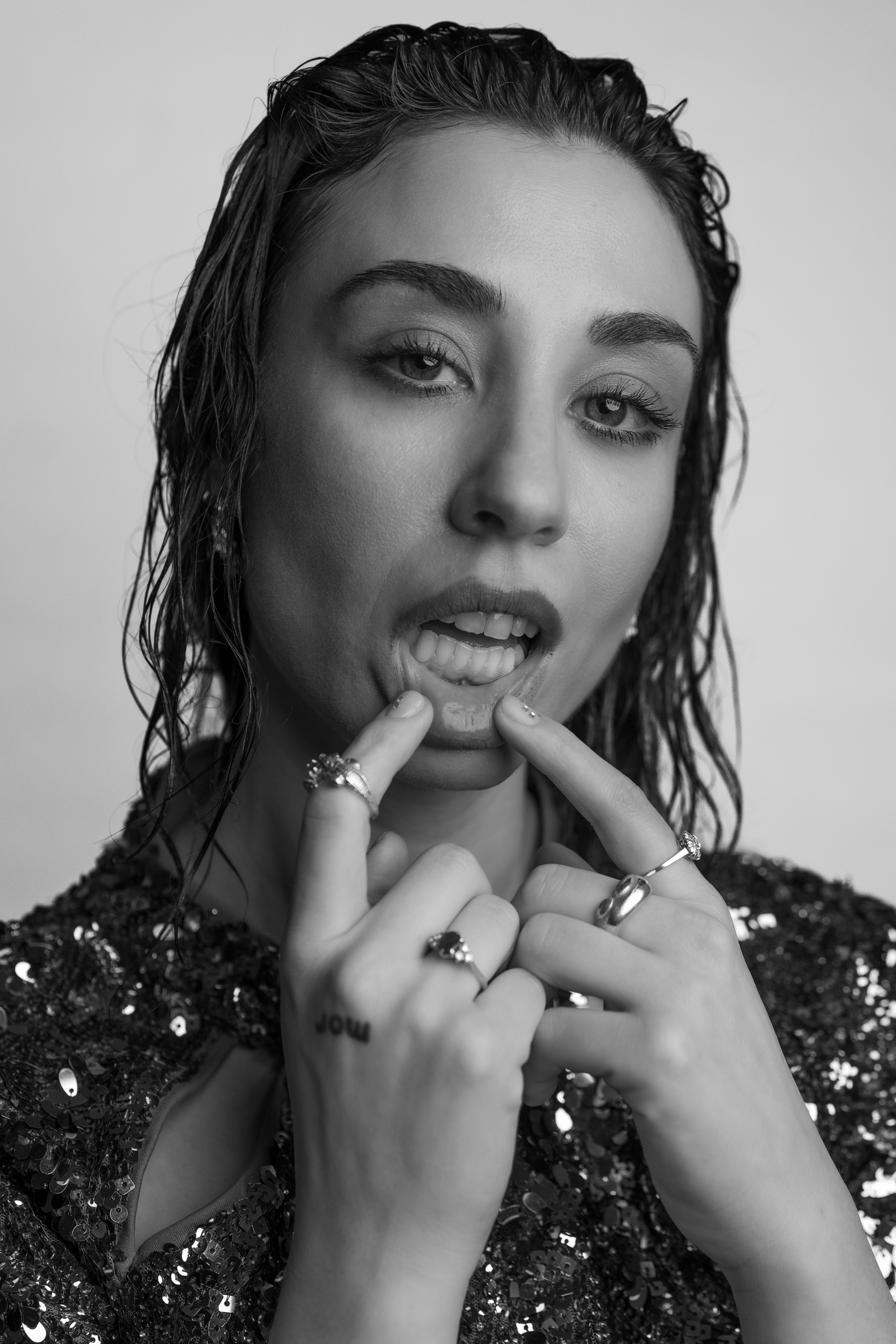
- Madeleine Martin in February 2025, shot by Sean Lewthwaite.
- Born: Madeleine Minou Martin; August 20, 1991 (age 34); Gothenburg, Sweden
- Occupation: Actress
- Years active: 2009–present

Madeleine Minou Martin (born 20 August 1991, in Gothenburg) is a Swedish actress.

== Biography ==
In fall 2009, Martin starred as Cleo in Sveriges Television's Web series Riverside. Since then, she has starred in the short film The Art of Breaking Up, and in the film Studio Sex, which is one of the many films about the character Annika Bengtzon, in which she portrayed the bartender Patricia. Martin has a role in the film Easy Money II: Hard to Kill (2012), in which she portrayed the character Nadja. She reprised the role in the sequel Easy Money III: Life Deluxe (2013). In 2014, she portrayed the character Fatima in Sveriges Television's Christmas calendar Piratskattens hemlighet. In 2024, she played the title role in the crime drama, Jana: Marked for Life.

Madeleine Martin is sister to actor and director Philip Martin.

== Filmography ==
=== Film ===
Year	Title	Role	Notes
2012	Studio Sex	Patricia	
2012	Easy Money II: Hard to Kill	Nadja	
2013	Easy Money III: Life Deluxe	Nadja	
2013	Studentfesten	Sanna	
2015	Eternal Summer	Em	
2017	A Hustler's Diary	Nathalie Vallsten	
2020	Breaking Surface	Tuva	
2022	Tack för senast	Tessan	

=== Television ===
Year	Title	Role	Notes
2009	Riverside	Cleo	
2014	Welcome to Sweden	Girl in café	
2014	Piratskattens hemlighet	Fatima	Sveriges Television's Christmas calendar
2018	Sjukt Oklar	Vera	SVT
2021	Dystopia	Tess	
2024	Jana: Marked for Life	Jana Berzelius	

=== Music video ===
Year	Title	Role	Notes
2014	Addicted to You	Waitress Girl	Song by Avicii.
