= Sten von Friesen =

- Born: Sten von Friesen; 18 March 1907; Uppsala, Sweden
- Died: September 9, 1996 (aged 89); Lund, Sweden
- Education: Uppsala University
- Known for: Participation in Fråga Lund
- Scientific career
- Fields: Physics
- Workplaces: University of Lund

Sten von Friesen (March 18, 1907, Uppsala; September 9, 1996) was a Swedish physicist who was most known for having participated in the Swedish hit show Fråga Lund.

== Biography ==
Sten von Friesen was born in Uppsala in 1907, and his father was the Swedish linguist Otto von Friesen. He was awarded his Doctor of Philosophy in 1935 at Uppsala University for his research led by Manne Siegbahn on the measurement of wavelengths in the elements X-ray spectrum. von Friesen moved to the newly established Nobel Institute for Physics in Stockholm in 1937 along Siegbahn. Together they started the construction of Sweden's first cyclotron, but von Friesen was mobilized at the Finnish border after the outbreak of World War II shortly after the completion of the cyclotron.

von Friesen became a professor at the Department of Physics at Lund University in 1948, and held the post until his retirement in 1972 when was succeeded by Hans Ryde. As a professor he continued his research on nuclear physics, and he was in charge when Lund University received its first particle accelerator. One of the highlights of his research happened when he and his team could show that the presence of elements in the Milky Way is the same as it is in the distant galaxies.

For a wider public, he became known through his participation in the TV program Fråga Lund in the 1960s and 1970s, where he was one of six scientists in the Panel who answered questions from the audience. In addition, he became a member of the Royal Swedish Academy of Sciences in 1964. He is buried at Uppsala Old Cemetery in the same tomb as the father.
