= Fråga Lund =

1962 Swedish TV format

- Genre: Popular education, science, entertainment
- Presented by: Jan-Öjvind Swahn Philip Sandblom; Bertil Svensson; Gunnel Werner Kristian Luuk
- Starring: Jan-Öjvind Swahn Gerhard Bendz; Sten von Friesen; David H. Ingvar; Carl H. Lindroth; Jörgen Weibull; Birger Bergh; Bertram Broberg; Göran Burenhult; Ulf Cervin; Torbjörn Fagerström; Carl-Erik Fröberg; Göran Hermerén; Bodil Jönsson; Arne Melander; Gustaf Rudebeck; Göran Rystad; Bengt Sigurd; Sven Tägil; Lotta Westerhäll; Henrik Widegren; Jessica Abbott; Gunnar Wetterberg; Gabriella Stenberg Wieser Armita Golkar
- Country of origin: Sweden
- Original language: Swedish

Production
- Production locations: Malmö (1962); Lund
- Production companies: SVT Malmö; Nexico (2016-present)

Original release
- Network: Sveriges Television; SVT 1 (2016 - present)
- Release: 1962 – present

Fråga Lund (English: "Ask Lund"; Lund being a well-known Swedish university town) is a Swedish television format where professors and other academics sits in a panel, in front of an audience, answering scientific questions. The first show was broadcast in 1962 and have since then existed in many iterations. The latest iteration started in August 2016 with Kristian Luuk as host.

== History ==
=== 1962 - 1981 ===
Fråga Lund was first broadcast in the fall of 1962. It was then Malmö's foremost contribution to Swedish television since Bialitt ended the year before. The first show was recorded in a studio on Baltzarsgatan (in Malmö, not Lund) and the expert panel consisted of:

- Jan-Öjvind Swahn, host of Fråga Lund (also docent, later professor of ethnology)
- Gerhard Bendz, docent, later professor of classical languages)
- Sten von Friesen, professor of physics
- David H. Ingvar, docent, later professor of neurology
- Carl H. Lindroth, professor of entomology
- Jörgen Weibull, docent, later professor of history

Later the show would be actually recorded in Lund, for example from Akademiska Föreningen and Stadshallen. During the spring of 1979 one episode was recorded in Helsinki.

The show would to a large extent be associated with Jan-Öjvind Swahn who was the host for almost two decades. Except for a few episodes that was hosted by the university's rector magnificus Philip Sandblom.

The last with Jan-Öjvind Swahn as host was the Easter special that was broadcast April 18, 1981. After that the show was dropped.

=== 1993 - 2000 ===
After about a decade the show returned on February 27, 1993. This new version was broadcast from Grand Hotel in Lund and was hosted by Bertil Svensson, who also was the producer of the earlier incarnation.

The new version had three seasons, whereof the latter two would be broadcast during late fall so that the last episode could be watched during the Christmas holiday.

After two special episodes shown at the sheer Thursday and Pentecost 1996, the show was dropped.

An additional season was made in year 2000 with Gunnel Werner as host. This version was a live broadcast direct from Malmö during the Saturday afternoons during both the spring and fall. It was also broadcast live on internet with a web-exclusive part after the TV-portion had ended.

=== 2016 - Present ===
During the fall of 2016 a new show was created bearing the name Fråga Lund. This new version had many similarities to the older iterations, but tried this time to reach a broader audience. It was recorded at Sparbanken Skåne Arena in Lund with Kristian Luuk as host.

The show was recorded infron of a live audience on the 3, 6, 7, and 8 June. It was produced by the production company Nexiko for Sveriges Television. The panel, not all being from Lund, consists mostly of:

- Henrik Widegren, Doctor of Medicine.
- Jessica Abbott, evolutionary biologist.
- Gunnar Wetterberg, historian and honorary doctor.
- Gabriella Stenberg Wieser, space physicist at the Swedish Institute of Space Physics in Kiruna.
- Armita Golkar, Doctor of Psychology at the Karolinska Institute in Stockholm.

==== Reception ====
The show got both negative and positive critic by reviewers.

Three academics with a past at Lund University wrote a text that was critic to the show and told that the original concept of Fråga Lund was to help the university to fulfill its Third Task, namely to spread its knowledge to the common Swede. In a radio interview the authors added that the new format of the show banalised the concept of knowledged and underestimated the audience's ability to understand complex scientific concepts with the help of researchers and academics.

SVT's program purchaser answered that the program had been well received, even by the audience. That the happy address with a twinkle in the eye and with variety made the program both attractive and reached a wide audience. That questions that sounds trivial can produce intricate answers. The program manager dismissed the critique which he ment "often had been as simplistic and superficial as the program itself was accused of being", with that program had many viewers. He also mention that he is surprised that 1.1 million viewers (about 11 percent of the then current Swedish population) choose a program where five intelligent academics explained and discuss contemporary research.

==== Rewards ====
On January 2, 2019 the show was awarded with Educator of the Year 2018 by The Swedish Skeptics' Association. Their motivation was:

"The program is awarded this award because with the help of researchers and other experts in different subject areas in an easily accessible way answering viewer's questions about research and science. 'Fråga Lund' capture many viewers of all ages who might not otherwise have been interested in science and research. Through its format with a mix of facts and playfulness, one attracts another – and considerably larger – audience than the purely fact-based science programs that are also included the public service. Thanks to 'Fråga Lund', the public has the opportunity to take part in current research without being at expert level themselves."

== See also ==
- Boston Tea Party (TV series)
