= Jana: Marked for Life =

Swedish crime drama TV series

- Also known as: Jana: Märkta för livet
- Genre: Crime drama, thriller
- Created by: Felix Herngren; Henrik Björn
- Based on: Märkta för livet by Emelie Schepp
- Written by: Maria Karlsson; Daniel Sawka; Charlotte Lesche
- Directed by: Felix Herngren; Henrik Björn
- Starring: Madeleine Martin; Pernilla August; Johan Ulveson; August Wittgenstein; Suzanne Reuter; Moa Gammel; Fredrik Hallgren; Sigrid Johnson; Peshang Rad
- Music by: Erik Lewander, Iggy Strange-Dahl
- Country of origin: Sweden
- Original languages: Swedish, English
- No. of seasons: 1
- No. of episodes: 6

Production
- Executive producers: Erik Barmack; Elin Kvist; Martin Rea; Lotta Dolk
- Producer: Sussan Treschow
- Production companies: FLX; Viaplay

Original release
- Network: Amazon Prime Video
- Release: 6 March 2024 (SBS on Demand, Australia); 19 April 2024 (Amazon Prime, Europe)

Jana: Marked for Life (Swedish: Jana: Märkta för livet) is a Swedish television crime drama and thriller developed by Viaplay. It appeared on Viaplay's Australian partners SBS On Demand from 6 March 2024. It was initially scheduled for streaming in Europe by Viaplay in late 2023 but was cancelled owing to the company's downsizing. Its European debut was postponed to 19 April 2024 after Prime Video Nordics picked up the series.

The six-part series is based on Emelie Schepp's novel Märkta för livet (2013, English: Marked for Life), which features the protagonist Jana Berzelius, a public prosecutor. The TV series was co-created and directed by Felix Herngren and Henrik Björn. The screenwriters are Maria Karlsson, Daniel Sawka and Charlotte Lesche. Filming began in early 2023 in Norrköping and Stockholm. Jana is portrayed by Madeleine Martin, her adoptive parents are Margaretha (Pernilla August) and Karl (Johan Ulveson), with August Wittgenstein as lead prosecutor Peer.

== Premise ==
After completing her qualifications, Jana is appointed assistant public prosecutor in Norrköping against the advice of her father, Karl. At Karl's retirement celebration, Hans visits Jana with concerns about a recent immigrant child, Victoria. Hans is later found murdered. When his murderer – a pre-teen child – is also found killed, Jana recognises a Θ scar symbol on the boy's neck, the Greek letter theta, which signifies Thanatos. She has a similar scar on her nape, Κ for Ker. Jana cannot recall much of her early childhood but determines that these murders are linked to her past. She becomes part of Hans and Thanatos's murder investigations alongside Peer and police officers Mia and Henrik. Jana tries to understand her childhood better while facing discouragement from both Karl and the psychologist she saw as a child, Monica. Jana takes in her adoptive sister, Jojo, who has drug-related debt issues. Victoria goes missing after being visited by another child-soldier, Phobos.

Hans was searching for missing shipping containers and Jana succeeds in finding one, which was dumped in 1996. It contains 12 human skeletons – evidence of trafficking. Jana realises this was how she had been transported to Sweden. Jana re-encounters fellow former child-soldier Hades, who warns her against continuing her search. Mia confronts one of the trafficking network's leaders, Leo, who starts shooting. Henrik is seriously injured and Leo is arrested. However Leo pleads self-defence and while being transferred to prison he is killed by Phobos, abetted by Hades. Jana finds the island where she was trained by Baba and attempts to rescue Victoria (renamed Lyssa). Baba captures Jana and, with Hades, tortures her. They are surrounded by Baba's child-soldiers. Although injured, Jana escapes with Victoria while Baba is killed by Hades. The other child-soldiers are found by police except Hades and Phobos, who elude them.

== Cast and characters ==
=== Main cast ===
- Madeleine Martin as Jana Berzelius (previously: Ker): has Κ scar on her nape, former child-soldier, adopted by Karl and Margaretha at 11 years old. Becomes assistant public prosecutor, joins Hans's murder investigation
- Pernilla August as Margaretha Berzelius: Jana's adoptive mother, displays signs of dementia
- Johan Ulveson as Karl Berzelius: retired chief public prosecutor, Jana's adoptive father
- August Wittgenstein as Peer Bruckner: lead prosecutor, heading Hans's murder investigation, Jana's supervisor, Brazilian jiu-jitsu (BJJ) practitioner
- Suzanne Reuter as Monica Grandkvist: forensic psychiatrist, child psychologist, treated Jana
- Moa Gammel as Mia Bolander: Violent Crimes Unit police officer, investigates Hans's murder
- Fredrik Hallgren as Henrik Levin: police officer, works with Mia
- Sigrid Johnson as Louise "Jojo" Berzelius: Jana's adoptive younger sister, she turns 17
- Peshang Rad as Hades a.k.a. Danilo Peña: former child soldier, Jana's contemporary, Baba's second-in-command

=== Additional cast ===
- Mahmut Suvakci as Amin Telmen: police officer
- Sukai Saine as Victoria (renamed Lyssa): child, human trafficking victim, escaped Baba, retaken by Phobos
- Inanna Kino as Unga Ker (English: Young Ker [Jana]): child soldier, contemporary with Hades
- Efe Özay as Unga Hades (English: Young Hades): child soldier, contemporary with Jana
- Matilda Gross as Phobos: child soldier-assassin, kidnaps Victoria
- Richard Forsgren as Torsten "Tord" Granath: chief prosecutor, Karl's successor, Peer and Jana's boss
- Anna Sise as Annelie Lindgren: forensic examiner
- Astrid Assefa as Karita: community care centre supervisor, looked after Victoria
- Mela Tesfazion as Emma Levin: Henrik's wife
- Isabelle Kyed as IT - Jasmine: police IT technician
- Robert Fohlin as Tomas Rydberg: harbour security officer, fights Jana and is killed by her
- Roman Aschberg as Thanatos: has Θ scar on his nape, masked child (10 to 12 years old) soldier-assassin, killed Hans but murdered soon after
- Asanda Kokkonen as Makda Abraham: 18 years old, asylum-seeker, Hans's lover
- Adam Stålhammar as Fabian/Fabbe: Jojo's drug dealer
- Gerhard Hoberstorfer as Hans Juhlén: head of the Migration Board, Kerstin's husband, murdered by Thanatos
- Mats Qviström as Jack Aspelin: retired marine surveyor, claimed container ship dropped two containers in 1996
- Elina Du Rietz as Kerstin Juhlén: Hans's wife
- Yoel Escanilla as Simas: worker at Björn's Freight, Leo's subordinate
- Thure Lindhardt as Leo Hansen: Danish criminal, part of people smuggling and money laundering network, uses child soldiers, works for Baba
- Zlatko Burić as Baba/Gavril Bolanaki: doomsday prepper, human trafficking network boss, trained young children to be killers, renamed each after Greek mythological figures and scarred them with relevant Greek letter
- Solomon Njie as Yusuf Abraham: Makda's older brother, murder suspect
- Kristoffer Stålbrand as Säkerhetspolis (English: Security Police): worked with Tomas

== Production ==
Jana: Marked for Life was developed by Viaplay and FLX based on Märkta för livet (2013), the first book in a four-part series, by Emelie Schepp, which introduces Jana Berzelius as a public prosecutor. Viaplay's adaptation was announced in September 2022.

The television series was co-created by Felix Herngren and Henrik Björn, who also directed it. The screenwriters are Maria Karlsson, Daniel Sawka and Charlotte Lesche. Filming began in early 2023 in Norrköping and Stockholm.

Viaplay scheduled it's six episodes for streaming in Europe from late 2023. However, Viaplay cancelled the series when the company downsized during mid-2023, and it was picked up by Prime Video Nordics.

== Episodes ==
No.	Title	Directed by	Written by	Original release date
1	"Episode 1" (Avsnitt 1)	Felix Herngren, Henrik Björn	Maria Karlsson, Daniel Sawka, Charlotte Lesche	6 March 2024
Victoria arrives into Norrköping harbour via a raft. People celebrate Karl's retirement. Jojo snorts white powder. Outside, Jana encounters Hans, who tries informing her of Victoria. Karl asks Hans to leave. At home, Hans goes to buy pizza. Karl's not pleased when Tord announces Jana's appointment as assistant prosecutor. Jana meets Peer, who brags of his jiujitsu prowess. Hans kisses Makda in his car. Margaretha confuses Jojo's birthday with Karl's celebration. Hans returns home but Kerstin's asleep. Thanatos stabs Karl and then chokes him to death. Jana collects drug-affected Jojo and takes her home. Jana joins Peer to attend Hans's corpse. Jana sees his folder is now empty. Mia scoffs at Jana claim about suspect's entry as the window's too small. Jana sees Hans's codes list. Jana tells Karl of Hans's murder. Karl warns that Jana's association with Hans makes her ineligible to investigate. Jana joins Peer's jiujitsu training. Jana takes Peer into a choke-hold; she has to be forced to release. CCTV image shows masked Thanatos running. Jana joins Mia and Henrik to meet Victoria. Victoria's arrival parallels Jana's experience. Peer alerts Jana: police found Thanatos's corpse. He has a Θ scar on his neck. Jana has flashbacks of her childhood.
2	"Episode 2" (Avsnitt 2)	Felix Herngren, Henrik Björn	Maria Karlsson, Daniel Sawka, Charlotte Lesche	6 March 2024
Jana's nightmare: masked person attacking Jojo. Jana visits Monica, who reveals Jana was medicated for serious psychological trauma. Monica refuses to show Jana's records. Forensics confirm that Thanatos killed Hans. A witness saw Karl with Makda. Peer allows Jana to question Victoria. Mia and Henrik learn that Hans was helping Makda's family gain residency. Yusuf sent threatening messages to Hans for his affair with Makda. Victoria draws dockside view for Jana. Peer reveals that Yusuf's knife's missing. Police team capture Yusuf at his girlfriend's place. Jana's Internet searches from Θ to Greek god Thanatos and masks, which match one worn by murderer, Thanatos. Jana funds Jojo's payment to Fabian, who bullies Jojo. Jana breaks Fabian's finger. Phobos enters Victoria's room. Mia blames Jana for Victoria's absence. Karita explains that Victoria left with Phobos. Makda recalls that Hans investigated trafficking while at harbour. Once there, Jana recognises images from Victoria's drawings. Jana asks Tomas for his logs. He counters that she should ask his boss. Jana crosses side fence. Mia informs Peer: Yusuf's not murderer; Victoria's absent. Jana overhears Tomas phoning Leo. Tomas chases Jana. Peer resists Mia's advances. Jana and Tomas fight; she kills him. Jana steals CCTV's hard drive.
3	"Episode 3" (Avsnitt 3)	Felix Herngren, Henrik Björn	Maria Karlsson, Daniel Sawka, Charlotte Lesche	6 March 2024
Jana's back is scarred from her child-soldier training. Jana steals Monica's DVD, which shows "Young" Ker remembering Hades. Monica convinces Ker that Hades is a dream character. Margaretha explains how they tried to reduce Jana's nightmares. Jana wants to confront her past not bury it behind medications and lies. Peer sends Jana to Annelie, who describes Tomas's corpse: killed by strangulation following violent fight. Säkerhetspolis recalls that Tomas smuggled contraband and sometimes argued with Hans. Mia notices container codes are same style as Hans's codes. Using those codes, Jana learns of missing container. Jojo discovers article citing Jack's observations. Tomas's last call was to an industrial site. Jana drives Karl's boat. Industrial workers do not recognise Tomas. Mia calls Tomas's number, which rings outside. Leo's Porsche drives away. Jack describes containers dumped from a ship in 1996 near Aspöja island. Jana surmises there might be corpses inside and orders a salvage boat. Peer berates Mia for tracking phone's owner without back up. Jana updates Peer on salvaging operation. Tord asks Peer to explain what's happening. A container has 12 human skeletons. At Jana's place, Peer almost kisses Jana but she recoils when he cradles her neck. Jojo arrives and Peer leaves.
4	"Episode 4" (Avsnitt 4)	Felix Herngren, Henrik Björn	Maria Karlsson, Daniel Sawka, Charlotte Lesche	6 March 2024
Jana takes Hades' knife; gives it to Annelie for analysis. Annelie: Jewellery indicates skeletons were from former Yugoslavia. Jana sees container's torn roof, which matches her nightmares. Jana accuses Monica of aggravated child abuse. Monica says Jana may have travelled in a container. Mia's distraught at losing Henrik's assistance due to his stress leave. Jana reneges on supporting Jojo at anti-drugs meeting. Annelie identifies Hades as Danilo. Karl describes Monica's hospitalisation after being hit by a truck. Jasmine delivers Hans's computer to Mia. Instead attending meeting, Jojo parties. Jana asks Danilo to help her stop child-soldiers. Danilo warns Jana to leave Sweden immediately or her whole family will be killed. Hans's emails show connections to Jana. Jana's barred from investigation. Jana takes case files home. Jojo invites her parents to her birthday. Harbour CCTV shows Björn's Freight vehicle appeared when Victoria went missing. Leo owned missing containers and drives a Porsche. Jana trails Simas, who takes box of files from Björn's Freight. Mia takes evidence about Leo to Peer, who will forward it to Tord. Simas arrives at Leo's home, removes more boxes. Jana searches Leo's home; Phobos approaches. Jana captures Phobos and places her in Jana's car boot.
5	"Episode 5" (Avsnitt 5)	Felix Herngren, Henrik Björn	Maria Karlsson, Daniel Sawka, Charlotte Lesche	6 March 2024
Jana brings struggling Phobos home, who head-butts Jana. When Jojo arrives Jana kicks her out. Police enter Leo's home to collect evidence. Jana leaves Phobos tied up to visit Monica, who explains that Phobos shoved her into the truck. Monica apologises for disbelieving Jana's stories of "Baba" training killer children. Tomas owned a marina at Vikbolandet. Mia asks for Peer's search warrant but he requires evidence of its illegalities. Uniform police investigate noise complaints. Jana tells Phobos to cooperate and they convince police to leave. Unauthorised, Mia goes after Leo. Henrik leaves for Vikbolandet. As Mia arrives, Simas burns files next to the Porsche. Leo exits behind Mia and shoots at her. Henrik rescues Mia but is shot by Leo. Squad arrests Leo. Peer informs Jana that they arrested Leo, believing him to be the network's boss. Leo claims self-defence when Mia shot at him, first. Jana remembers Leo from childhood. Jana tells Danilo of Leo's arrest and takes Danilo home. Phobos has left. Danilo tells Jana that "Baba's" organisation will retaliate. They must flee Sweden. As Leo's taken from the police station, he chats to Jana while Phobos stabs him dead. Jana chases Phobos. Phobos is collected by Hades.
6	"Episode 6" (Avsnitt 6)	Felix Herngren, Henrik Björn	Maria Karlsson, Daniel Sawka, Charlotte Lesche	6 March 2024
Jana tells Mia she asked about Victoria but Leo said nothing. Child-soldiers shear Victoria's hair. Hades confirms the island is where "Baba" had trained Jana. Later, Jana takes boat keys and travels to that island. Jasmine shows CCTV of Jana losing Phobos when Hades picks Phobos up. Police suspect Phobos of murdering Leo and search for Phobos, Hades and Jana. On the island, Jana releases Victoria from her cell. Jana recalls training as Ker with Hades. "Baba" and Hades capture and torture Jana. Mia finds Thanatos's Greek mask. "Baba" justifies preparation of child-soldiers. Peer and Mia learn Jana took boat keys. "Baba" leads Jana to an arena to fight Hades. Karl finds Jana's private investigations; he contacts Tord. Jana wins but lets Hades live. "Baba" shoots Jana and orders his "children" to kill Jana. Peer informs Amin and Mia that Jana's on Gavril's island. Hades kills "Baba"; lets Jana and Victoria leave. "Children" burn "Baba's" corpse. Hades and Phobos escape, before police arrive on island to collect "children". Jana's hospitalised; Karl apologises for disbelieving Jana. Victoria and parents reunited. Jana returns to work. Peer asks Jana about Hades; she claims not to recognise him. Hades and Phobos buy a house.

== Broadcast ==
The series was streamed on Viaplay's Australian partners, SBS On Demand from 6 March 2024. Prime Video previewed the series in March 2024 and streamed it from 19 April 2024.

BBC iPlayer bought Jana: Marked for Life in April 2024. The series was broadcast on BBC Four in the UK on 8 June 2024.
