= I Am Zlatan Ibrahimović =

2011 autobiography by Zlatan Ibrahimović

- Original Swedish edition
- Author: Zlatan Ibrahimović with David Lagercrantz
- Original title: Jag är Zlatan Ibrahimović
- Translator: Ruth Urbom
- Language: Swedish
- Subject: Autobiography
- Publisher: Albert Bonniers Förlag (Sweden), Penguin Books (UK)
- Publication date: 2011
- Publication place: Sweden
- English publication date: 2013
- Pages: 332
- ISBN: 978-9-100-12819-7; UK edition: ISBN 978-0-241-96683-9
- OCLC: 857923830
- LC Class: 2015304054 (translated edition)
- Followed by: Adrenaline
- Website: Albert Bonniers Förlag, Penguin Books

I Am Zlatan Ibrahimović (Swedish: Jag är Zlatan Ibrahimović) is an autobiography of the Swedish footballer Zlatan Ibrahimović, written alongside the Swedish author David Lagercrantz and first published in Swedish in 2011 by Albert Bonniers Förlag. The book was commercially successful, selling its first edition of 100,000 copies on its first day, and 800,000 by 2017. It was translated into other languages, including a 2013 English translation by Ruth Urbom which was published by Penguin Books. A film based on the book was released in Sweden in 2021, titled I Am Zlatan, directed by Jens Sjögren.

== Synopsis ==
Swedish footballer Zlatan Ibrahimović tells his life story, starting from his upbringing in Rosengård, a mostly immigrant area of the southern city of Malmö. His Bosniak father and Croat mother marry for residency permits and separate when he is two; his father suffers from alcohol abuse and trauma from his family's suffering in the ongoing Bosnian War, while his mother is at times violent. Segregated from mainstream Swedish society, he finds a way to integrate while a young footballer at Malmö FF, while remaining self-conscious of his differences.

In Ibrahimović's account of his one season at FC Barcelona (2009–10), he attacks manager Pep Guardiola, whom he considers indirect, cowardly and inflexible. He praises other managers from his career: Leo Beenhakker (AFC Ajax), Fabio Capello (Juventus) and José Mourinho (Inter Milan), as well as his agent Mino Raiola.

== Release ==
The full first edition of 100,000 copies sold out in Sweden within hours, a level of interest which was unprecedented for Albert Bonniers Förlag marketing manager Martin Ahlström. A further 100,000 copies were commissioned. It was estimated that by the end of the second edition, the book would have grossed 20 million Swedish kronor. Per the convention of authors taking 30% of the proceeds, Ibrahimović and Lagercrantz would have shared 6 million kronor between themselves.

By May 2012, the book had sold over 500,000 copies in Sweden. In Finland, a first edition of 5,200 copies sold out, with 5,000 being considered a bestseller for biographies. In Italy, where Ibrahimović was playing at the time, it sold 140,000 copies in two months, and 35,000 in Norway. It had also been published in the Netherlands, Denmark (straight to number one), Poland, Bosnia and Herzegovina, Croatia, Montenegro, Serbia and Slovenia, with editions scheduled for Hungary, Iceland and Japan.

By December 2017, the book had sold over 800,000 copies in Sweden. The book contributed to an increase in reading for young males in the country.

== Reception ==
=== From players ===
In the book, Ibrahimović complains about an unnamed "prima donna" teammate on the Sweden men's national football team, who would complain that they should train and play like his club, Arsenal. Freddie Ljungberg accused Ibrahimović of using gossip about him to sell a book: "Personally, if I have a problem with people I take it face to face. But clearly, everyone is different. He wrote a book instead".

=== From critics ===
Martina Montelius of Expressen noted how the book was a reflection of Ibrahimović's individualism and rarely commented on team spirit or playing for Sweden. In her view, the level of honesty was unusual for a Swedish sports autobiography, and more akin to British releases. She commented that the worst recollection of his childhood was not his juvenile delinquency or experiences of child neglect, but his lack of integration; at 13, he did not know who the Swedish 1994 FIFA World Cup semi-finalist Thomas Ravelli was, nor did he watch a Swedish film until he was 20.

Simon Kuper of the Financial Times called the book the best recent football autobiography. He likened its narrative to that of the novel Portnoy's Complaint by Philip Roth, in which protagonist Alex Portnoy is a Jewish-American in Newark, New Jersey in the 1930s and 1940s. Both grow up segregated from the mainstream culture, with impoverished and sometimes violent parents. The two protagonists are vaguely aware of warfare occurring in their ancestral country. At 17, both move away and try to integrate into the mainstream culture; both are enchanted by blonde women, but are self-conscious of their differences in speech and appearance.

In The Guardian, Richard Williams called the book possibly "most compelling autobiography ever to appear under a footballer's name". He contrasted the book to a recent release by Dennis Bergkamp; the two strikers had completely different upbringings, and endured completely different relationships with their coaches. Richard Herbert of The Independent described the book as "the most compelling autobiography football has known" and called for it to win the William Hill Sports Book of the Year.

The English translation was nominated for the 2013 William Hill Sports Book of the Year, losing to Doped, a book on doping in horse racing in the 1960s.

Lagercrantz received attention in 2015 when he told the Hay Festival that many of the quotes in the book were his own creations and were not told to him by Ibrahimović. He defended the practice by saying that due to the difference in spoken and written language, it was necessary to modify what had been told to him by the footballer.

== Film ==
In December 2017, Lagercrantz told Aftonbladet that there would be a film based on the book. Ibrahimović revealed the trailer for the film in July 2021, and it was released in Swedish cinemas that September.
