= Boy from Heaven =

2022 film by Tarik Saleh

- Swedish theatrical release poster
- Directed by: Tarik Saleh
- Written by: Tarik Saleh
- Produced by: Kristina Åberg; Fredrik Zander
- Starring: Tawfeek Barhom; Fares Fares; Mohammad Bakri; Makram Khoury; Mehdi Dehbi; Moe Ayoub; Sherwan Haji; Ahmed Lassaoui; Jalal Altawil; Ramzi Choukair
- Cinematography: Pierre Aïm
- Edited by: Theis Schmidt
- Music by: Krister Linder
- Production companies: Atmo; Memento; Bufo
- Distributed by: TriArt Film (Sweden); Memento (France); B-Plan Distribution (Finland)
- Release dates: 20 May 2022 (Cannes); 26 October 2022 (France); 18 November 2022 (Sweden); 6 April 2023 (Finland)
- Running time: 126 minutes
- Countries: Sweden; France; Finland
- Language: Arabic
- Box office: $4.9 million

Boy from Heaven (Arabic: صبي من الجنة, romanized: ṣabiyy min al Janna, also known as Cairo Conspiracy), is a 2022 political thriller film written and directed by Tarik Saleh. It follows poor fisherman Adam (Tawfeek Barhom), who, while studying at the prestigious Al-Azhar University, witnesses the political struggle to elect a Grand Imam. The film is a co-production between Sweden, France and Finland.

The film had its world premiere at the main competition of the 2022 Cannes Film Festival on 20 May, where it won the Best Screenplay award and the François Chalais Prize. It was selected as the Swedish entry for the Best International Feature Film at the 95th Academy Awards, but was not nominated.

== Plot ==
Adam, the son of a fisherman from a village near El Manzala, accepts an offer to study at the prestigious Al-Azhar University in Cairo, Egypt. Shortly after his arrival, the Grand Imam of al-Azhar suddenly dies and a power struggle to replace him ensues. The NSA (security service) strives to install sheikh Beblawi, but he has two competitors: neutral sheikh Negm, who is blind, and a Salafi sheikh Durani.

Adam makes friends with Zizu, who is an informer for Colonel Ibrahim from the NSA. Zizu is soon killed, and Adam tries to help solve his murder by working for Ibrahim. He infiltrates a group of extremists and gathers information about them, but he learns that they had no involvement with the murder. Once the extremists realize his role, they attempt to kill Adam, but Ibrahim stops them and forces their leader to quit his position as Durani's assistant and turn it over to Adam.

Sheikh Negm turns himself in to the NSA and claims that he killed Zizu. The NSA is forced to arrest him despite knowing that he is not guilty. While doing menial tasks for Durani, Adam discovers that he has an illegitimate child, which disqualifies him. Sheikh Beblawi is elected Grand Imam.

Ibrahim's superior, Sobhi, orders him to kill Adam, revealing that NSA murdered Zizu too. Ibrahim is shocked and tries to help Adam to escape, but he is captured. Sobhi attempts to pressure Adam into confessing that he murdered Zizu. Ibrahim too gets arrested, but he manages to persuade General Sakran to arrange a meeting between Adam and Negm: Negm knows about NSA's role in Zizu's murder and plans to reveal it to the media during the trial; Ibrahim thinks that Adam can persuade Negm to reconsider. Adam succeeds and is let go.

Adam returns to his home village wearing al-Azhar's signature turban. He thanks his village imam, but is unable to say what he has learnt at the university. In the final scene of the film he joins his father in the fishing boat.

== Cast ==
- Tawfeek Barhom as Adam
- Fares Fares as Ibrahim
- Mohammad Bakri as General Al Sakran
- Makram Khoury as Sheikh Negm
- Mehdi Dehbi as Zizo
- Moe Ayoub as Sobhy
- Sherwan Haji as Soliman
- Abduljabbar Alsuhili as Alasfour
- Ahmed Lassaoui as Raed
- Jalal Altawil as Sheikh Beblawi
- Ramzi Choukair as Sheikh Durani
- Yunus Albayrak as Sharia Teacher
- Mouloud Ayad as Nazim
- Okan Bozkuş as Student
- Youssef Salama Zeki as Biology Teacher
- Ayman Fathy as Soldier
- Amr Mosad as Harun

== Production ==
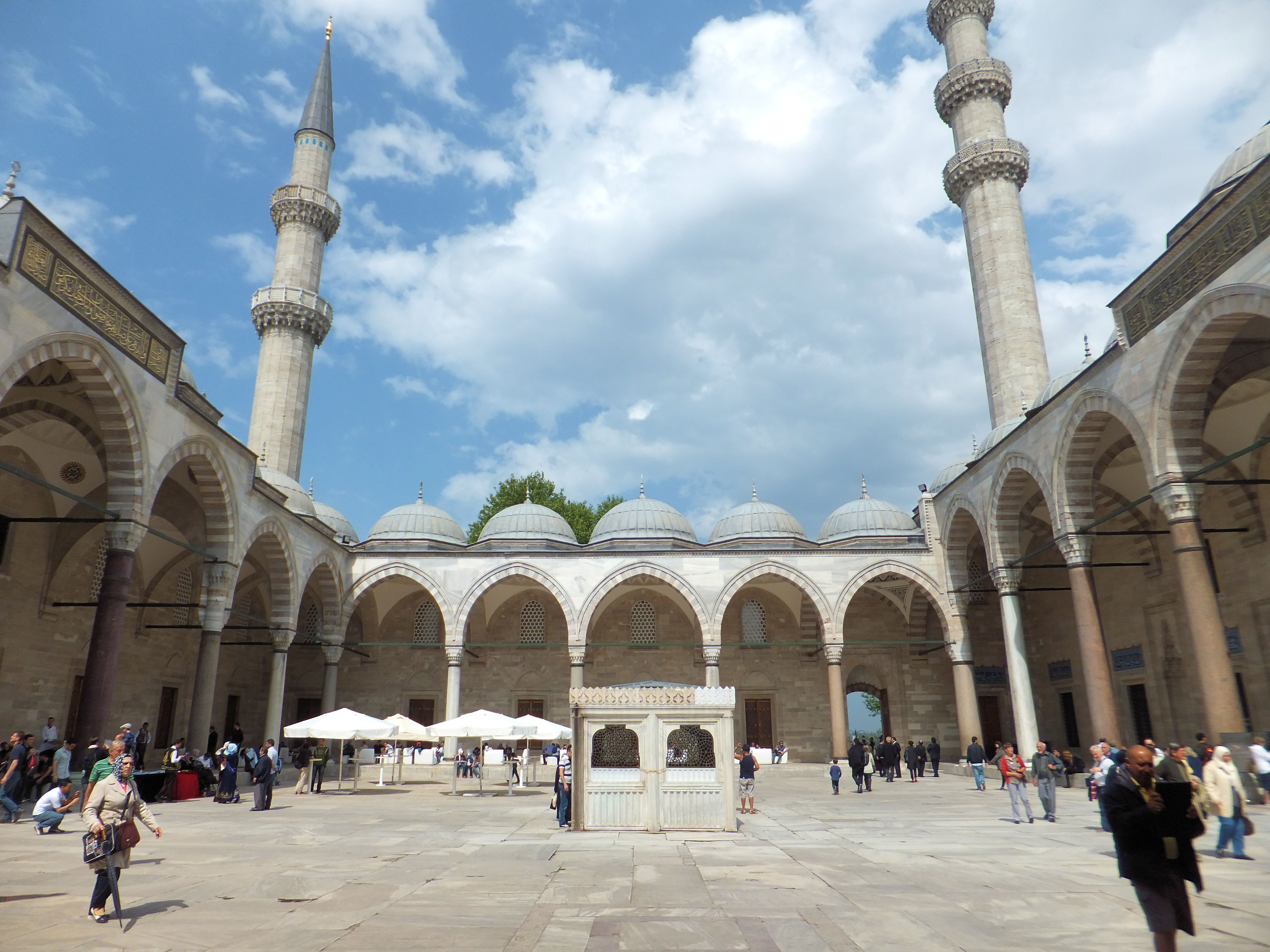
Courtyard of the Süleymaniye Mosque, Istanbul

The film was shot primarily at the Süleymaniye Mosque in Istanbul, Turkey.

== Release ==
The film had its world premiere on 20 May 2022 at the 75th Cannes Film Festival, where it was selected to compete for the Palme d'Or.

Memento Distribution released the film in France on 26 October 2022, under the title La Conspiration du Caire. The film opened the 2022 Stockholm International Film Festival on 9 November 2022. TriArt Film released the film in Sweden on 18 November 2022, under the title Boy from Heaven. B-Plan Distribution released the film in Finland on 6 April 2023, under the title Salaliitto Kairossa.

Samuel Goldwyn Films acquired North American rights to the film, theatrically releasing it in the US on 27 January 2023, under the title Cairo Conspiracy. Picturehouse Entertainment theatrically released the film in the UK and Ireland on 14 April 2023, also as Cairo Conspiracy. It was released in Australian theatres by Rialto Distribution on 4 May 2023, also as Cairo Conspiracy.

== Reception ==
=== Critical response ===
On Rotten Tomatoes, the film holds an approval rating of 85% based on 47 reviews, with an average rating of 7.4/10. The website's consensus reads, "Although it may not fully unlock the promise of its tension-rich setting and premise, Cairo Conspiracy's strong performances and sophisticated script offer solidly satisfying compensation". According to Metacritic, which assigned a weighted average score of 72 out of 100 based on 14 critics, the film received "generally favorable" reviews.

=== Accolades ===
The film was selected as the Swedish entry for the Best International Feature Film at the 95th Academy Awards, and made the December shortlist.

Award	Date of ceremony	Category	Recipient(s)	Result	Ref.
Cannes Film Festival	28 May 2022	Best Screenplay	Tarik Saleh	Won	
Cannes Film Festival	28 May 2022	François Chalais Prize	Tarik Saleh	Won	
Cannes Film Festival	28 May 2022	Palme d'Or	Tarik Saleh	Nominated	
César Awards	24 February 2023	Best Foreign Film	Boy from Heaven	Nominated	
Guldbagge Awards	23 January 2023	Best Screenplay	Tarik Saleh	Won	
Guldbagge Awards	23 January 2023	Best Film	Kristina Åberg, Fredrik Zander	Nominated	
Guldbagge Awards	23 January 2023	Best Director	Tarik Saleh	Nominated	
Guldbagge Awards	23 January 2023	Best Editing	Theis Schmidt	Nominated	
Guldbagge Awards	23 January 2023	Best Actor in a Leading Role	Tawfeek Barhom	Nominated	
Guldbagge Awards	23 January 2023	Best Actor in a Supporting Role	Fares Fares	Nominated	
Guldbagge Awards	23 January 2023	Best Costume Design	Denise Östholm	Nominated	
Lumière Awards	16 January 2023	Best International Co-Production	Boy from Heaven	Nominated	
Magritte Awards	4 March 2023	Best Supporting Actor	Mehdi Dehbi	Nominated	

== See also ==
- List of submissions to the 95th Academy Awards for Best International Feature Film
- List of Swedish submissions for the Academy Award for Best International Feature Film
