= The Way of the Wind =

- Directed by: Terrence Malick
- Written by: Terrence Malick
- Produced by: Josh Jeter
- Starring: Géza Röhrig; Matthias Schoenaerts; Mark Rylance; Ben Kingsley; Tawfeek Barhom; Björn Thors; Joseph Fiennes; Douglas Booth; Aidan Turner; Leila Hatami
- Cinematography: Jörg Widmer
- Edited by: Rehman Nizar Ali
- Music by: Eleni Karaindrou
- Production companies: Studio Babelsberg; Pistachio Pictures
- Countries: Germany; United Kingdom; United States
- Language: English

The Way of the Wind is an upcoming epic biblical drama film written and directed by Terrence Malick and produced by Josh Jeter. Starring Géza Röhrig as Jesus, the film retells his story. It also stars Matthias Schoenaerts as Saint Peter, Mark Rylance as Satan, Tawfeek Barhom as John the Baptist, Aidan Turner as Saint Andrew, Ben Kingsley, Joseph Fiennes and Douglas Booth.

== Premise ==
The Way of the Wind retells and chronicles several episodes in the life story of Jesus through several parables. A subplot revealed by Röhrig concerns Jesus not wanting Saint Peter, one of his disciples, to partake in a political movement to fight the Roman occupation. Jordan Raup of The Film Stage said there are no scenes of Jesus performing miracles, "making for a rather grounded approach". Mark Rylance, who plays Satan, said Satan has more dialogue than Jesus in scenes featuring the two.

== Cast ==
- Géza Röhrig as Jesus Christ
- Matthias Schoenaerts as Saint Peter
- Mark Rylance as Satan
- Ben Kingsley
- Tawfeek Barhom as John
- Björn Thors
- Joseph Fiennes
- Douglas Booth
- Aidan Turner as Saint Andrew
- Leila Hatami as Mary Magdalene
- Lorenzo Gioielli
- Philip Arditti as Hosea
- Nabil Elouahabi as Saint Stephen
- Con O'Neill as Enoch
- Joseph Mawle as Saul
- Karel Roden as Mamon
- Martin McCann as Marcellus
- Sarah-Sofie Boussnina as Claudia
- Laëtitia Eïdo as Anna
- Ali Suliman as Cleopas
- Shadi Mar'i as Asher
- Selim Bayraktar as Jonathan
- Ori Pfeffer as Ahaziah
- Selva Rasalingam as Jeroboam
- John Rhys-Davies as Uriah
- Sebastiano Filocamo as Prodigal Elder Brother
- Makram Khoury as Jonas
- Sarah Greene
- Mathieu Kassovitz
- Numan Acar
- Ioachim Ciobanu as Zealot
- Franz Rogowski
- Sofia Asir as Dinah
- Antonia Fotaras as Miriam

== Production ==
Reports began circulating in June 2019 that Terrence Malick had begun filming his next project, then known as The Last Planet, near Anzio, Italy. By July, filming was reportedly occurring in Iceland, with Ben Kingsley and Björn Thors reported to have been cast and present for filming. In September, Mark Rylance, Matthias Schoenaerts, Géza Röhrig, Joseph Fiennes, Douglas Booth and Aidan Turner were cast, with Rylance directly confirming the film and saying he would play four versions of Satan. John Rhys-Davies was also added to the cast. Joseph Mawle was added in October.

Mathieu Kassovitz told the French radio station RFM that Malick filmed an average of five hours per day, leading to 3,000 hours of footage by the end of filming. Editing commenced in 2019, immediately after filming ended. As of 2025, Malick was still editing the film.
