= Adrenaline (autobiography) =

2022 book Zlatan Ibrahimović and Luigi Garlando

- Original Italian edition
- Author: Zlatan Ibrahimovic and Luigi Garlando
- Original title: Adrenalina. My untold stories
- Language: Italian
- Publisher: Cairo
- Publication date: 2 December 2021
- Publication place: Italy
- ISBN: 9788830901988
- OCLC: 1360352275

Adrenaline: My Untold Stories (Italian: Adrenalina: My Untold Stories) is the second autobiography by the Swedish footballer Zlatan Ibrahimović, after I Am Zlatan Ibrahimović (2011). The book was written alongside La Gazzetta dello Sport journalist Luigi Garlando and first published in Italy in December 2021. The book has been translated into other languages, including an English version to be released by Penguin Books in 2022.

== Synopsis ==
Ibrahimović opens the book by saying "OK I give up. I'm forty years old. I'm a god but a god who ages". He describes the title of the book, adrenaline, as "the key word of my life". He reflects on his period at Manchester United, describing them as having a "small, closed mentality" despite their wealth and prestige; he alleges they docked one pound from his wages for drinking a juice from a hotel minibar. He considers Paris Saint-Germain to have lacked discipline, and says that he offered to replace Leonardo as their sporting director. Ibrahimović claims that his A.C. Milan teammate Hakan Çalhanoğlu exploited a tragedy to move to rivals Inter Milan, namely the opportunity opened up by Christian Eriksen's cardiac arrest in 2021; he considers both Çalhanoğlu and Ante Rebić to be players who can only play well with him on their team.

== Release ==
Adrenaline topped the bestsellers list in Italy in December 2021, ahead of releases by Ken Follett and Donato Carrisi. In the same month, it was released in Sweden by Albert Bonniers Förlag and topped the non-fiction charts ahead of a biography of deceased Swedish DJ Avicii.
