= The Dive (2023 film) =

2023 film by Max Erlenwein

- Release poster
- Directed by: Maximilian Erlenwein
- Screenplay by: Maximilian Erlenwein; Joachim Heden
- Based on: Breaking Surface by Joachim Hedén
- Produced by: Jonas Katzenstein; Maximilian Leo
- Starring: Louisa Krause; Sophie Lowe
- Cinematography: Frank Griebe
- Edited by: Philipp Thomas
- Music by: Volker Bertelmann; Raffael Seyfried
- Production companies: Augenschein Film; Falkun Films; Zweites Deutsches Fernsehen; Logical Content Ventures; Protagonist Pictures
- Distributed by: RLJE Films
- Release date: August 24, 2023 (Pigeon Shrine FrightFest)
- Running time: 91 minutes
- Countries: Germany; Malta
- Language: English

The Dive is a 2023 German Maltese thriller film written by Maximilian Erlenwein and Joachim Hedén, directed by Erlenwein and starring Louisa Krause and Sophie Lowe. It is a remake of Heden's 2020 Swedish film Breaking Surface.

== Plot ==
Sisters May and Drew go diving at a beautiful, remote location. May is struck by a rock during a landslide, leaving her trapped 28 meters below. With dangerously low levels of air and cold temperatures, it is up to Drew to fight for their lives.

== Cast ==
- Louisa Krause as May
  - Shire Richardson as young May
- Sophie Lowe as Drew
  - Stella Uhrig as young Drew
- David Scicluna as May and Drew's father

== Release ==
The film was released in the United Kingdom at Pigeon Shrine FrightFest on August 24, 2023. In the United States, RLJE Films released the film in theaters and on VOD and digital platforms on August 25, 2023.

== Reception ==
The film has a 62% rating on Rotten Tomatoes based on 34 reviews. Julian Roman of MovieWeb awarded the film three stars out of five. Joel Harley of Starburst awarded the film four stars out of five. Brian Tallerico of RogerEbert.com awarded the film two stars. Amber Wilkinson of Radio Times awarded the film four stars out of five. Jake Cunningham of Empire awarded the film three stars out of five.

Dennis Harvey of Variety gave the film a positive review and wrote, "While perhaps not quite striking enough in style or incident to leave a lasting impression, this very well-crafted remake (...) should particularly impress with its underwater photography on the big screen."

Peter Martin of Screen Anarchy also gave the film a positive review and wrote, "Keeping to a fleet running time helps, and the breathless pace becomes snappy and relentless thanks to the excellent performances by both Louisa Krause and Sophie Lowe, who fully inhabit their characters and make convincing siblings."

== See also ==
- 47 Meters Down
