= Eternal Summer (2015 film) =

- Directed by: Andreas Öhman
- Starring: Madeleine Martin; Filip Berg
- Release date: 21 August 2015
- Running time: 106 minutes
- Country: Sweden
- Language: Swedish

Eternal Summer (Swedish: Odödliga) is a 2015 Swedish drama film directed by Andreas Öhman.

== Synopsis ==
When Isak and Em meet one night in Stockholm, they set out on a road trip up to Luleå. Soon, the couple's money ends and they are forced to commit crimes in order to move forward. The crimes are becoming more serious and more violent as they go on. Eventually, they are followed by the police and the trip ends in a tragedy on the Kalix River (Kalixälven).

== Cast ==
- Madeleine Martin - Em
- Filip Berg - Isak
- Torkel Petersson - Lars, Isak's father
- Fanny Ketter - Felicia
- Mats Qviström - August, Em's father
- Mina Azarian - Em's mother
- Hedda Stiernstedt - Alexia
- Lars T. Johansson - The Hunter
