= Mino Raiola =

Italian-Dutch football agent (1967–2022)

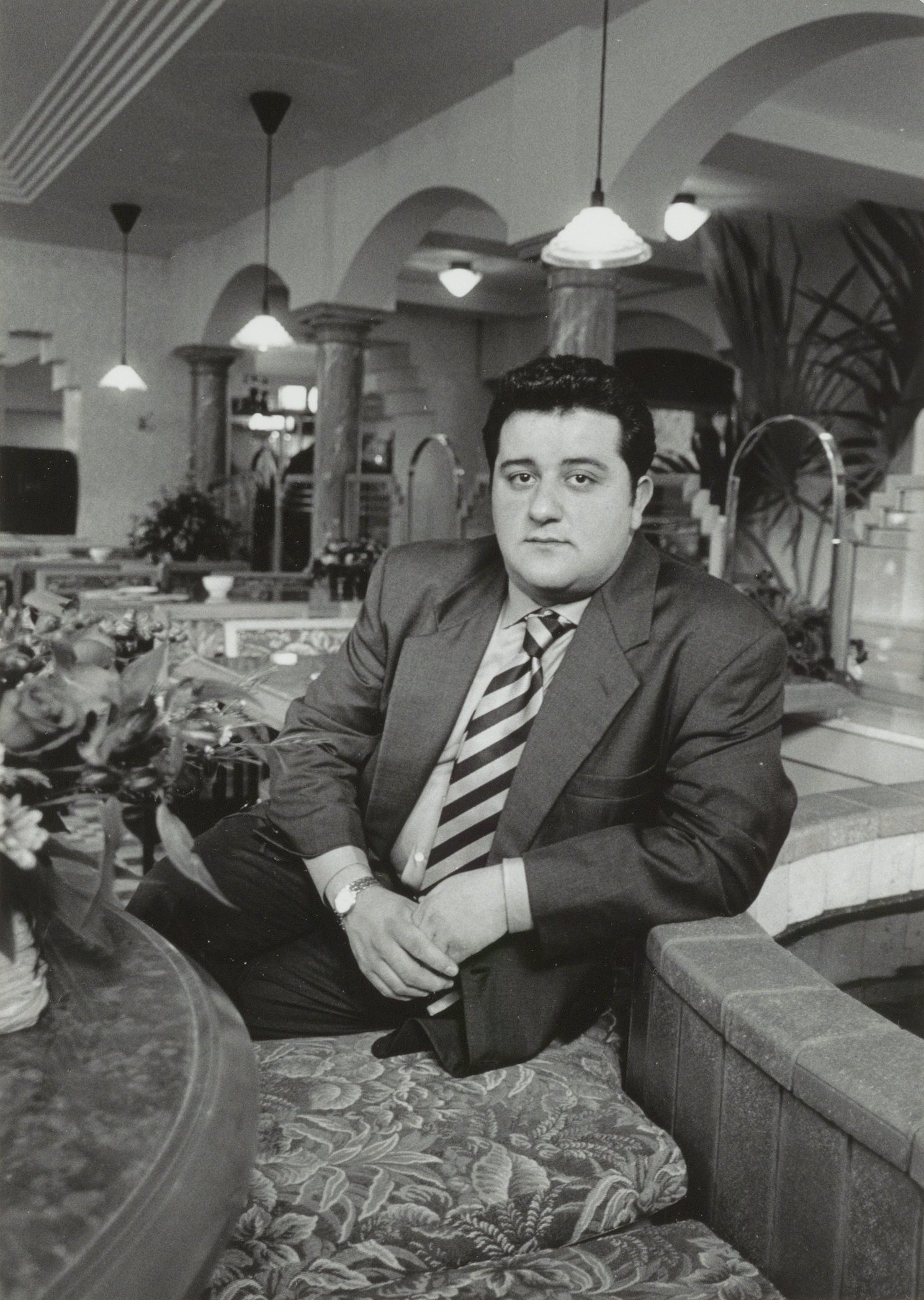
- Raiola in 1994
- Born: Carmine Raiola; 4 November 1967; Nocera Inferiore, Italy
- Died: 30 April 2022 (aged 54); Milan, Italy
- Occupation: Football agent
- Years active: 1992–2022

Carmine "Mino" Raiola (Italian: [ˈkarmine ˈmiːno ˈraːjola, - raˈjɔːla]; 4 November 1967 – 30 April 2022) was an Italian-Dutch football agent known for having represented players such as Pavel Nedvěd, Zlatan Ibrahimović, Paul Pogba, and Erling Haaland.

Raiola began his career in the Netherlands in 1992, where he had lived since moving there as a child, helping transfer Dutch players to Italy's Serie A. After starting his own agency, he became a renowned super-agent who was involved with many of the most high-profile and expensive transfers of the 21st century. A controversial figure, Raiola developed a reputation among players as an agent who sought the best for his clients, while many club directors and executives regarded him as greedy.

== Early life ==
Raiola was born in 1967 in Nocera Inferiore, Campania, in southern Italy. He moved to the Dutch city of Haarlem a year later with his parents. In the Netherlands, his father established a chain of pizzerias. There, Raiola spent his younger years, first washing dishes in an attempt to grow closer to his father, and later as a waiter. Due to his Dutch-language skills being greater than those of his father, he eventually began advising and organising within the business. At the same time, he obtained his high school diploma and attended university for two years, enrolling in the Faculty of Law. In a 2016 interview with German sports magazine 11 Freunde, he said his law studies were wasted time; "after all, I can buy lawyers". He started playing football for the youth team of HFC Haarlem, but stopped at age 18, and in 1987, he became head of the youth team, and later the club's technical director. He purchased a local McDonald’s and sold it to a property developer at 19, after which he became a millionaire.

== Agency career ==
After a brief venture as a player and administrator, Raiola remained involved in the football world as a football agent. He began working at Sports Promotions, a sports agency company, and assisted in the transfers of several high-profile Dutch players to Italian clubs, including Ajax player Bryan Roy (in 1992 to Foggia), Marciano Vink (in 1993 to Genoa), Wim Jonk and Dennis Bergkamp (both in 1993 to Inter Milan), and Michel Kreek (in 1994 to Padua). Speaking to British broadcaster Sky Sports in 2021, Roy and Kreek both praised Raiola for his ability to help them settle and taking the time to help with everyday aspects of their lives, including opening bank accounts, buying cars, and arranging accommodation. While staying with Roy in Foggia, Raiola met his wife and encountered the club's manager Zdeněk Zeman, with whom he quickly became friends. Zeman requested from Raiola a player "who dribbled like Maradona, ran 17 km per game and trained like a fanatic", but Raiola believed such a player did not exist.

After falling out with Rob Jansen, who founded Sports Promotions and had been his boss, Raiola decided to leave the company and start his own business. In 1995, the European Court of Justice's Bosman ruling allowed out-of-contract players to move throughout the European Union without transfer fees; coupled with an increase in television money in the sport, transfers and player contracts became more important in club football, and agents became more necessary to players than ever. His first major independent transfer was Pavel Nedvěd's signing from Sparta Prague for Lazio following his impressive performance at UEFA Euro 1996. Lazio's manager at the time was Zdeněk Zeman, and Nedvěd fit the description he had given Raiola years earlier. Raiola held several of his clients to the standard set by Nedvěd, an "extremist" who could "train harder than you can imagine". Raiola instigated Nedvěd's transfer to Juventus in 2001 and received a commission of six billion lira. With Juventus, Nedvěd won the Ballon d'Or in 2003 Raiola later guided several of Zlatan Ibrahimović's transfers that led him to being cumulatively the second-most expensive footballer in history by 2016. In 2008, Raiola was involved in two disciplinary hearings instigated by the Federazione Italiana Giuoco Calcio (FIGC) for transfer irregularities as part of a wider investigation of professional football by Italian authorities.

In August 2016, after closing the world record transfer of Paul Pogba to Manchester United, Raiola made a reported €25 million from Pogba's €105 million transfer; he subsequently bought the former Miami home of gangster Al Capone for €9 million. On 8 May 2019, the Italian Football Federation banned Raiola from acting as an agent representative for three months for undisclosed reasons, while his cousin Vincenzo Raiola was banned for two months. On 10 May, the bans were extended worldwide after the FIFA Disciplinary Committee absorbed the Italian federation's decisions. On 13 June, after Raiola and his cousin appealed the original ban to the Federal Court of Appeal in Italy, they won, resulting in a revocation of the three-month ban.

In 2019, Raiola, along with fellow agents Roger Wittmann, Jorge Mendes and Jonathan Barnett, formed "The Football Forum", an international movement of players and agents to help create a new football system opposed to FIFA. On 22 January 2020, Raiola, along with Mendes and Barnett among others, threatened FIFA with legal sanctions following the planned cap on transfer payments. During a 2021 interview with The Athletic, Raiola explained that his feelings towards FIFA stemmed from the many scandals and allegations of corruption aimed at the organisation.

== Reputation ==
Viewed as a "super-agent", Raiola was among the most high-profile agents in football, with his involvement in lucrative transfers making him as famous as his clients. He was regularly categorised as being among the richest and most powerful agents in the sport, and upon his death in 2022, Italian newspaper La Gazzetta dello Sport described him as "the most powerful, the best, the most discussed".

Due to his success, Raiola was a controversial figure seen as unscrupulous and impudent, and his brash style led him into conflict with figures throughout world football such as Napoli chairman Aurelio De Laurentiis, who he compared to fascist dictator Benito Mussolini, and former Manchester United manager Alex Ferguson, who labelled Raiola a "shitbag" while recalling dealings he had with Raiola which lead to the departure of Paul Pogba from the club. Football executive Adriano Galliani, who dealt with Raiola at AC Milan, said he and Raiola developed a positive relationship based on sympathy due to the conflicting interests of the other, and acknowledging that Raiola only wanted what was best for his clients.

Raiola was known for his tough negotiation tactics and for frequently defending his clients from criticism. He often used the media to attack pundits and managers, such as Paul Scholes, and in one instance referred to Pep Guardiola by saying, "as a person he's an absolute zero. He's a coward, a dog". Dutch journalist Taco van den Velde attributed his success to his hard work and intelligence, and his ability to fight for what was best for his client. Raiola described himself as an "altruist" in contrast to fellow agent Jorge Mendes, who he described as an "egoist", due to the differing motivations of both.

Due to working for his father's restaurant, the caricature of Raiola as a "pizzaiolo" formed following a clash with former Inter Milan player Siniša Mihajlović. He was often characterised as being from the American television programme The Sopranos due to his personality, fashion sense, and attitude, including by Ibrahimović, and was regularly underestimated due to his appearance. In his autobiography I Am Zlatan Ibrahimović, he recalled choosing Raiola as his new agent after Dutch journalist Thijs Slegers called Raiola a "mafioso". Writing for Spanish newspaper Marca in 2016, José Félix Díaz noted that Raiola's residence in Monaco was in a small apartment rather than an luxurious mansion, and his lifestyle had not changed, as he opted to not wear fancy clothing. His office was based in Monte Carlo and had only four employees and "no traces of luxury", according to Italian newspaper La Repubblica.

In January 2025, the BBC described Raiola as "probably the most famous agent of all, with a fearsome reputation for negotiating the maximum for himself and his clients".

== Personal life and death ==
Raiola resided in the principality of Monaco with his family. He spoke seven languages: Italian, English, German, Spanish, French, Portuguese and Dutch.

In January 2022, Raiola was admitted to San Raffaele Hospital in Milan, where he underwent surgery. Staff of Raiola denied reports he was in intensive care, describing them as "routine checks", and he was discharged ten days later. In April, Raiola's business partner and a doctor treating him both indicated that Raiola was "fighting" for his life. On 28 April, several news outlets reported his death, which he subsequently refuted in a social media post, stating: "Second time in 4 months they kill me." On 30 April, Raiola's family released a statement confirming that he had died at the age of 54.

== Notable clients ==
- (Italy) Mario Balotelli
- (Armenia) Henrikh Mkhitaryan
- (Netherlands) Matthijs de Ligt
- (Italy) Gianluigi Donnarumma
- (Czech Republic) Zdeněk Grygera
- (Norway) Erling Haaland
- (Egypt) Mido
- (Sweden) Zlatan Ibrahimović
- (Italy) Lorenzo Insigne
- (Italy) Moise Kean
- (England) Jesse Lingard
- (Mexico) Hirving Lozano
- (Belgium) Romelu Lukaku
- (Netherlands) Donyell Malen
- (France) Blaise Matuidi
- (Brazil) Maxwell
- (Czech Republic) Pavel Nedvěd
- (France) Paul Pogba
- (Netherlands) Xavi Simons
- (Netherlands) Gregory van der Wiel
- (Italy) Marco Verratti
- (Slovakia) Vladimír Weiss
