= Emelie Schepp =

Swedish crime author (born 1979)

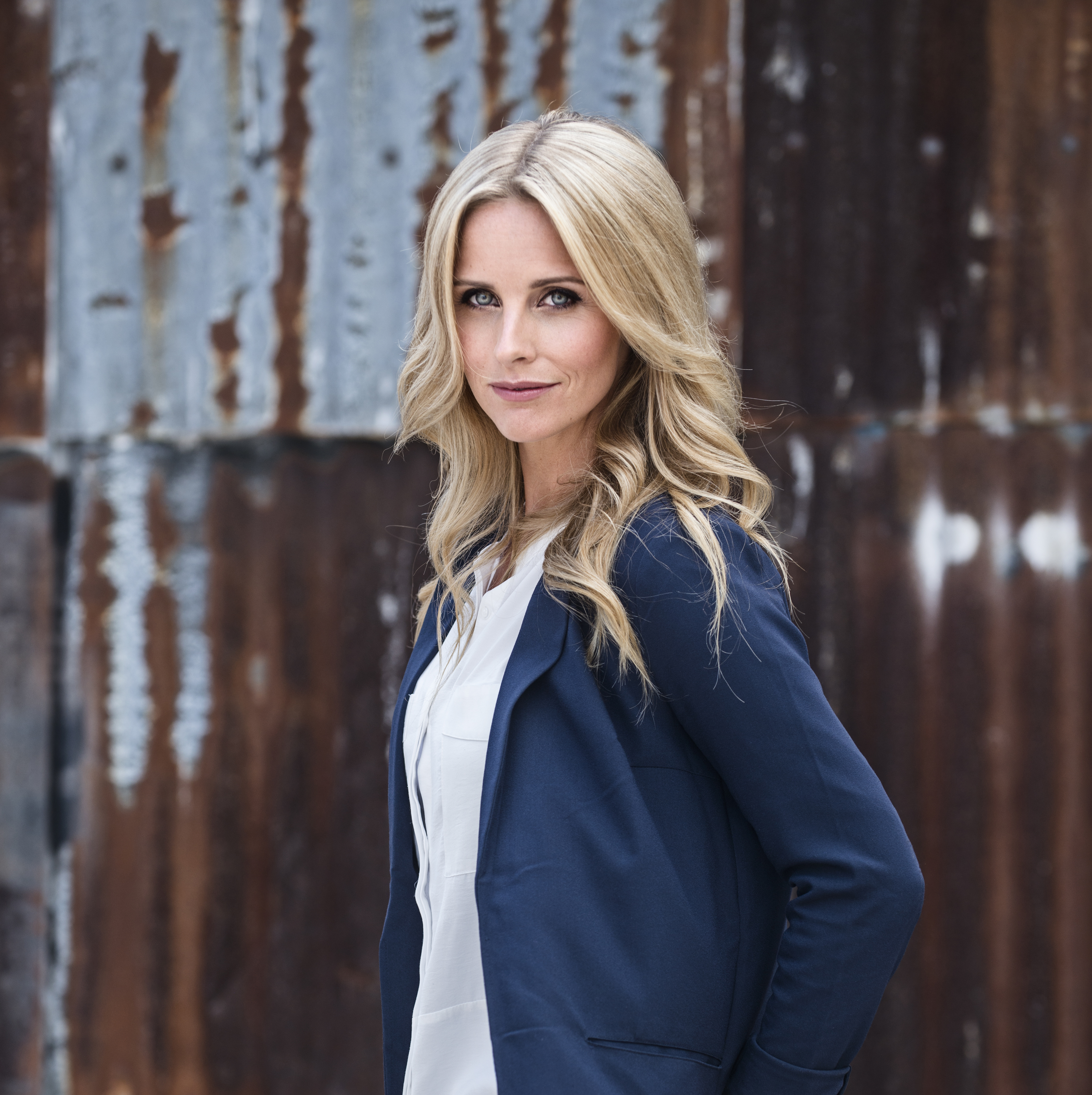
- Emelie Schepp in 2014
- Born: 5 September 1979 (age 46); Motala, Sweden
- Occupation: Crime author
- Notable work: Märkta för livet (Marked for Life)

Emelie Schepp (born 5 September 1979) is a Swedish crime author. Her crime novels are centered around Norrköping and focus on the main figure Jana Berzelius, a public prosecutor. An exception is Hundra dagar i juli (2024), about organ transplantation, which is set in her native town Motala.

== Biography ==
Schepp was born in Motala. In 2013, she made her debut with the crime novel Märkta för livet (English: Marked for Life, trans. Rod Bradbury) which sold 40,000 copies in just six months. She then signed a book deal for three books with Wahlström & Widstrand in the fall of 2014, re-releasing her debut book the same year.

Her Berzelius books have sold over a million copies worldwide. The rights of the series have been sold to thirty countries, and the books have been translated into Danish, Dutch, English, Estonian, Finnish, French, German, Hungarian, Icelandic, Italian, Japanese, Polish, Spanish and Turkish (January 2019). An adaptation of Märkta för livet as Jana: Marked for Life was broadcast in 2024.

== Bibliography ==
Series featuring Jana Berzelius

- 2014 Märkta för livet, Wahlström & Widstrand, ISBN 978-91-46-22651-2
  - 2016 in English: Marked for Life, trans. Rod Bradbury, Mira (Canada), ISBN 978-0-7783-1956-6
- 2015 Vita Spår, Wahlström & Widstrand, ISBN 978-91-46-22619-2
  - 2017 in English: Marked for Revenge, trans. Suzanne Martin Cheadle, Mira (Canada), ISBN 978-0-7783-1965-8
- 2016 Prio ett, Wahlström & Widstrand, ISBN 978-91-46-23027-4
  - 2018 in English: Slowly We Die, trans. Suzanne Martin Cheadle, Mira (Canada), ISBN 978-0-7783-1966-5
- 2017 Pappas pojke, HarperCollins Nordic, ISBN 978-91-509-2443-5
- 2019 Broder Jakob, HarperCollins Nordic, ISBN 978-91-509-4181-4
- 2020 Nio liv, HarperCollins Nordic, ISBN 978-91-509-6166-9
- 2022 Björnen sover, Norstedts, ISBN 978-91-1-310532-1
- 2025 Alter ego, Norstedts, ISBN 978-91-1-310533-8

Separate

- 2024 Hundra dagar i juli, Norstedts, ISBN 978-91-1-312970-9
