= Roger Wittmann =

German football agent

Roger Wittmann (born c. 1960) is a German football agent. He is the co-founder and managing director of ROGON International.

== Early life and education ==
Wittman trained as a sheet metal worker.

== Career ==
Wittman is widely regarded as one of the most influential football agents in Germany. As of 2018, he had approximately 120 players under contract, and had 20 employees. He has been credited with bringing a large influx of Brazilian players into the Bundesliga.
