= Sigrid Johnson =

Swedish actress (born 2006)

- Born: 17 March 2006 (age 20); Stockholm, Sweden
- Occupation: Actress
- Years active: 2011-present

Sigrid Johnson (born 17 March 2006) is a Swedish actress. She won the Guldbagge Award for Best Actress in a Leading Role for her performance as Sasha in Comedy Queen. She portrayed "Jojo" on Jana: Marked for Life (2024).
