= Tawfeek Barhom =

Israeli actor (born 1990)

- توفيق برهوم
- Born: July 28, 1990 (age 36); Ein Rafa, Israel
- Occupation: Actor
- Years active: 2011–present

Tawfeek Barhom (Arabic: توفيق برهوم, Hebrew: תאופיק ברהום; born 28 July 1990) is a Palestinian actor, director. His films include The Idol, Wounded Land, Worlds Apart (2015), and Boy from Heaven (2022).

== Early life ==
Born to a Palestinian family, Barhom grew up in Ein Rafa, a village near Jerusalem in Israel. While being an Israeli citizen, Barhom's Palestinian identity has shaped much of his career. He has furthermore stated that his Palestinian identity is always the prism through which he is perceived in daily interactions in Israel.

== Career ==
Barhom's breakthrough came with his leading role in A Borrowed Identity (2014). His performance was widely acclaimed, establishing him as a promising actor in the international film industry. In 2015, he starred in The Idol, Wounded Land and the Greek film Worlds Apart.

In 2022, Barhom starred in Boy from Heaven, a role that gained notable acclaim as the film was part of the main selection at the Cannes Film Festival that led to his nomination for Best Actor at the Guldbagge Awards in 2023.

Barhom's upcoming projects include The Way of the Wind, a biblical drama by director Terrence Malick. In this project, Barhom portrays John, contributing significantly to a film known for its extensive international shooting locations. The release date has yet to be announced as of April 2024.

Additionally, Barhom starred in The First Omen, released in April 2024, the prequel to the 1976 horror film The Omen.

Barhom will be featured in a leading role in Les Fantômes, a French film shot in Strasbourg. In this production, he performs in French. Currently in post-production, Les Fantômes is expected to release in 2024.

In 2025, Barhom won the Short Film Palme d'Or for his short film I'm Glad You're Dead Now, which Barhom wrote, directed, and starred in.

== Filmography ==
=== Film ===
Year	Title	Role	Notes
2013	Farewell Baghdad	Adnan	
2014	A Borrowed Identity	Eyad	Nominated — Ophir Award for Best Actor
2014	Lost in the White City	Cobi	
2014	ABCs of Death 2	Arab Boy	Segment: F is for Falling
2015	Worlds Apart	Farris	
2015	The Idol	Mohammed Assaf	
2015	Wounded Land	Terrorist	
2018	Mary Magdalene	James	
2020	The Rhythm Section	Mohammed Reza	
2022	Boy from Heaven	Adam	Nominated — Guldbagge Award for Best Actor
2024	The First Omen	Father Gabriel	
2024	Ghost Trail	Harfaz	
2025	I'm Glad You're Dead Now	Reda	Also writer and director Winner of the Short Film Palme d'Or
TBA	The Way of the Wind	John	Post-production

=== Television ===
Year	Title	Role	Notes
2012–2013	Euphoria	Dudu	Main cast
2014	Tyrant	Islamist	Episode: "Sins of the Father"
2015	Dig	Assaf, Margrove's Asst.	Episode: "Pilot"
2018	The Looming Tower	Khalid al-Mihdhar	Recurring role
2020	Baghdad Central	Amjad	Recurring role
2020	The Letter for the King	Jabroot	Recurring role
