= Ein Rafa =

Arab village in Israel

Ein Rafa: עין ראפה (Hebrew); عين رافا • عين رافة (Arabic)
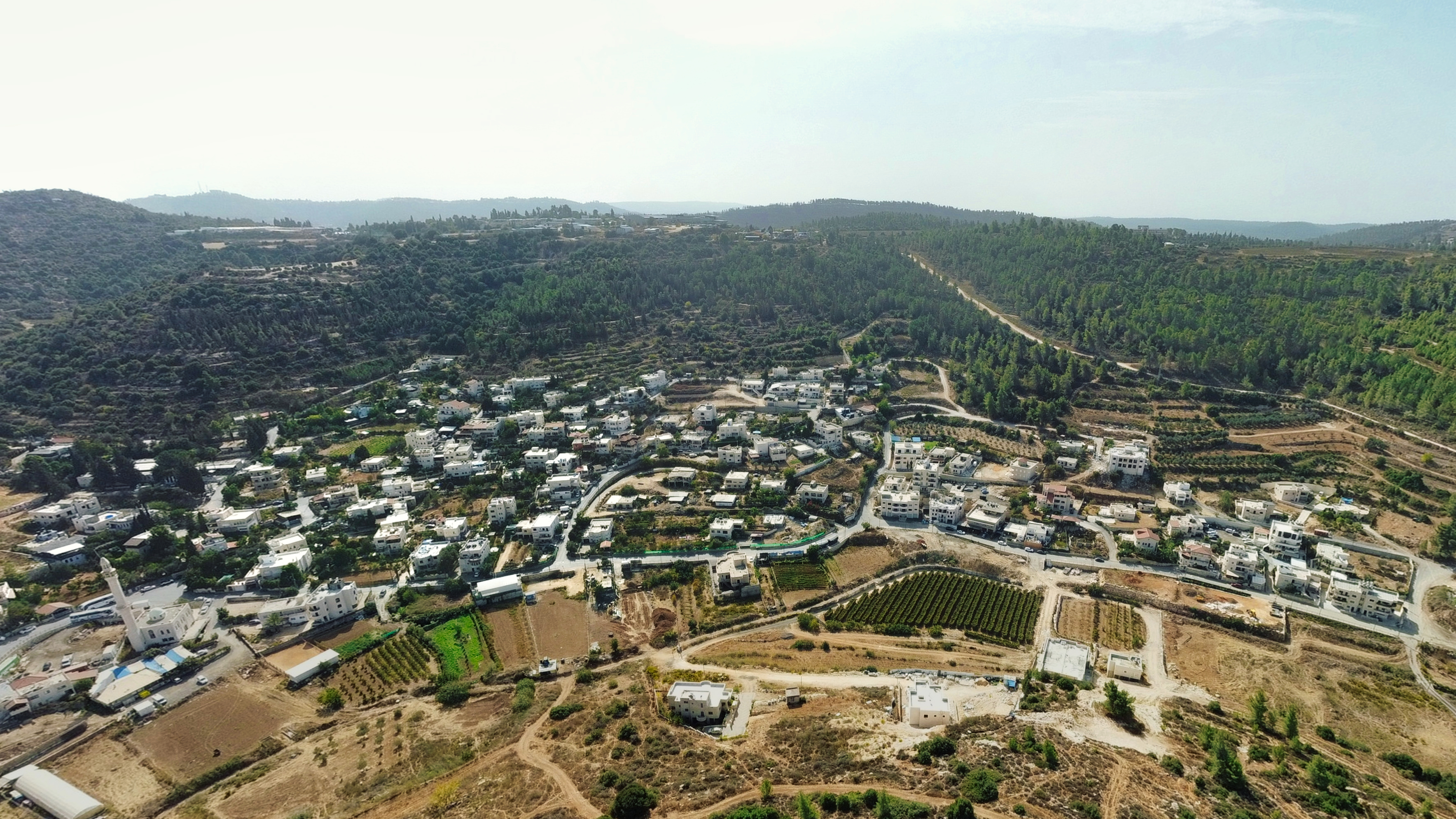

- Location within Jerusalem District Location within Israel
- Coordinates: 31°47′26″N 35°6′59″E
- Country: Israel
- District: Jerusalem
- Council: Mateh Yehuda
- Founded: 1940s
- Founder: Barhom family
- Population (2024): 1,417
- Website: einrafa.com

Ein Rafa (Arabic: عين رافا or عين رافة; Hebrew: עין ראפה) is an Arab village ten kilometers west of Jerusalem in Israel. Located on the other side of Route 1 to Abu Ghosh, it falls under the jurisdiction of Mateh Yehuda Regional Council. In 2024 it had a population of 1,417.

== History ==
Ein Rafa was founded in the 1940s when the Barhom family moved from the nearby village of Suba into the valley. It expanded after 1948 when several other families left Suba and settled there. Most of the residents of the village are descended from the Barhom family. In 2007, there was controversy when one home built without a permit was demolished in the village.

== Education and culture ==
In a co-existence project in Ein Rafa, children and teachers from the local school meet with Jewish children for joint activities in which they share food and games and become more trusting of one another.

== Notable people ==
- Tawfeek Barhom (b. 1990), actor

== Gallery ==
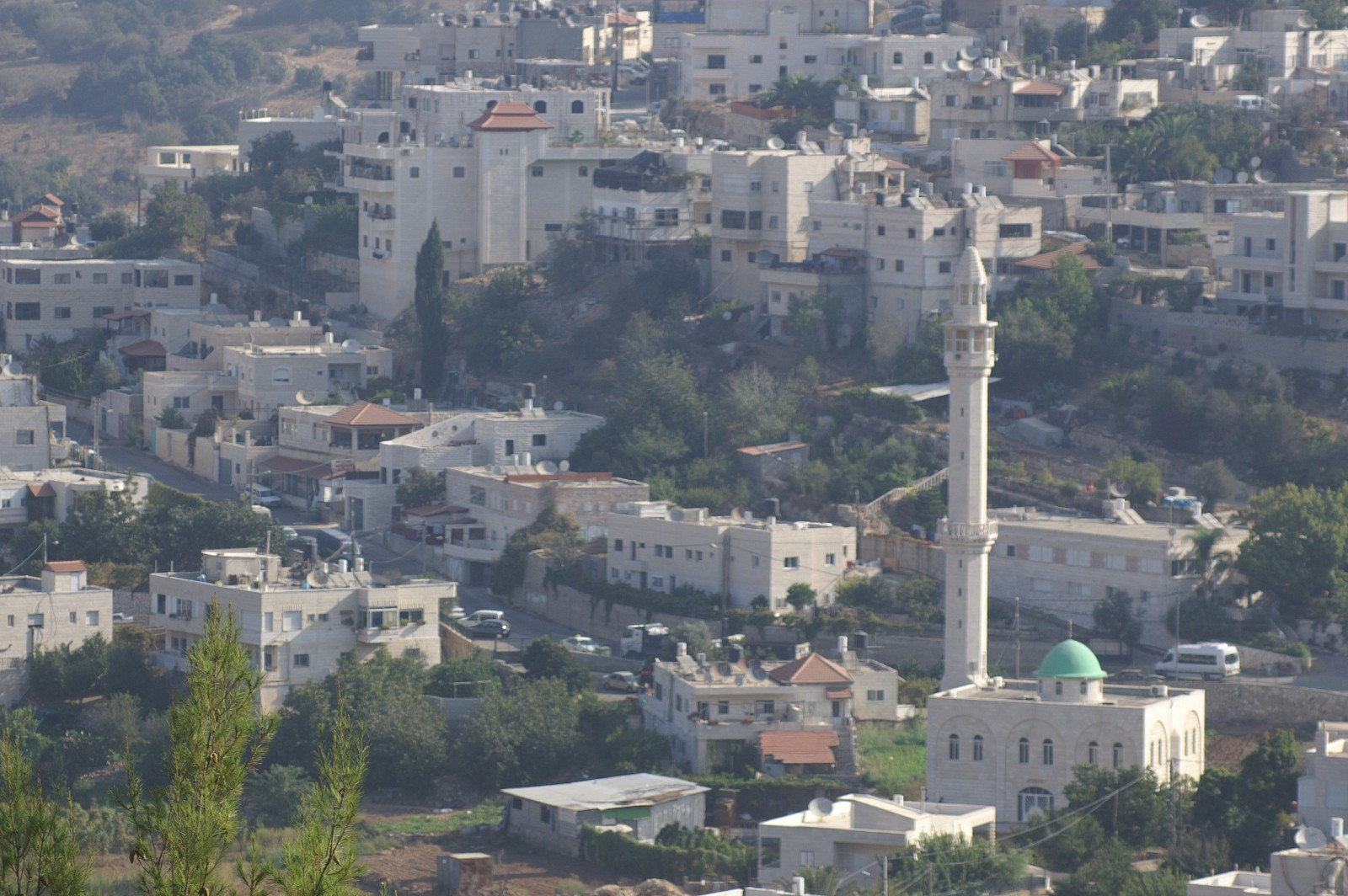

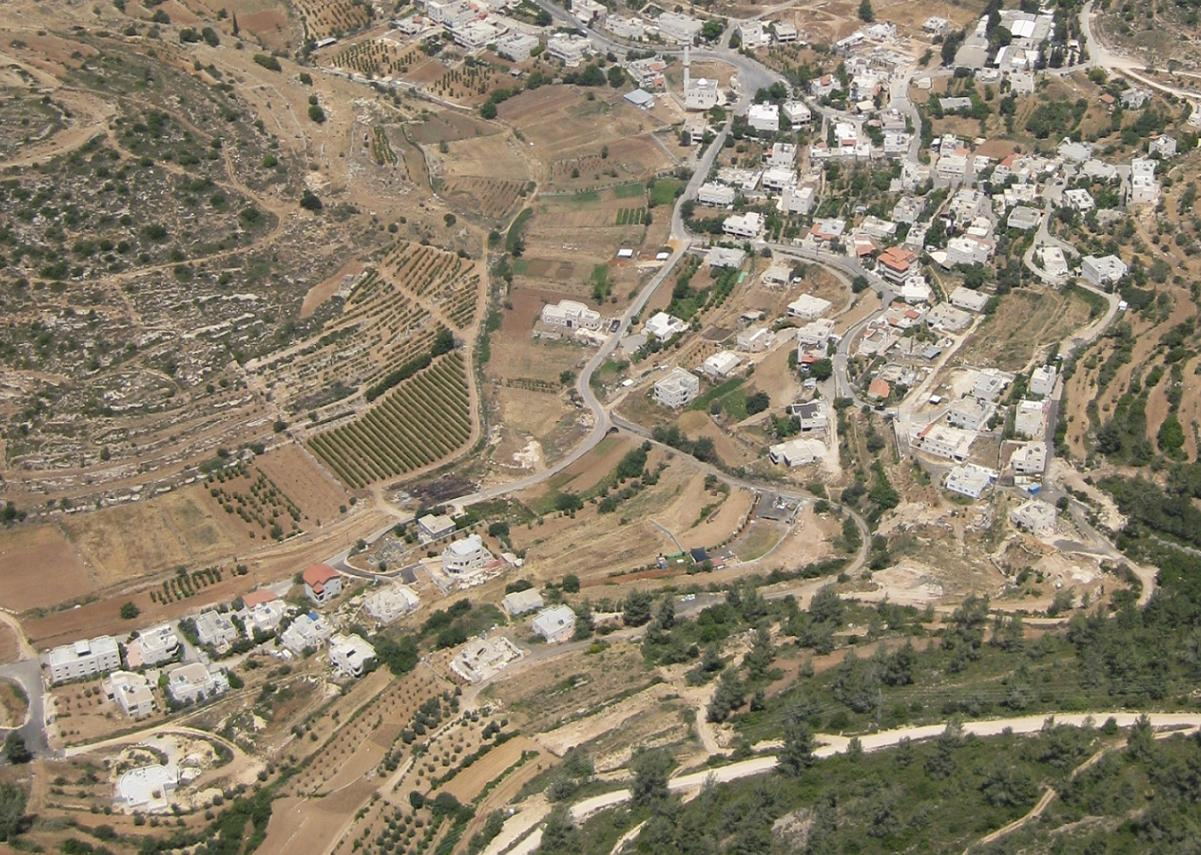

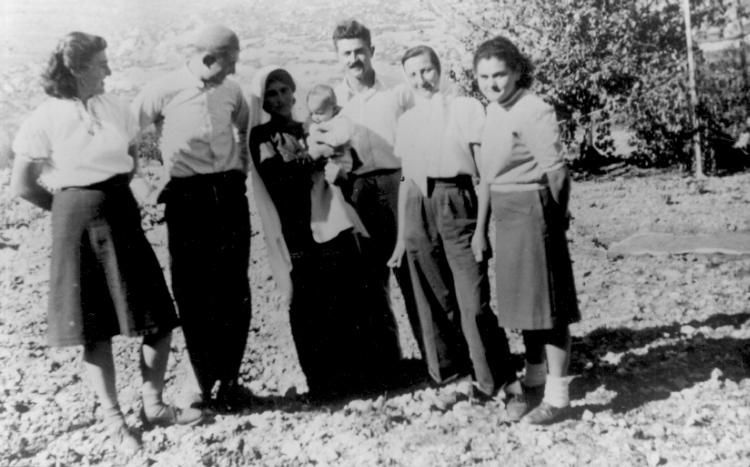
Members of kibbutz Tzova on a "courtesy visit" to Ein Rafa, 1948

== See also ==
- Arab localities in Israel
- Arab-Israeli peace projects
- Population displacements in Israel after 1948
- Tawfeek Barhom
