= Jenny Jägerfeld =

Swedish psychologist and writer

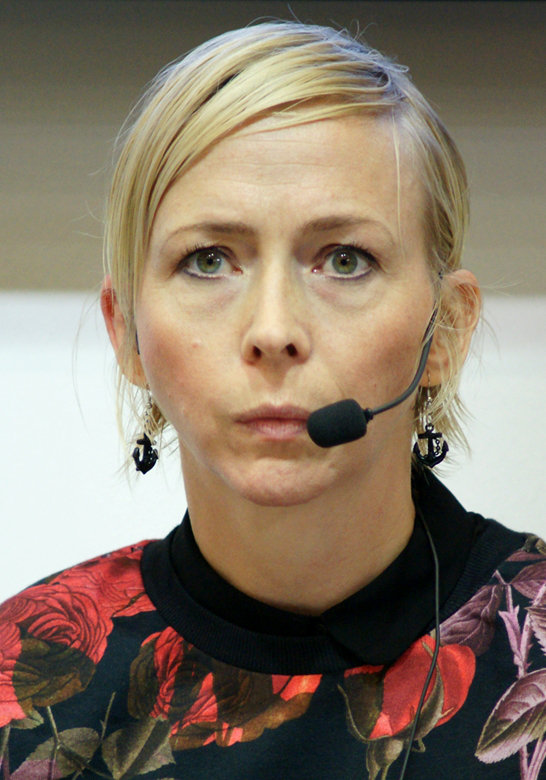
- Born: 6 April 1974 (age 52); Skärblacka, Norrköping Municipality, Sweden
- Occupations: Psychologist; Writer
- Awards: August Prize (2010); Astrid Lindgren Prize (2017)

Jenny Jägerfeld (born 6 April 1974) is a Swedish psychologist and writer.

== Biography ==
Born in Skärblacka on 6 April 1974 Jägerfeld made her literary debut in 2006, with the novel Hål i huvudet. In 2010, she issued Här ligger jag och blöder, a novel for young adults, which earned her the August Prize.

Further books include Jag är ju så jävla easy going from 2013, Brorsan är kung! (2016), Blixtra, spraka, blända! (2018), and Min storslagna död from 2021.

In 2017 she was awarded the Astrid Lindgren Prize.
