= Hans Ryde =

Swedish physicist (born 1931)

Hans Bengt Ryde
- Born: 17 January 1931 (age 95)
- Education: Stockholm University
- Scientific career
- Fields: Physics
- Workplaces: University of Lund

Hans Ryde (born 17 January 1931) is a Swedish physicist who is a member of the Royal Swedish Academy of Sciences. He was awarded his Doctor of Philosophy at Stockholm University in 1962. He was employed by the Research Institute of Atomic Physics in Frescati, Stockholm during the 60s and 70s, where he did his research in the field of nuclear structural physics in general and deformed nuclear nuclei in particular. By using a 225-cm cyclotron he discovered, together with his colleague Arne Johnson, that there was a backbending effect in fast rotating nuclei. In 1975, he replaced Sten von Friesen as a professor at the Department of Physics, Lund University. He became a member of the Royal Swedish Academy of Sciences in 1992 and the Finnish Society of Sciences and Letters in 1988.

In 1972, the Royal Swedish Academy of Sciences awarded Ryde the Edlund Prize "for work that led to the discovery of phase transitions in the atomic nucleus—the so-called nuclear Meissner effect", an early acknowledgement of the broader significance of the backbending phenomenon he had reported the previous year.

Beyond research, he played a prominent international service role: during 1990–1993 he served as secretary of the Nuclear Physics Board of the European Physical Society (EPS), coordinating conference series such as "Nuclear Structure at High Spin" and helping to draft the EPS long-range plan for medium-energy accelerators.

During the late-1970s Ryde founded the Gamma-Ray Spectroscopy Group at Lund, securing funds for TESSA I, a 32-crystal germanium detector that was the largest high-resolution γ-ray array in Europe at the time. Its finer energy and timing precision let his team track how fast-spinning nuclei shed angular momentum: in medium-mass nuclei (around mass number 80) they followed a rotational sequence right up to the point where the spin can no longer be sustained, a limit known as band termination. With the same apparatus they observed that some heavier nuclei (mass number of about 150) adopt highly elongated "rugby-ball" shapes—so-called super-deformed bands—when rotating very rapidly. The two sets of results, published between 1983 and 1987, are now standard textbook cases of extreme nuclear motion.

Over the course of his career he supervised fifteen doctoral students, served on the editorial board of Nuclear Physics A (1986–1994) and, after formal retirement, helped integrate high-spin experiments into the MAX-lab accelerator programme at Lund, acting as scientific adviser until 2005.
