= Dubna, Vladimir Oblast =

Dubna Дубна Dubna Village of Vladimir Oblast
- Town
- Location within Vladimir Oblast Location within Russia
- Coordinates: 56°28′N 38°25′E
- Country: Russia
- Region Vladimir Oblast: Vladimir Oblast
- District: Alexandrovsky District
- Established: 1981
- Time zone: UTC+3:00

Dubna (Russian: Дубна) is a rural locality (a village) in Krasnoplamenskoye Rural Settlement, Alexandrovsky District, Vladimir Oblast, Russia. The population was 6 as of 2010. There is 1 street.

== Geography ==
Dubna is located on the Dubna River, 28 kilometres (17 mi) northwest of Alexandrov (the district's administrative centre) by road. Konyukhovo is the nearest rural locality.
