= Parisa Amiri =

Swedish journalist

Parisa Amiri (born 23 July 1990) is a Swedish freelancing journalist and television presenter. She has been the editor in chief of Nöjesguiden, and as well as presenting and participating in several television shows on SVT.

== Biography ==
Amiri was born and grew up in Stockholm, her father is from Iran. She started her career as a blogger for the comedy site 1000 Apor. And then went on to be a writer and then editor in chief for the magazine Nöjesguiden for five years.

In 2012, Parisa Amiri was a presenter of the radioshow PP3 on Sveriges Radio. She studied law for one semester at Stockholms University. In 2016, Amiri was the presenter for two seasons of the tv show Edit: Talkshow med Parisa Amiri for SVT and SVT Play.

In the same year she along with Fredrik Sahlin presented the film show Babel bio on SVT. She was hired as the editor of culture for Culture Magazine, where she covered the latest trends and wrote about popular culture nationally and internationally, while at the same time working for SVT. In 2016, Amiri participated as a contestant in Årets retro on SVT, and winning.

In 2017, she started presentering the show Kobra for SVT. Parisa Amiri along with Gunnar Wetterberg participated in and won two seasons in a row of the SVT show På spåret.

Since 2018, Amiri and Brita Zackari have the podcast Brita och Parisa together. Since 2020, she as well presents the Spotify-podcast Diktatorer along with Gunnar Wetterberg. For New Years eve 2020 she presenter the show Tolvslaget på Skansen counting down for the new year, broadcast on SVT.

Paris Amiri presenter her own episode of the radioshow Sommar i P1 on Sveriges Radio on 1 August 2021, where she spoke about Metoo, racism, and her life.
