= Globe Soccer Awards =

Annual association football award

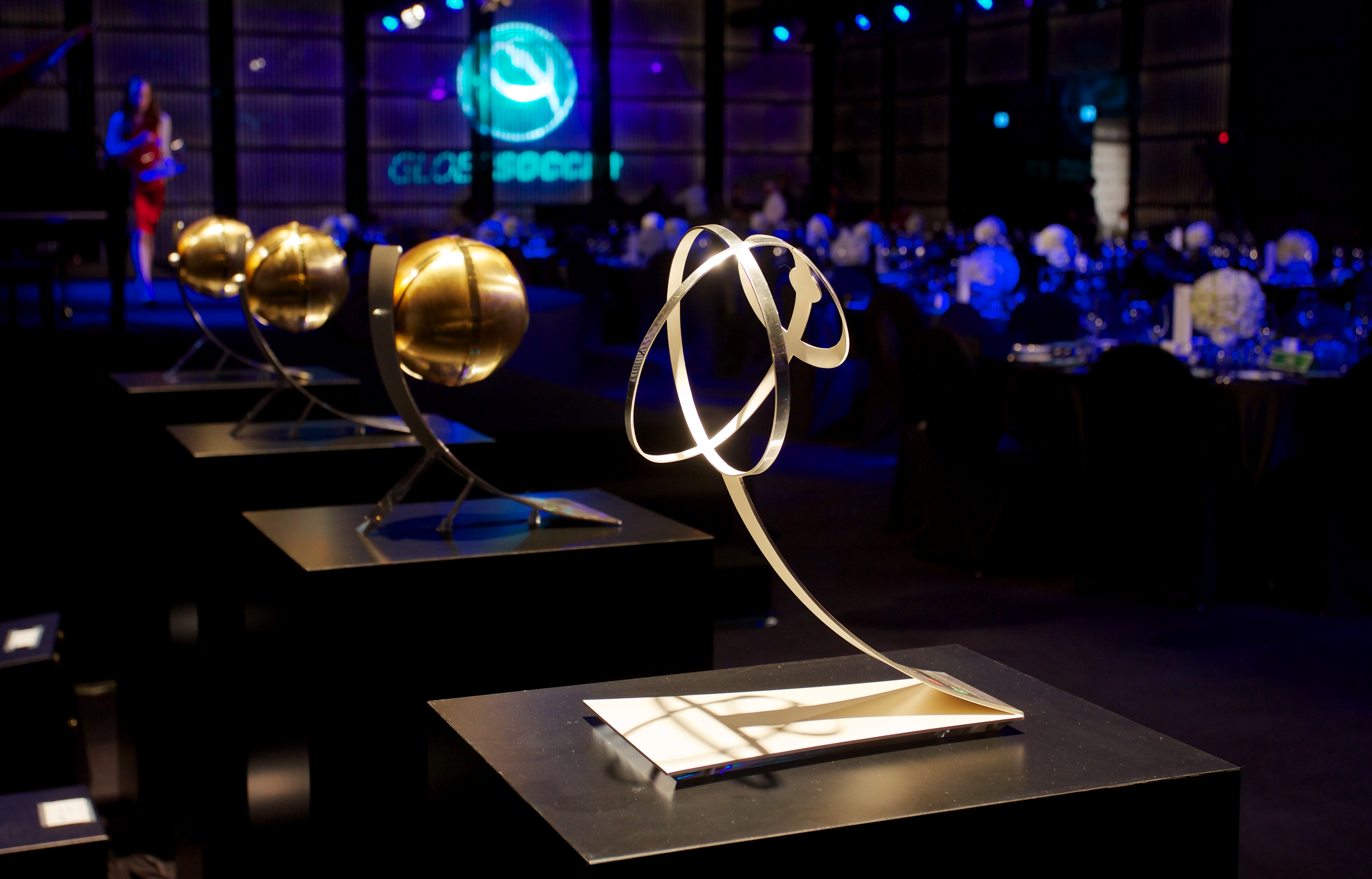
- Trophies awarded at the 2010 ceremony
- Sponsored by: Beyond Developments
- Country: United Arab Emirates
- First award: 2010
- Website: globesoccer.com

The Globe Soccer Awards, commonly and unofficially known as Dubai d'Or, are awards which acknowledge achievements in football. The event was founded in 2010 by Tommaso Bendoni and is co-owned by Riccardo Silva. It is organized by Globe Soccer and involves participation from international football organizations such as UEFA, UAE Pro League, ECA (European Clubs Association), and EFAA (European Association of Football Agents). It is held annually in Dubai, United Arab Emirates. Some of the Globe Soccer Awards' partners are the Dubai Sports Council and the Spanish newspaper Marca. The awards have been criticized due to the monopoly of Cristiano Ronaldo's agent Jorge Mendes.

== History ==
Founded in 2010 by Tommaso Bendoni, the first edition of the Globe Soccer Awards started with three categories, expanding to six in 2011 and ten by 2012. Over the years, the number of awards and categories has increased, mirroring the growth and diversification of global football. The focus on women's football at the Globe Soccer Awards has also increased with specific categories introduced for achievements in women's football.

== Selection process ==
The awards are given to individuals and entities within the football industry for their achievements. The selection process for award recipients involves two stages of voting, where football fans worldwide participate. In the first stage, the public selects the finalists from a set of nominees. In the second stage, the final decision is made by both public votes and a jury comprising football professionals such as journalists, agents, coaches, and ex-players.

== Criticism ==
The Globe Soccer Awards are not widely considered a serious or prestigious ceremony by most football experts, journalists, or analysts. They are often viewed as a glamorous commercial event with significant biases and limited credibility compared to established awards like the Ballon d'Or or FIFA The Best Award. The Globe Soccer Awards have faced criticism for perceived bias toward agent Jorge Mendes, due to his near-monopoly on the Best Agent of the Year award, and Ronaldo's record haul of prizes. This perception has been further fueled by the introduction of the Best Middle East Player category in 2023, shortly after Ronaldo's high-profile transfer to Saudi club Al-Nassr in January of that year.

== Winners ==
=== 2010 ===
- In December 2010, during the closing gala, the Audi Football Night, the winners of the Globe Soccer Awards were announced:

| Award | Winner | Team(s) |
|---|---|---|
| Best Agent of the Year | (Portugal) Jorge Mendes | — |
| Best Director of the Year | (Spain) Miguel Ángel Gil Marín | (Spain) Atlético Madrid |
| Best Club Director Career Award | (Italy) Adriano Galliani | (Italy) Milan |

=== 2011 ===
- In December 2011, 6 awards were awarded in Dubai:

| Award | Winner | Team(s) |
|---|---|---|
| Best Player of the Year | (Portugal) Cristiano Ronaldo | (Spain) Real Madrid |
| Best Media Attraction in Football | (Portugal) Cristiano Ronaldo | (Spain) Real Madrid |
| Best Club of the Year | (Spain) Real Madrid | — |
| Player Career Award | (Italy) Alessandro Del Piero | (Italy) Juventus |
| Best Agent of the Year | (Portugal) Jorge Mendes | — |
| Career Award | (Portugal) Pinto da Costa | — |

=== 2012 ===
- In December 2012, 10 awards were awarded in Dubai:

| Award | Winner | Team(s) |
|---|---|---|
| Best Player of the Year | (Colombia) Radamel Falcao | (Spain) Atlético Madrid |
| Best Club of the Year | (Spain) Atlético Madrid | — |
| Player Career Award | (France) Eric Abidal | (Spain) Barcelona |
| Best Player of the 20th Century | (Argentina) Diego Maradona | — |
| Best Agent of the Year | (Portugal) Jorge Mendes | — |
| Agent Career Award | (Netherlands) Rob Jansen | — |
| Best Coach of the Year | (Portugal) José Mourinho | (Spain) Real Madrid |
| Best Goal Scorer of the UAE | (United Arab Emirates) Hassan Mohamed | (United Arab Emirates) Dubai CSC |
| Best Media Attraction in Football | (Portugal) José Mourinho | (Spain) Real Madrid |
| Career Award | (France) Michel Platini | — |

=== 2013 ===
- In December 2013, 11 awards were awarded in Dubai:

| Award | Winner | Team(s) |
|---|---|---|
| Best Player of the Year | (France) Franck Ribéry | (Germany) Bayern Munich |
| Best Agent of the Year | (Portugal) Jorge Mendes | — |
| Agent Career Award | (Italy) Giovanni Branchini | — |
| Player Career Award | (Portugal) Deco | — |
| Best Coach of the Year | (Italy) Antonio Conte | (Italy) Juventus |
| Coach Career Award | (Spain) Pep Guardiola | (Germany) Bayern Munich |
| Best Media Attraction in Football | (Spain) Pep Guardiola | (Germany) Bayern Munich |
| Best Club of the Year | (Germany) Bayern Munich | (Germany) Bayern Munich |
| Player Career Award | (Spain) Xavi | — |
| Best Coach in the GCC | (United Arab Emirates) Mahdi Ali | United Arab Emirates |
| Fans' Favourite Player | (Portugal) Cristiano Ronaldo | (Spain) Real Madrid |

=== 2014 ===
- In December 2014, 13 awards were awarded in Dubai:

| Award | Winner | Team(s) |
|---|---|---|
| Best Player of the Year | (Portugal) Cristiano Ronaldo | (Spain) Real Madrid |
| Marca Fans' Favourite Player | (Portugal) Cristiano Ronaldo | (Spain) Real Madrid |
| Best Agent of the Year | (Portugal) Jorge Mendes | — |
| Player Career Award | (Italy) Filippo Inzaghi | — |
| Best Coach of the Year | (Italy) Carlo Ancelotti | (Spain) Real Madrid |
| Best Media Attraction in Football | (Italy) Carlo Ancelotti | (Spain) Real Madrid |
| Best Club of the Year | (Spain) Real Madrid | (Spain) Real Madrid |
| Best President of the Year | (Spain) Florentino Pérez | (Spain) Real Madrid |
| Best Revelation Player of the Year | (Colombia) James Rodríguez | (Spain) Real Madrid |
| Best Referee of the Year | (Italy) Nicola Rizzoli | — |
| Best Media Executive | (Italy) Riccardo Silva | — |
| Best Arab Player of The Year | (Morocco) Medhi Benatia | (Germany) Bayern Munich |
| Special Award | (Spain) Atlético Madrid | (Spain) Atlético Madrid |
| Special Award | (Italy) Riccardo Montolivo | (Italy) Milan |
| Special Award | (Russia) Vadim Vasilyev | (France) Monaco |

=== 2015 ===
- In December 2015, 12 awards were awarded in Dubai:

| Award | Winner | Team(s) |
|---|---|---|
| Best Player of the Year | (Argentina) Lionel Messi | (Spain) Barcelona |
| Best Agent of the Year | (Portugal) Jorge Mendes | — |
| Player Career Award | (Italy) Andrea Pirlo | — |
| Player Career Award | (England) Frank Lampard | — |
| Best Coach of the Year | (Belgium) Marc Wilmots | Belgium |
| Best Media Attraction in Football | (Spain) Barcelona | — |
| Best Club of the Year | (Spain) Barcelona | — |
| Best President of the Year | (Spain) Josep Maria Bartomeu | (Spain) Barcelona |
| Best Referee of the Year | (Uzbekistan) Ravshan Irmatov | — |
| Best Club Academy | (Portugal) Benfica | — |
| Best GCC Player of the Year | (Saudi Arabia) Yasser Al-Shahrani | (Saudi Arabia) Al-Hilal |
| Best Transfer Market Club Award | (France) Monaco | — |

=== 2016 ===
- In December 2016, 15 awards were awarded in Dubai:

| Award | Winner | Team(s) |
|---|---|---|
| Best Player of the Year | (Portugal) Cristiano Ronaldo | (Spain) Real Madrid |
| Goodwill Award | (Portugal) Cristiano Ronaldo | (Spain) Real Madrid |
| Best President of the Year | (Spain) Florentino Pérez | (Spain) Real Madrid |
| Best Club of the Year | (Spain) Real Madrid | — |
| Best Coach of the Year | (Portugal) Fernando Santos | Portugal |
| Best Referee of the Year | (England) Mark Clattenburg | — |
| Best GCC Player of the Year | (United Arab Emirates) Omar Abdulrahman | (United Arab Emirates) Al Ain |
| Best GCC Club of the Year | (Saudi Arabia) Al-Hilal | — |
| Best Arab Player of the Year | (Egypt) Mohamed Salah | (Italy) Roma |
| Best Chinese Player of the Year | (China) Zheng Zhi | (China) Guangzhou Evergrande |
| Best Agent of the Year | (Italy) (Netherlands) Mino Raiola | — |
| Player Career Award | (Argentina) Javier Zanetti | — |
| Player Career Award | (Cameroon) Samuel Eto'o | — |
| Special Award | (Spain) Unai Emery | — |
| Best Sports Media Agency of the Year | (England) MP & Silva | — |

=== 2017 ===
- In December 2017, 14 awards were awarded in Dubai:

| Award | Winner | Team(s) |
|---|---|---|
| Best Player of the Year | (Portugal) Cristiano Ronaldo | (Spain) Real Madrid |
| Best Coach of the Year | (France) Zinedine Zidane | (Spain) Real Madrid |
| Best Club of the Year | (Spain) Real Madrid | — |
| Best League of the Year | (Spain) La Liga | — |
| Best Referee of the Year | (Germany) Felix Brych | — |
| Player Career Award | (Italy) Francesco Totti | — |
| Player Career Award | (Spain) Carles Puyol | — |
| Coach Career Award | (Italy) Marcello Lippi | — |
| Best Arab National Team Coach | (Argentina) Héctor Cúper | Egypt |
| Best Arab National Team | Saudi Arabia | — |
| Best Agent of the Year | (Portugal) Jorge Mendes | — |
| Best Football Executive Award | (Russia) Vadim Vasilyev | (France) Monaco |
| Sport Business Award | (Spain) Ferran Soriano | (England) Manchester City (United States) New York City FC (Australia) Melbourne City |
| Master Coach Special Award | (Argentina) Diego Simeone | (Spain) Atlético Madrid |

=== 2018 ===
- In January 2019, 13 awards were awarded in Dubai:

| Award | Winner | Team(s) |
|---|---|---|
| Best Player of the Year | (Portugal) Cristiano Ronaldo | (Spain) Real Madrid (Italy) Juventus |
| Globe Soccer 433 Fans' Award | (Portugal) Cristiano Ronaldo | (Spain) Real Madrid (Italy) Juventus |
| Best Club of the Year | (Spain) Atlético Madrid | — |
| Best Coach of the Year | (France) Didier Deschamps | France |
| Best Goalkeeper of the Year | (Brazil) Alisson | (Italy) Roma (England) Liverpool |
| Best Agent of the Year | (Portugal) Jorge Mendes | — |
| Special Career Award | (Croatia) Zvonimir Boban | — |
| Player Career Award | (Brazil) Ronaldo | — |
| Player Career Award | (France) Blaise Matuidi | — |
| Coach Career Award | (Italy) Fabio Capello | — |
| Best Sporting Director of the Year | (Italy) Fabio Paratici | (Italy) Juventus |
| Arab Player Career Award | (Saudi Arabia) Sami Al-Jaber | — |
| Best Arab Referee of the Year | (United Arab Emirates) Mohammed Abdulla | — |

=== 2019 ===
- In December 2019, 16 awards were awarded in Dubai:

| Award | Winner | Team(s) |
|---|---|---|
| Best Men's Player of the Year | (Portugal) Cristiano Ronaldo | (Italy) Juventus |
| Best Revelation Player | (Portugal) João Félix | (Portugal) Benfica (Spain) Atlético Madrid |
| Best Women's Player of the Year | (England) Lucy Bronze | (France) Lyon |
| Best Referee of the Year | (France) Stéphanie Frappart | — |
| Player Career Award | (Bosnia and Herzegovina) Miralem Pjanić | — |
| Player Career Award | (Wales) Ryan Giggs | — |
| Best Partnership of the Year Award by Sport Business | (Germany) SAP | (England) Manchester City |
| Best Agent of the Year | (Portugal) Jorge Mendes | — |
| Best Academy of the Year | (Netherlands) Ajax (Portugal) Benfica | — |
| Best Young Arab Player of the Year | (Morocco) Achraf Hakimi | (Germany) Borussia Dortmund |
| Best Arab Club Award | (Saudi Arabia) Al-Hilal | — |
| Best Arab Player Award | (Morocco) Abderrazak Hamdallah | (Saudi Arabia) Al-Nassr |
| Best Coach of the Year | (Germany) Jürgen Klopp | (England) Liverpool |
| Best Club of the Year | (England) Liverpool | (England) Liverpool |
| Best Goalkeeper of the Year | (Brazil) Alisson | (England) Liverpool |
| Best Sporting Director of the Year | (Italy) Andrea Berta | (Spain) Atlético Madrid |

=== 2020 ===
- In December 2020, 10 awards were awarded in Dubai:

| Award | Winner | Team(s) |
|---|---|---|
| Player of the Century 2001–2020 | (Portugal) Cristiano Ronaldo | — |
| Player of the Year | (Poland) Robert Lewandowski | (Germany) Bayern Munich |
| Coach of the Century 2001–2020 | (Spain) Pep Guardiola | — |
| Coach of the Year | (Germany) Hansi Flick | (Germany) Bayern Munich |
| Club of the Century 2001–2020 | (Spain) Real Madrid | — |
| Club of the Year | (Germany) Bayern Munich | — |
| Top Title Winners in the Middle East | (Egypt) Al Ahly | — |
| Agent of the Century 2001–2020 | (Portugal) Jorge Mendes | — |
| Player Career Award | (Spain) Iker Casillas | — |
| Player Career Award | (Spain) Gerard Piqué | — |

=== 2021 ===
- In December 2021, 17 awards were awarded in Dubai:

| Award | Winner | Team(s) |
|---|---|---|
| Best Men's Player of the Year | (France) Kylian Mbappé | (France) Paris Saint-Germain |
| Top Goal Scorer of All Time | (Portugal) Cristiano Ronaldo | (Italy) Juventus (England) Manchester United |
| Maradona Award for Best Goal Scorer of the Year | (Poland) Robert Lewandowski | (Germany) Bayern Munich |
| TikTok Fans' Player of the Year | (Poland) Robert Lewandowski | (Germany) Bayern Munich |
| Best Coach of the Year | (Italy) Roberto Mancini | Italy |
| Best Defender of the Year | (Italy) Leonardo Bonucci | (Italy) Juventus |
| Best Goalkeeper of the Year | (Italy) Gianluigi Donnarumma | (Italy) Milan (France) Paris Saint-Germain |
| Best Women's Player of the Year | (Spain) Alexia Putellas | (Spain) Barcelona |
| Player Career Award | (Brazil) Ronaldinho | — |
| Best Men's Club of the Year | (England) Chelsea | — |
| Best Women's Club of the Year | (Spain) Barcelona | — |
| Best Youth Academy in Africa | (Egypt) ZED | — |
| Best Agent of the Year | (Italy) Federico Pastorello | — |
| Special Innovation award | (Italy) Serie A | — |
| Best Esports player of the Year | (Saudi Arabia) Msdossary7 | — |
| Best Sporting Director of the Year | (Spain) Txiki Begiristain | (England) Manchester City |
| Best National Team of the Year | Italy | — |

=== 2022 ===
- On 17 November 2022, the following 17 awards were awarded in Dubai:

| Award | Winner | Team(s) |
|---|---|---|
| Best Men's Player of the Year | (France) Karim Benzema | (Spain) Real Madrid |
| TikTok Fans' Player of the Year | (Egypt) Mohamed Salah | (England) Liverpool |
| Best Women's Player of the Year | (Spain) Alexia Putellas | (Spain) Barcelona |
| Best Defender of All Time | (Spain) Sergio Ramos | — |
| Executive Career Award | (Italy) Adriano Galliani | — |
| Coach Career Award | (Spain) Unai Emery | — |
| Best Youth Team of the Year | (Portugal) Benfica | — |
| Best Transfer Deal of the Year | (Norway) Erling Haaland | (England) Manchester City |
| Best Scout of the Year | (Spain) Juni Calafat | (Spain) Real Madrid |
| Best Sporting Director of the Year | (Italy) Paolo Maldini (Italy) Frederic Massara | (Italy) Milan |
| Best President of the Year | (Spain) Florentino Pérez | (Spain) Real Madrid |
| Best Coach of the Year | (Italy) Carlo Ancelotti | (Spain) Real Madrid |
| Best Women's Club of the Year | (France) Lyon | — |
| Best Men's Club of the Year | (Spain) Real Madrid | — |
| Emerging Player of the Year | (Nigeria) Victor Osimhen | (Italy) Napoli |
| Best Agent of the Year | (Portugal) Jorge Mendes | — |
| CNN Off the Pitch Award | (Ivory Coast) Didier Drogba Foundation | — |
| Best Executive of the Year | (Spain) Jose Angel Sanchez | (Spain) Real Madrid |
| Agent Career Award | (Spain) René Ramos | — |
| Player Career Award | (England) Wayne Rooney | — |
| Player Career Award | (Sweden) Zlatan Ibrahimović | — |
| Player Career Award | (Brazil) Romário | — |

Digital Awards Winners

- Recipients of 2022 Digital Awards were:

| Award | Winner |
|---|---|
| Best Football YouTube Creator | (Spain) Zabalive |
| Best Football Esports Player | (Portugal) Tuga810 |
| Best Football Social Media Influencer | (Senegal) (Italy) Khaby Lame |
| Best Football TikTok Creator | (Oman) Alnoufali_7 |
| Best Football Journalist | (Italy) Fabrizio Romano |

=== 2023 ===
- On 19 January 2024, the following 18 awards were awarded in Dubai for the calendar year 2023:

| Award | Winner | Team(s) |
|---|---|---|
| Best Men's Player of the Year | (Norway) Erling Haaland | (England) Manchester City |
| Fans' Favourite Player of the Year | (Portugal) Cristiano Ronaldo | (Saudi Arabia) Al-Nassr |
| Best Women's Player of the Year | (Spain) Aitana Bonmatí | (Spain) Barcelona |
| Best Middle East Player | (Portugal) Cristiano Ronaldo | (Saudi Arabia) Al-Nassr |
| Best Men's Club of the Year | (England) Manchester City | — |
| Maradona Award for Best Goal Scorer of the Year | (Portugal) Cristiano Ronaldo | (Saudi Arabia) Al-Nassr |
| Best Coach of the Year | (Spain) Pep Guardiola | (England) Manchester City |
| Best President | (United Arab Emirates) Khaldoon Al Mubarak | (England) Manchester City |
| Best Women's Club of the Year | (Spain) Barcelona | — |
| Power House Emerging Player | (England) Jude Bellingham | (Germany) Borussia Dortmund (Spain) Real Madrid |
| Best Midfielder of the Year | (Spain) Rodri | (England) Manchester City |
| Best Goalkeeper of the Year | (Brazil) Ederson | (England) Manchester City |
| Player Career Award | (Brazil) Casemiro | (England) Manchester United |
| Best Agent of the Year | (Portugal) Jorge Mendes | — |
| Player Career Award | (England) John Terry | — |
| Best Sporting Director | (Italy) Cristiano Giuntoli | (Italy) Napoli (Italy) Juventus |
| Coach Career Award | (Argentina) Lionel Scaloni | Argentina |
| Best Middle East Club | (Egypt) Al Ahly | — |

Digital Awards Winners

- Recipients of 2023 Digital Awards were:

| Award | Winner |
|---|---|
| Best Video Creator | (Iran) Asgari_freestyle |
| Best Esports Player | (Saudi Arabia) Msdossary7 |
| Best Digital Journalist | (Italy) Fabrizio Romano |
| Best Social Media Influencer | (Oman) Alnoufali_7 |
| Serie A - Best Content by a Player | (Portugal) Rafael Leão |
| Serie A - Best Digital Content | (Italy) Roma |
| Best Middle East Media Company | (Saudi Arabia) Saudi Media Company |
| Best Middle East Academy | (Egypt) ZED |

=== 2024 – Europe Edition ===
- On 29 May 2024, the following 14 awards were awarded in Sardinia, Italy for the calendar year 2024 in the first Europe Edition:

| Award | Winner | Team(s) |
|---|---|---|
| Best Men's Player of the Year | (France) Kylian Mbappé | (France) Paris Saint-Germain |
| Best Men's Club of the Year | (England) Manchester City | — |
| Best Women's Club of the Year | (Spain) Barcelona | — |
| Best Coach of the Year | (Spain) Xabi Alonso | (Germany) Bayer Leverkusen |
| Coach Career Award | (Italy) Luciano Spalletti | Italy |
| Player Career Award | (Italy) Gianluigi Buffon | — |
| Best Coach Premier League | (Spain) Mikel Arteta | (England) Arsenal |
| Revelation Award | (Italy) Atalanta | — |
| Comeback Award | (Italy) Como | — |
| Football Leadership Award | (Qatar) Nasser Al-Khelaifi | (France) Paris Saint-Germain |
| Special Career Award | (Germany) Karl-Heinz Rummenigge | — |
| Special Career Award | (Italy) Gigi Riva | — |
| Emerging Player | (Spain) Lamine Yamal | (Spain) Barcelona |
| Sportsmanship Award | (Italy) Gianluca Pessotto | — |
| Best Goal Scorer | (England) Harry Kane | (Germany) Bayern Munich |

=== 2024 ===
- On 27 December 2024, the following 21 awards were awarded in Dubai for the calendar year 2024:

| Award | Winner | Team(s) |
|---|---|---|
| Best Men's Player of the Year | (Brazil) Vinícius Júnior | (Spain) Real Madrid |
| Best Women's Player of the Year | (Spain) Aitana Bonmatí | (Spain) Barcelona |
| Best Coach of the Year | (Italy) Carlo Ancelotti | (Spain) Real Madrid |
| Best Europe Player | (France) Kylian Mbappé | (Spain) Real Madrid |
| Best Middle East Player | (Portugal) Cristiano Ronaldo | (Saudi Arabia) Al-Nassr |
| Best Middle East Coach | (Portugal) Jorge Jesus | (Saudi Arabia) Al-Hilal |
| Top Goal Scorer of All Time | (Portugal) Cristiano Ronaldo | (Saudi Arabia) Al-Nassr |
| Club Revelation Award | (Greece) Olympiacos | — |
| Best Men's Club of the Year | (Spain) Real Madrid | — |
| Best Women's Club of the Year | (Spain) Barcelona | — |
| Best Midfielder of the Year | (England) Jude Bellingham | (Spain) Real Madrid |
| Best Forward of the Year | (Brazil) Vinícius Júnior | (Spain) Real Madrid |
| Best Sporting Director of the Year | (Italy) Piero Ausilio | (Italy) Inter Milan |
| Best Agent of the Year | (Portugal) Jorge Mendes | — |
| Best Middle East Club of the Year | (United Arab Emirates) Al Ain | — |
| Emerging Player | (Spain) Lamine Yamal | (Spain) Barcelona |
| Maradona Award | (England) Jude Bellingham | (Spain) Real Madrid |
| Special Career Award | (Spain) Florentino Pérez | — |
| Special Career Award | (Italy) Alessandro Del Piero | — |
| Player Career Award | (Belgium) Thibaut Courtois | — |
| Player Career Award | (Brazil) Neymar | — |
| Player Career Award | (England) Rio Ferdinand | — |

=== 2025 ===
- On 28 December 2025, the following awards were awarded in Dubai for the calendar year 2025:
- A Special Award was awarded in honour of Liverpool FC player Diogo Jota, who died on 3 July 2025 in a car accident.

| Award | Winner | Team(s) |
|---|---|---|
| Globe Sports Award | (Serbia) Novak Djokovic | — |
| Best Men's Player of the Year | (France) Ousmane Dembélé | (France) Paris Saint-Germain |
| Best Women's Player of the Year | (Spain) Aitana Bonmatí | (Spain) Barcelona |
| Best Coach of the Year | (Spain) Luis Enrique | (France) Paris Saint-Germain |
| Best Emerging Player | (France) Désiré Doué | (France) Paris Saint-Germain |
| Best Middle East Player | (Portugal) Cristiano Ronaldo | (Saudi Arabia) Al-Nassr |
| Best Men's Club of the Year | (France) Paris Saint-Germain | — |
| Best Women's Club of the Year | (Spain) Barcelona | — |
| Best Midfielder of the Year | (Portugal) Vitinha | (France) Paris Saint-Germain |
| Best Forward of the Year | (Spain) Lamine Yamal | (Spain) Barcelona |
| Best Sporting Director of the Year | (Portugal) Luís Campos | (France) Paris Saint-Germain |
| Best Agent of the Year | (Portugal) Jorge Mendes | — |
| Best Sports President | (Qatar) Nasser Al-Khelaïfi | (France) Paris Saint-Germain |
| Best Content Creator | (Lebanon) Bilal Haddad | — |
| Maradona Award | (Spain) Lamine Yamal | (Spain) Barcelona |
| Best Academy | (Ghana) Right to Dream Academy | — |
| Best Sports Comeback | (France) Paul Pogba | (France) Monaco |
| Best National Football Team | Portugal | — |
| Best Sports Branding | (United States) LAFC | — |
| Best Mental Coach | (Italy) Nicoletta Romanazzi | — |
| Player Career Award | (Japan) Hidetoshi Nakata | — |
| Player Career Award | (Spain) Andrés Iniesta | — |

== Awards of the Century ==
=== Player of the 20th century ===
At the 2012 Globe Soccer Awards ceremony, the organisation decided to award a special award to recognise the best Player of the 20th Century. The award was given to Diego Maradona, who played for Argentinos Juniors, Boca Juniors, (Spain) Barcelona, (Italy) Napoli, (Spain) Sevilla, Newell's Old Boys, and Argentina.

=== 21st Century Awards ===
Similarly, at the Globe Soccer 2020 Awards ceremony, the organization decided to simultaneously award a series of special awards known as the 21st Century Awards, which seek to recognize the most important figures in football from 2001 to 2025. The award ceremony was attended by different personalities linked to the world of football, which highlights the president of FIFA Gianni Infantino who had delivered a speech at the conference.

- Player of the 21st century: Cristiano Ronaldo ( Sporting CP/ (England) Manchester United/ (Spain) Real Madrid/ (Italy) Juventus/ (Saudi Arabia) Al-Nassr/Portugal)
- Coach of the 21st Century: (Spain) Pep Guardiola ( (Spain) Barcelona/ (Germany) Bayern Munich/ (England) Manchester City)
- Club of the 21st Century: (Spain) Real Madrid
- Agent of the 21st Century: (Portugal) Jorge Mendes

==== Player of 21st century: votes ====
The results of the internet Poll on 28 December 2020 for the best players of the 21st century (2001–2025), with just six players collecting over 1%, were as follows.

| Rank | Player | Nationality | Percentage |
|---|---|---|---|
| 1 | Cristiano Ronaldo | Portugal | 38% |
| 2 | Lionel Messi | Argentina | 24% |
| 3 | Mohamed Salah | Egypt | 23% |
| 4 | Ronaldinho | Brazil | 14% |
| 5 | Robert Lewandowski | Poland | 4% |
| 6 | Zinedine Zidane | France | 2% |
| 7 | Andrés Iniesta | Spain | 1% |
| 8 | Andriy Shevchenko | Ukraine | 1% |
| 9 | Francesco Totti | Italy | 1% |
| 10 | Neymar | Brazil | 1% |
| 11 | Ronaldo | Brazil | 1% |
| 12 | Sergio Ramos | Spain | 1% |
| 13 | Steven Gerrard | England | 1% |
| 14 | Zlatan Ibrahimović | Sweden | 1% |

==== Coach of 21st century: votes ====
The results of the internet Poll on 28 December 2020 for the best coach of the 21st century (2001–2020), were as follows.

| Rank | Coach | Nationality | Percentage |
|---|---|---|---|
| 1 | Pep Guardiola | Spain | 34% |
| 2 | Zinedine Zidane | France | 30% |
| 3 | Alex Ferguson | Scotland | 27% |
| 4 | José Mourinho | Portugal | 8% |

==== Agent of 21st century: votes ====
The results of the internet Poll on 28 December 2020 for the best agent of the 21st century (2001–2020), were as follows.

| Rank | Agent | Nationality | Percentage |
|---|---|---|---|
| 1 | Jorge Mendes | Portugal | 66% |
| 2 | Mino Raiola | Netherlands | 22% |
| 3 | Giovanni Branchini | Italy | 13% |

==== Club of 21st century: votes ====
The results of the internet Poll on 28 December 2020 for the best club of the 21st century (2001–2020), were as follows.

| Rank | Club | Nationality | Percentage |
|---|---|---|---|
| 1 | Real Madrid | Spain | 36% |
| 2 | Al Ahly | Egypt | 32% |
| 3 | Barcelona | Spain | 18% |
| 4 | Bayern Munich | Germany | 14% |

== Best Player of the Year Award ==
=== Winners ===
| Year | Player | Club |
|---|---|---|
| 2011 | (Portugal) Cristiano Ronaldo | (Spain) Real Madrid |
| 2012 | (Colombia) Radamel Falcao | (Spain) Atlético Madrid |
| 2013 | (France) Franck Ribéry | (Germany) Bayern Munich |
| 2014 | (Portugal) Cristiano Ronaldo (2) | (Spain) Real Madrid |
| 2015 | (Argentina) Lionel Messi | (Spain) Barcelona |
| 2016 | (Portugal) Cristiano Ronaldo (3) | (Spain) Real Madrid |
| 2017 | (Portugal) Cristiano Ronaldo (4) | (Spain) Real Madrid |
| 2018 | (Portugal) Cristiano Ronaldo (5) | (Spain) Real Madrid |
| 2019 | (Portugal) Cristiano Ronaldo (6) | (Italy) Juventus |
| 2020 | (Poland) Robert Lewandowski | (Germany) Bayern Munich |
| 2021 | (France) Kylian Mbappé | (France) Paris Saint-Germain |
| 2022 | (France) Karim Benzema | (Spain) Real Madrid |
| 2023 | (Norway) Erling Haaland | (England) Manchester City |
| 2024 | (Brazil) Vinícius Júnior | (Spain) Real Madrid |
| 2025 | (France) Ousmane Dembélé | (France) Paris Saint-Germain |

=== By player ===
| Rank | Player | Wins |
|---|---|---|
| 1 | (Portugal) Cristiano Ronaldo | 6 |
| 2 | (Colombia) Radamel Falcao | 1 |
| 2 | (France) Ousmane Dembélé | 1 |
| 2 | (France) Franck Ribéry | 1 |
| 2 | (France) Kylian Mbappé | 1 |
| 2 | (Poland) Robert Lewandowski | 1 |
| 2 | (Argentina) Lionel Messi | 1 |
| 2 | (France) Karim Benzema | 1 |
| 2 | (Brazil) Vinícius Júnior | 1 |
| 2 | (Norway) Erling Haaland | 1 |

=== Annual rankings ===
| Year | Rank | Player | Club | Votes |
|---|---|---|---|---|
| 2018 | 1st | (Portugal) Cristiano Ronaldo | (Italy) Juventus | N/A |
| 2018 | – | (France) Kylian Mbappé | (France) Paris Saint-Germain | N/A |
| 2018 | – | (France) Antoine Griezmann | (Spain) Atlético Madrid | N/A |
| 2019 | 1st | (Portugal) Cristiano Ronaldo | (Italy) Juventus | N/A |
| 2019 | – | (Egypt) Mohamed Salah | (England) Liverpool | N/A |
| 2019 | – | (Argentina) Lionel Messi | (Spain) Barcelona | N/A |
| 2019 | – | (Netherlands) Virgil van Dijk | (England) Liverpool | N/A |
| 2020 | 1st | (Portugal) Cristiano Ronaldo | (Italy) Juventus | 42.2% |
| 2020 | 2nd | (Poland) Robert Lewandowski | (Germany) Bayern Munich | 38% |
| 2020 | 3rd | (Argentina) Lionel Messi | (Spain) Barcelona | 20% |
| 2021 | 1st | (France) Kylian Mbappé | (France) Paris Saint-Germain | N/A |
| 2021 | 2nd | (Poland) Robert Lewandowski | (Germany) Bayern Munich | N/A |
| 2021 | 3rd | (Portugal) Cristiano Ronaldo | (England) Manchester United | N/A |
| 2022 | 1st | (France) Karim Benzema | (Spain) Real Madrid | N/A |
| 2022 | 2nd | (Norway) Erling Haaland | (England) Manchester City | N/A |
| 2022 | 3rd | (Egypt) Mohamed Salah | (England) Liverpool | N/A |
| 2023 | 1st | (Norway) Erling Haaland | (England) Manchester City | N/A |
| 2023 | 2nd | (Portugal) Cristiano Ronaldo | (Saudi Arabia) Al-Nassr | N/A |
| 2023 | 3rd | (Argentina) Lionel Messi | (United States) Inter Miami | N/A |

=== Europe edition – Player of the Year ===
| Season | Player | Club |
|---|---|---|
| 2023–24 | (France) Kylian Mbappe | (France) Paris Saint-Germain |

=== Arab Player of the Year ===
| Year | Player | Club |
|---|---|---|
| 2014 | (Morocco) Medhi Benatia | (Germany) Bayern Munich |
| 2015 | (Egypt) Mohamed Salah | (Italy) Roma |
| 2019 | (Morocco) Abderrazak Hamdallah | (Saudi Arabia) Al-Nassr |

=== Middle East Player of the Year ===
| Year | Player | Club |
|---|---|---|
| 2023 | (Portugal) Cristiano Ronaldo | (Saudi Arabia) Al-Nassr |
| 2024 | (Portugal) Cristiano Ronaldo | (Saudi Arabia) Al-Nassr |
| 2025 | (Portugal) Cristiano Ronaldo | (Saudi Arabia) Al-Nassr |

== Emerging Player of the Year Award ==
=== Winners ===
| Year | Player | Club |
|---|---|---|
| 2022 | (Nigeria) Victor Osimhen | (Italy) Napoli |
| 2023 | (England) Jude Bellingham | (Germany) Borussia Dortmund (Spain) Real Madrid |
| 2024 | (Spain) Lamine Yamal | (Spain) Barcelona |
| 2025 | (France) Désiré Doué | (France) Paris Saint-Germain |

== Best Coach of the Year Award ==
=== By year ===
| Year | Coach | Team |
|---|---|---|
| 2012 | (Portugal) José Mourinho | (Spain) Real Madrid |
| 2013 | (Italy) Antonio Conte | (Italy) Juventus |
| 2014 | (Italy) Carlo Ancelotti | (Spain) Real Madrid |
| 2015 | (Belgium) Marc Wilmots | Belgium |
| 2016 | (Portugal) Fernando Santos | Portugal |
| 2017 | (France) Zinedine Zidane | (Spain) Real Madrid |
| 2018 | (France) Didier Deschamps | France |
| 2019 | (Germany) Jürgen Klopp | (England) Liverpool |
| 2020 | (Germany) Hansi Flick | (Germany) Bayern Munich |
| 2021 | (Italy) Roberto Mancini | Italy |
| 2022 | (Italy) Carlo Ancelotti (2) | (Spain) Real Madrid |
| 2023 | (Spain) Pep Guardiola | (England) Manchester City |
| 2024 | (Italy) Carlo Ancelotti (3) | (Spain) Real Madrid |
| 2025 | (Spain) Luis Enrique | (France) Paris Saint-Germain |

=== By coach ===
| Rank | Coach | Wins |
|---|---|---|
| 1 | (Italy) Carlo Ancelotti | 3 |
| 2 | (Portugal) José Mourinho | 1 |
| 2 | (Italy) Antonio Conte | 1 |
| 2 | (Belgium) Marc Wilmots | 1 |
| 2 | (Portugal) Fernando Santos | 1 |
| 2 | (France) Zinedine Zidane | 1 |
| 2 | (France) Didier Deschamps | 1 |
| 2 | (Germany) Jürgen Klopp | 1 |
| 2 | (Germany) Hansi Flick | 1 |
| 2 | (Italy) Roberto Mancini | 1 |
| 2 | (Spain) Luis Enrique | 1 |
| 2 | (Spain) Pep Guardiola | 1 |

== Best Agent of the Year Award ==
=== By year ===
| Year | Agent |
|---|---|
| 2010 | (Portugal) Jorge Mendes |
| 2011 | (Portugal) Jorge Mendes (2) |
| 2012 | (Portugal) Jorge Mendes (3) |
| 2013 | (Portugal) Jorge Mendes (4) |
| 2014 | (Portugal) Jorge Mendes (5) |
| 2015 | (Portugal) Jorge Mendes (6) |
| 2016 | (Italy) (Netherlands) Mino Raiola |
| 2017 | (Portugal) Jorge Mendes (7) |
| 2018 | (Portugal) Jorge Mendes (8) |
| 2019 | (Portugal) Jorge Mendes (9) |
| 2021 | (Italy) Federico Pastorello |
| 2022 | (Portugal) Jorge Mendes (10) |
| 2023 | (Portugal) Jorge Mendes (11) |
| 2024 | (Portugal) Jorge Mendes (12) |
| 2025 | (Portugal) Jorge Mendes (13) |

=== By agent ===
| Rank | Agent | Wins |
|---|---|---|
| 1 | (Portugal) Jorge Mendes | 13 |
| 2 | (Italy) (Netherlands) Mino Raiola | 1 |
| 2 | (Italy) Federico Pastorello | 1 |

== Best Club of the Year Award ==
=== By men's year ===
| Year | Club |
|---|---|
| 2011 | (Spain) Barcelona |
| 2012 | (Spain) Atlético Madrid |
| 2013 | (Germany) Bayern Munich |
| 2014 | (Spain) Real Madrid |
| 2015 | (Spain) Barcelona (2) |
| 2016 | (Spain) Real Madrid (2) |
| 2017 | (Spain) Real Madrid (3) |
| 2018 | (Spain) Atlético Madrid (2) |
| 2019 | (England) Liverpool |
| 2020 | (Germany) Bayern Munich (2) |
| 2021 | (England) Chelsea |
| 2022 | (Spain) Real Madrid (4) |
| 2023 | (England) Manchester City |
| 2024 | (Spain) Real Madrid (5) |
| 2025 | (France) Paris Saint-Germain |

=== By men's team ===
| Rank | Team | Wins |
|---|---|---|
| 1 | (Spain) Real Madrid | 5 |
| 2 | (Spain) Atlético Madrid | 2 |
| 2 | (Spain) Barcelona | 2 |
| 2 | (Germany) Bayern Munich | 2 |
| 5 | (England) Chelsea | 1 |
| 5 | (England) Liverpool | 1 |
| 5 | (England) Manchester City | 1 |
| 5 | (France) Paris Saint-Germain | 1 |

=== By women's year ===
| Year | Club |
|---|---|
| 2021 | (Spain) Barcelona |
| 2022 | (France) Lyon |
| 2023 | (Spain) Barcelona (2) |
| 2024 | (Spain) Barcelona (3) |
| 2025 | (Spain) Barcelona (4) |

=== By women's team ===
| Rank | Team | Wins |
|---|---|---|
| 1 | (Spain) Barcelona | 4 |
| 2 | (France) Lyon | 1 |

== See also ==
- Ballon d'Or
- The Best FIFA Football Awards
- FIFA Fair Play Award
- FIFPro World11
- UEFA Club Footballer of the Year
- UEFA Men's Player of the Year Award
- UEFA Women's Player of the Year Award
- Bravo Award
- Golden Boy
- Golden Player
