= Silva International Investments =

British investment company

- Company type: Private
- Industry: Private equity
- Founded: 1 May 2015; 11 years ago
- Founder: Riccardo Silva
- Headquarters: Mayfair, London, United Kingdom
- Number of locations: 3 (2018)
- Key people: Riccardo Silva (Owner); Marco Auletta (CEO)
- Products: Growth capital
- Number of employees: 20+ (2018)
- Website: silvainternational.com

Silva International Investments is a London-based investment company, founded on 1 May 2015 by Riccardo Silva. The firm manages and invests in assets across multiple sectors, including media, sport, fashion, technology and real estate.

== Investment profile ==
Silva International Investments hosts a growing portfolio.

=== Mast Capital ===
In February 2017 Silva International invested in Miami based real estate company Mast Capital.

=== SportBusiness ===
August 2017 saw Silva International Investments acquire SportBusiness, who provide insight into businesses working in the sports industry throughout the world.

The company has a monthly audience of 130,000 reached through email and social media channels. In February 2018 SportBusiness expanded its coverage into the Americas, with the announcement of the establishment of an office in Miami, Florida, its first outside the UK.

=== The Miami FC ===
Silva International Investments also owns The Miami FC who began to play in the North American Soccer League (NASL) in 2016. In the 2017 season, they won the spring-season and autumn-season NASL Championships but lost in the Semifinal playoff against New York Cosmos. In August 2019 The Miami FC won the NPSL National Championship, defending the title the club won in 2018.

In September 2019, the team joined the National Independent Soccer Association (NISA), where they took home their 9th trophy after winning the NISA East Coast Championship.

On 11 December 2019, former USL Championship club Ottawa Fury FC announced that it had transferred its franchise rights to The Miami FC ownership group, and the club would begin competition in the league in the 2020 season.

The Miami FC plays its home games at Riccardo Silva Stadium, renamed in April 2017 in recognition of the support Riccardo Silva to the FIU Department of Intercollegiate Athletics since 2015.

=== Globe Soccer ===
In December 2017, Silva International Investments announced the acquisition of the majority stake in Globe Soccer Awards.

=== Select Model Management ===
In October 2019 the company acquired the London modelling agency, Select Model Management, and announced a major global expansion driven through an integration with Silva International Investment's existing modelling agency network, MP Management.

Following MP Management's establishment in 2008 in Milan, the company acquired a second agency in Miami in 2014, quickly followed with the acquisition of a third agency, Major Paris, in 2015. Under the ownership of Silva International Investments, the group continued to grow, with the acquisition of Elite Stockholm in 2017, and in the same year, with the establishment of a strategic partnership with Modellink in Gothenburg. This was followed in 2018 with the acquisition of the Factor Chosen Group, which brought into the network agencies in Chicago, Los Angeles and Atlanta. With the acquisition of Select, the network expanded to London, with the group now spanning eight agencies.

== Current investments ==
- Mast Capital - Real estate investment
- SportBusiness - B2B, sport publication, data & analysis
- Miami FC - Owner of The Miami FC
- Muzik - Advanced wireless headphones
- Select Model Management - Global model and talent management
- Globe Soccer - Annual soccer awards given for excellence in football
- Helbiz - Micromobility solutions for urban areas around the world

== Leadership ==
Silva International Investments is owned by Riccardo Silva and the CEO is Marco Auletta. Marco is a trained lawyer, investment specialist and has worked to bring The Premier League, Formula 1, the French Open and the NFL to UK audiences as the CEO of MP & Silva.

== See also ==
- Riccardo Silva
- Miami FC
