= Ariza Makukula =

Footballer (born 1981)

Personal information
- Date of birth: 4 March 1981 (age 45)
- Place of birth: Kinshasa, Zaire
- Height: 1.90 m (6 ft 3 in)
- Position: Centre-forward

Youth career
- 1991–1992: Vitória Setúbal
- 1992–1993: Chaves
- 1993–2000: Vitória Guimarães
- 1996–1997: → Brito (loan)

Senior career*
| Years | Team | Apps | (Gls) |
| 2000–2002 | Salamanca | 40 | (20) |
| 2001 | → Leganés (loan) | 13 | (4) |
| 2002–2004 | Nantes | 18 | (1) |
| 2003–2004 | → Valladolid (loan) | 18 | (8) |
| 2004–2008 | Sevilla | 13 | (1) |
| 2006–2007 | → Gimnàstic (loan) | 12 | (1) |
| 2007–2008 | → Marítimo (loan) | 13 | (7) |
| 2008–2010 | Benfica | 3 | (0) |
| 2009 | → Bolton Wanderers (loan) | 6 | (0) |
| 2009–2010 | → Kayserispor (loan) | 29 | (21) |
| 2010–2012 | Manisaspor | 39 | (5) |
| 2012–2013 | Karşıyaka | 10 | (3) |
| 2013 | Vitória Setúbal | 10 | (2) |
| 2013 | OFI | 9 | (2) |
| 2014 | BEC Tero Sasana | 0 | (0) |
| Total | | 233 | (75) |

International career
| 2002–2003 | Portugal U21 | 14 | (4) |
| 2004 | Portugal B | 1 | (0) |
| 2007–2008 | Portugal | 4 | (1) |
- * Club domestic league appearances and goals

Ariza Makukula (born 4 March 1981) is a former professional footballer who played as a centre-forward.

He amassed Primeira Liga totals of 26 matches and nine goals over three seasons for Marítimo, Benfica and Vitória de Setúbal, spending the vast majority of his career abroad. He competed in Spain, England, Turkey, Greece and Thailand, winning the UEFA Cup with Sevilla in 2006 and being Süper Lig top scorer with Kayserispor in 2009–10.

Born in Zaire, Makukula earned four caps for the Portugal national team in three and a half months.

== Club career ==
=== Early career ===
The son of Kuyangana Makukula, a Congolese footballer who spent seven years in Portugal with four clubs, mainly Vitória de Setúbal, his mother being Portuguese, Makukula was born in Kinshasa, then in Zaire. He moved to Portugal at age five to live in Matosinhos as his father played for Leixões S.C. and then to Setúbal after the transfer to Vitória, where he began in the youth ranks.

After a spell at G.D. Chaves, Makukula concluded his development at Vitória de Guimarães, where he and César Peixoto were also loaned to nearby Brito SC. Through agent Jorge Mendes and his Gestifute company, he began his professional career in Spain with UD Salamanca and CD Leganés, scoring 20 goals for the former in the 2001–02 season – spent in the Segunda División – second-best in the competition.

=== Nantes ===
While Mendes tried to get Makukula a transfer to teams including Juventus FC, he moved in the summer of 2002 to play with FC Nantes in France on his father's recommendation, having been educated at the Lycée français Charles Lepierre in Lisbon. He split the campaign between the main squad and the reserves and scoring one Ligue 1 goal to equalise in a 2–1 away loss against AS Monaco FC on 11 September 2002. He was subsequently loaned to Real Valladolid, netting eight times but suffering relegation from La Liga; he opened his account in the Spanish top flight with two goals on 27 September 2003 at RC Celta de Vigo, who recovered to win 3–2. His season ended the following January through a knee injury, ruling him out for nearly a full year.

=== Sevilla ===
Makukula was then bought in June 2004 by another side in the same league, Sevilla FC, for an estimated €3.5 million of which 10% went to Salamanca. They beat their city rivals Real Betis to his signature.

Due to his ongoing injury, Makukula did not debut for the Nervión club until 8 January 2005, when he came on as a 56th-minute substitute for Carlitos in a goalless home draw with Getafe CF, in which he was booked. His first goal on 2 February was consolation in a 3–1 loss (4–3 aggregate) away to CA Osasuna in the quarter-finals of the Copa del Rey, followed four days later with his only league goal in a 3–0 away win over Levante UD. On 24 February, he came on in the 79th minute at home to Panathinaikos F.C. as Sevilla trailed 1–0 from the first leg in the UEFA Cup's last 32, and four minutes later scored in an eventual 2–0 victory.

In 2005–06, with Juande Ramos having replaced Joaquín Caparrós as manager, Makukula's injuries continued and he had to deal with the signings of fellow forwards Luís Fabiano, Javier Saviola and Frédéric Kanouté. He played one game all season, 13 minutes and a yellow card in extra time in the UEFA Cup semi-final second leg against FC Schalke 04 on 27 April 2006, after Antonio Puerta had scored the only goal for the eventual champions.

In August 2006, Makukula was loaned Gimnàstic de Tarragona, newly promoted to Spain's main division. He scored his only goal of 14 matches on his sixth appearance on 15 October, coming off the bench in a 3–2 home defeat to Athletic Bilbao. On 27 May 2007, as his team lost 2–0 to Atlético Madrid to be relegated, he was sent off at the Nou Estadi de Tarragona.

=== Benfica ===
In July 2007, Makukula was loaned again to C.S. Marítimo in his adopted nation. He made his Primeira Liga debut on 18 August on the first day of the season at home to F.C. Paços de Ferreira and scored twice in a 3–1 win. On 2 September, also at the Estádio do Marítimo, he scored, was booked for his celebration and sent off for violent conduct towards Paulo Sérgio all in the first seven minutes of a 2–0 victory against Académica de Coimbra.

After seven top-tier goals in only 13 appearances, Makukula transferred to S.L. Benfica for €3.5 million and four and a half years in late January 2008. On 14 February, he scored the game's only goal in a home win against 1. FC Nürnberg in the UEFA Cup round of 32.

Makukula was not used at all in the first part of 2008–09. On 16 January 2009, after a move to West Bromwich Albion fell through, he signed for fellow Premier League team Bolton Wanderers on loan until the end of the campaign with a view to a permanent move costing around £4.5 million in the summer. He made his debut a day later against Manchester United, playing 64 minutes in a 0–1 home loss.

=== Later career ===
On 11 August 2009, Makukula was loaned again, now to Süper Lig club Kayserispor in Turkey. He ended the season as the competition's top scorer, with eight goals more than the second player in an eighth-place finish.

In the very last minutes of the 2010 summer transfer window Makukula signed a three-year deal with another side in the country, Manisaspor, for €2 million. He alleged that he was never paid there and, in summer 2012, he agreed to a contract at another Turkish team, Karşıyaka S.K. in division two. He was released in January of the following year, returning to Portugal after five years and joining Vitória de Setúbal; suffering with knee and meniscus injuries and disputes with the organisation, he cancelled the second year of his contract and did not request compensation for it.

Makukula headed back abroad in September 2013, joining Super League Greece's OFI Crete F.C. on a one-year deal with the option of a second. The following February, he rescinded his contract at the club led by compatriot Ricardo Sá Pinto and joined BEC Tero Sasana F.C. in Thailand. Disappointed by the facilities in Bangkok, he severed his ties two months later and returned to his birth country, becoming sporting director and ambassador of their national team.

== International career ==
Makukula chose to represent Portugal internationally. He started playing for the under-21s, appearing in the 2002 UEFA European Championship.

As a senior, Makukula tried to switch to DR Congo, but a FIFA amended rule regarding international careers came out in 2005, stating that change in nationality representation should occur before a player's 21st birthday and if they have not yet gained their first full cap, so he was denied in his intentions (he was 23 at time of rule, which was abolished in 2009). In October 2007, after solid performances with Marítimo, he was called up to the Portugal squad for a UEFA Euro 2008 qualifier against Kazakhstan on the 17th, after Nuno Gomes suffered an injury: in the 84th minute of the game, he scored the first goal in an eventual 2–1 away win.

Although not part of 24-men Portuguese 2010 FIFA World Cup provisional squad, Makukula was named in a backup list of six players. Ultimately, he did not make the final cut.

== Personal life ==
Makukula met his wife while playing for Nantes, and they had four children before their divorce. He named his first son Aziz Del Nido after Sevilla president José María del Nido Benavente, out of gratitude for signing him while long-term injured.

While buying a house in Lisbon after signing for Benfica, Makukula allowed agent Ricardo Rodrigues to withdraw €200,000 from his bank account. The agent took the cash, while lying that he had been robbed by "four black men" in the problem neighbourhood of Vale da Amoreira. The money was recovered in court.

Makukula, a Catholic, attended mass every Sunday.

== Career statistics ==
=== Club ===
Appearances and goals by club, season and competition
| Club | Season | League | | | National cup | | League cup | | Europe | | Total | |
| Club | Season | Division | Apps | Goals | Apps | Goals | Apps | Goals | Apps | Goals | Apps | Goals |
|---|---|---|---|---|---|---|---|---|---|---|---|---|
| Vitória Guimarães | 1999–00 | Primeira Liga | 0 | 0 | | | – | | – | | | |
| Salamanca | 2000–01 | Segunda División | 2 | 0 | | | – | | – | | | |
| Salamanca | 2001–02 | Segunda División | 38 | 20 | | | – | | – | | | |
| Salamanca | Total | | 40 | 20 | | | 0 | 0 | 0 | 0 | | |
| Leganés (loan) | 2000–01 | Segunda División | 13 | 4 | | | – | | – | | | |
| Nantes | 2002–03 | Ligue 1 | 18 | 1 | | | 2 | 0 | – | | | |
| Valladolid (loan) | 2003–04 | La Liga | 18 | 8 | | | – | | – | | | |
| Sevilla | 2004–05 | La Liga | 13 | 1 | 2 | 0 | – | | 3 | 1 | 18 | 1 |
| Sevilla | 2005–06 | La Liga | 0 | 0 | | | – | | 1 | 0 | | |
| Sevilla | Total | | 13 | 1 | | | 0 | 0 | 4 | 1 | | |
| Gimnàstic (loan) | 2006–07 | La Liga | 12 | 1 | | | – | | – | | | |
| Marítimo (loan) | 2007–08 | Primeira Liga | 13 | 7 | 1 | 0 | 0 | 0 | – | | 14 | 7 |
| Benfica | 2007–08 | Primeira Liga | 3 | 0 | 2 | 1 | 0 | 0 | 3 | 1 | 8 | 2 |
| Benfica | 2008–09 | Primeira Liga | 0 | 0 | 0 | 0 | 0 | 0 | 0 | 0 | 0 | 0 |
| Benfica | Total | | 4 | 0 | 2 | 1 | 0 | 0 | 3 | 1 | 9 | 2 |
| Bolton Wanderers (loan) | 2008–09 | Premier League | 6 | 0 | 0 | 0 | 0 | 0 | – | | 6 | 0 |
| Kayserispor (loan) | 2009–10 | Süper Lig | 29 | 21 | 1 | 0 | – | | – | | 30 | 21 |
| Manisaspor | 2010–11 | Süper Lig | 16 | 4 | 3 | 0 | – | | – | | 19 | 4 |
| Career total | | | 182 | 67 | 7 | 1 | 2 | 0 | 7 | 2 | 198 | 70 |

=== International ===
Scores and results list Portugal's goal tally first, score column indicates score after Makukula goal.

International goal scored by Ariza Makukula
| No. | Date | Venue | Opponent | Score | Result | Competition |
|---|---|---|---|---|---|---|
| 1 | 17 October 2007 | Central Stadium, Almaty, Kazakhstan | Kazakhstan | 1–0 | 2–1 | Euro 2008 qualifying |

== Honours ==
Sevilla

- UEFA Cup: 2005–06
