= Play for Change =

- Formation: 2013
- Type: Non-governmental organization
- Purpose: Education, sport, community empowerment
- Headquarters: London
- Location: London
- Region served: Worldwide
- Founder: Andrea Radrizzani
- Website: http://www.playforchange.org

Play for Change is an international charity (also commonly known as Play for Change Foundation) which focuses on helping children secure a better future through providing funding for primary care, education and access to sports. It was founded in 2010 by Andrea Radrizzani, co-founder of media rights agency MP & Silva.

The charity obtained its official charitable status in 2013. Its main offices are in London with regional offices across the world including the United States.

In under-developed regions, the charity's objectives mainly are to support projects that focus on delivering or improving primary care needs as well as providing access to education and sports.

In Bali, Indonesia, the charity has a children's home – YKPA Play for Change. In 2010, the charity produced TV interviews with football players from the FIFA World Cup in South Africa which raised USD60,000 through media rights deals managed by its corporate partner, MP & Silva. The funds raised were put towards acquiring the children's home.

In developed regions, the charity is beginning to focus mainly on funding or creating projects that are based on providing access to sports educational initiatives, in addition to having an interest in other charitable causes such as healthcare. The charity's Slam Dunk programme uses basketball as a means to build the confidence and life skills of disadvantaged children.
