= Pastorello =

Pastorello is an Italian surname. Notable people with the surname include:

- Federico Pastorello (born 1973), Italian football agent
- Giambattista Pastorello (born 1944), Italian businessman
