= Vadim Vasilyev =

Vadim Vasilyev may refer to:

- Vadim Vasilyev (footballer), born 1972
- Vadim Vasilyev (businessman), born 1965
