= Select Model Management =

Modeling agency

- Company type: Private
- Industry: fashion
- Founded: 1977
- Founder: Clare Castagnetti; Chrissie Castagnetti; Tandy Anderson
- Headquarters: London, UK
- Key people: Matteo Puglisi (CEO)
- Owner: Riccardo Silva
- Website: www.selectmodel.com

Select Model Management is a global network of model and talent agencies. It was established in London in 1977, by founders Tandy Anderson and sisters Clare and Chrissie Castagnetti.

== Company ==
In their early days, Select was one of the first modelling agencies to find models by "scouting" them on the street. They adopted that method of recruitment to quickly establish a client list and reputation. In the 1980s, competitor agencies also used the technique to grow their businesses.

For two seasons (in 2005 and 2006), Anderson served as a judge on Make Me a Supermodel after which the winning competitors received a modelling contract with Select. In 2011, the agency launched a mobile app to be used by prospective models.

In 2019, Select Model Management announced a global expansion through an integration with MP Management.

Select has offices in 8 countries across the world; London, Milano, Paris, Stockholm, Atlanta, Chicago, Los Angeles and Miami.

Select Model Management is part of the Silva International Investments portfolio, owned by Riccardo Silva.

== See also ==
- List of modeling agencies

== Bibliography ==
- Boyd, Marie Anderson: Model: The Complete Guide for Men and Women - Foreword by Clare Castagnetti. London: Collins & Boyd, 1997. ISBN 978-1-8502-8396-6.
