= Riccardo Silva =

Italian businessman and investor (born 1970)

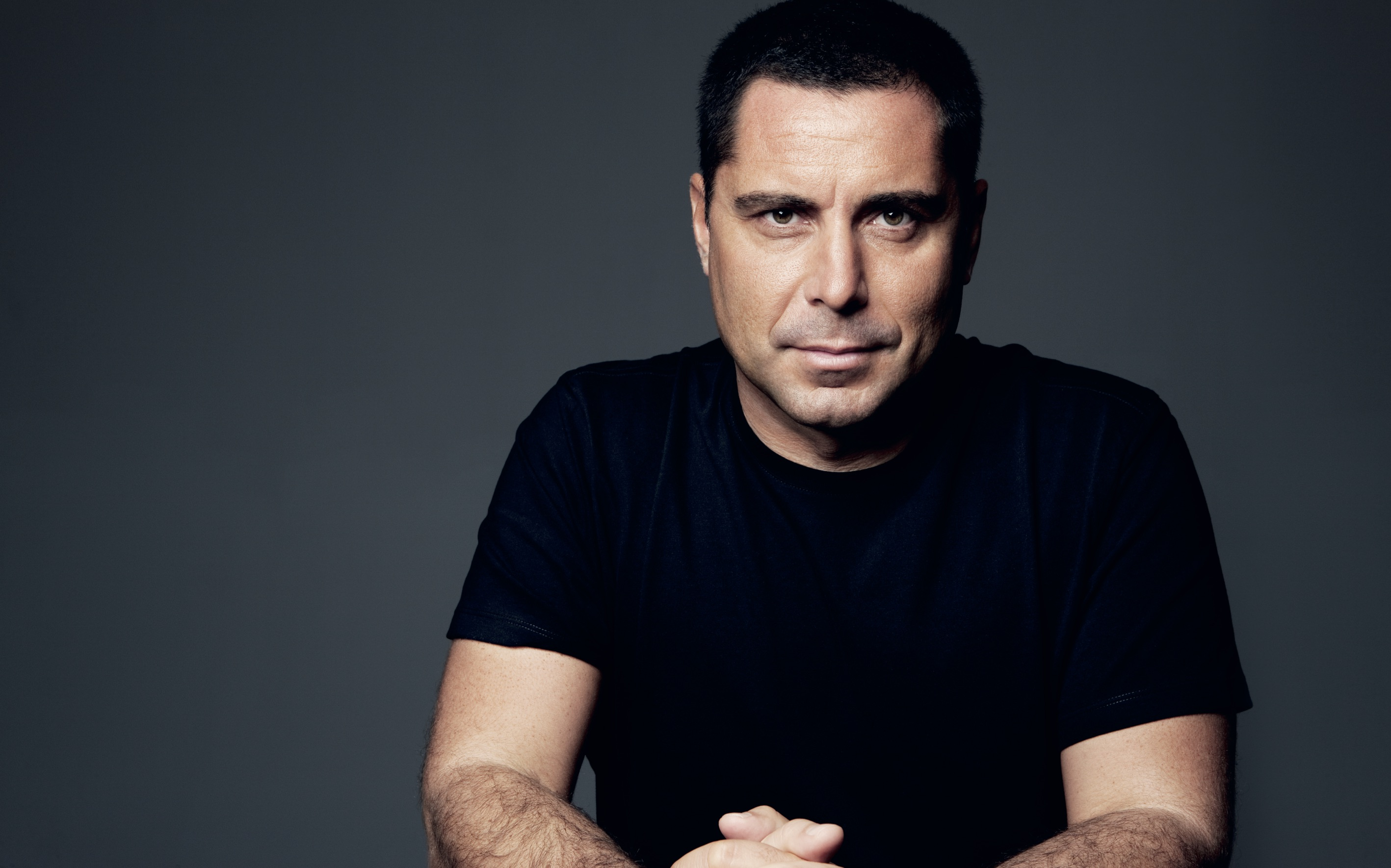
- Silva in September 2016
- Born: 1970 (age 55–56)
- Education: Bocconi University, Tulane University
- Occupations: Owner of Silva International Investments; President and co-owner of Miami FC; Co-owner of AC Milan
- Known for: Riccardo Silva Stadium, MP & Silva, Miami FC, AC Milan, Globe Soccer

Riccardo Silva (born 1970) is an Italian businessman. He is the owner of Silva International Investments, with investments in companies across media, sports, entertainment, art, and real estate. He is also a co-owner of AC Milan, president and co-owner of Miami FC, owner of the Silva family art collection, and was CEO of the Milan Channel.

== Early life and education ==
Riccardo Silva was born in 1970 in Milan, the grandson of the founder of Italsilva – Gruppo Desa, one of Italy's largest chemical groups. His maternal family, Fabbri, is known for its publishing company, Fabbri Editori, which is now part of the RCS Media Group. Silva completed his studies at Bocconi University and Tulane University.

== Early career ==
In 1998 Silva launched MP Web, an internet start-up of the Milan-based Media Partners Group (now Infront Media), managing sports rights and content for mobile and Internet platforms, which first came to prominence in the 1990s. In 2001, Riccardo Silva became CEO of Milan Channel, the official TV channel of the AC Milan football club, and guided the international development of the channel.

== MP & Silva ==
From 2004 until 2016, Silva owned and managed MP & Silva, a global international media rights company based in London. Under Silva's leadership, MP & Silva became the world's leading distributor of TV rights. In May 2016 Silva and his partners sold MP & Silva to the Chinese groups Everbright Securities and Beijing Baofeng Technology, relinquishing management and operational control.

== Silva International Investments ==
In 2016, Silva established Silva International Investments, a portfolio company which invests and manages assets in media, sport, fashion, technology, and real estate.

Since its inception, the company have invested in Mast Capital, a Miami-based real estate and development company and has made a number of acquisitions, including a majority stake in Globe Soccer Awards.

In August 2017, Silva International Investments acquired SportBusiness, who provide insight into businesses working in the sports industry throughout the world.

== Miami FC ==
In May 2015, Silva founded Miami FC, which played in the North American Soccer League (NASL), and from 2020 is in the United Soccer League (USL).

== AC Milan ==
In August 2022, Silva became co-owner of Italian football club AC Milan. He invested in the club in partnership with the US-based fund RedBird and other American investors including the New York Yankees.

== Riccardo Silva Stadium ==
In 2017, Silva made a $3.76 million donation to cover renovations of the team's home field, FIU Stadium at the Florida International University. It was subsequently announced that the stadium would be renamed Riccardo Silva Stadium for five years in recognition of his involvement.

== Other business interests ==
Silva has other business interests in technology, fashion, and arts, including Globe Soccer Awards and in Sports Business. In December 2017, a gallery at the Bass Museum of Art in Miami Beach was renamed the Riccardo and Tatyana Silva Gallery in recognition of the support they have given to the museum and the arts in general.Silva is among the founders and investors of Sports Performance Hub, a $280 million multi-sports academy complex which is under construction in Homestead, near Miami.

== Personal life ==
Riccardo Silva is married to Tatyana Silva, and they have two sons.
