= Andrea Radrizzani =

Italian businessman (born 1974)

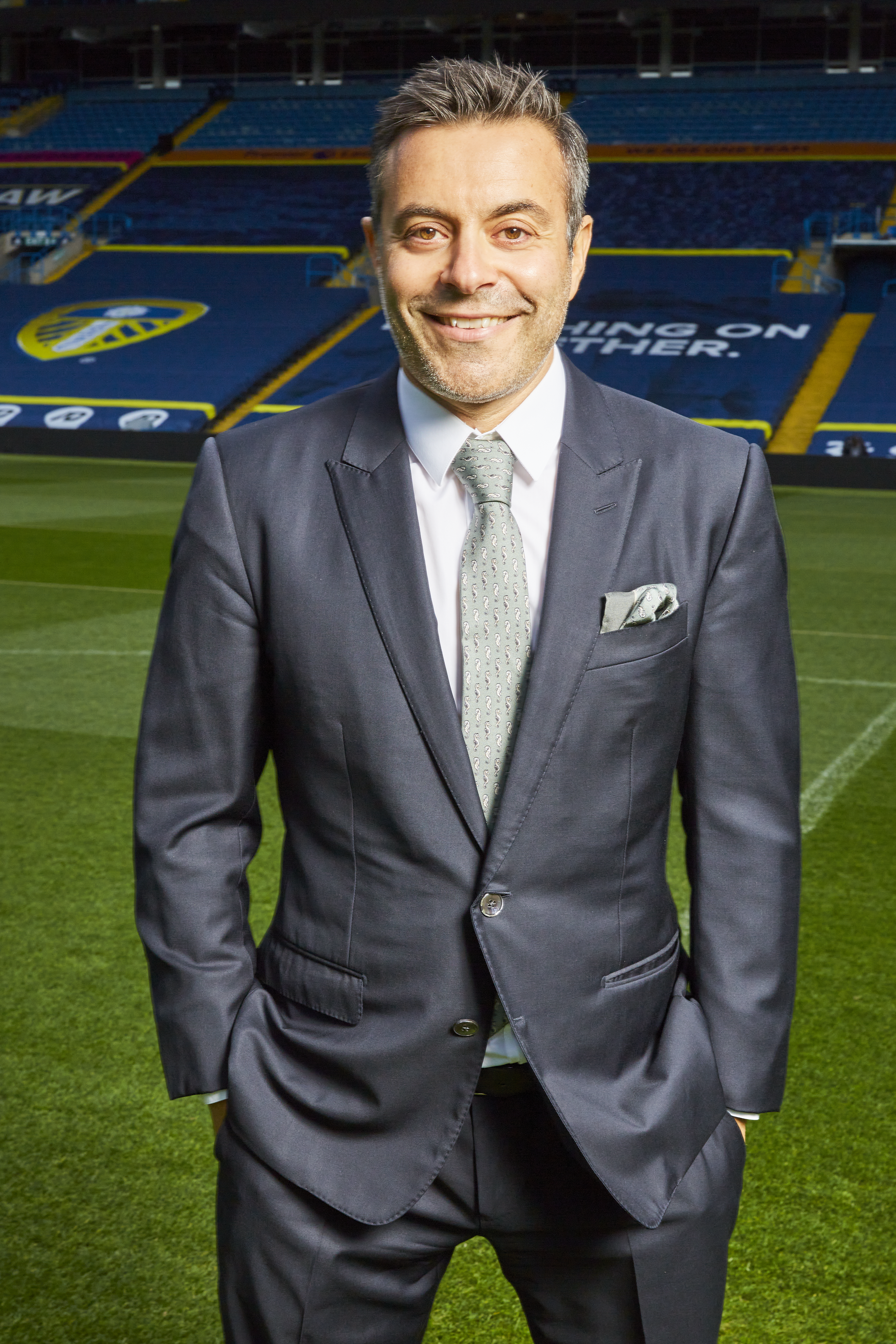
- Radrizzani in 2020
- Born: 10 September 1974 (age 52); Rho, Italy
- Education: Libera Università di Lingue e Comunicazione IULM
- Occupations: Former owner and chairman of Leeds United; Former co-owner of Sampdoria; Former chairman and founder of Eleven Sports
- Website: aser.com

Andrea Radrizzani (born 10 September 1974) is an Italian businessman. He was the chairman and founder of the sports broadcasting group Eleven Sports, and a past owner and chairman of English football club Leeds United and Italian club UC Sampdoria.

== Early life and education ==
Radrizzani was born in Rho, a metropolitan area of Milan. He graduated with a degree in public relations from IULM University in 1996. Growing up passionate about football, he supported Juventus in his childhood and adolescence.

== Early career ==
A self-made businessman, Radrizzani began his career in sports media in 1999 with digital sports content distributor Media Partners and founded Media Partners’ China business.

He co-founded MP & Silva in 2004 from Singapore, which went on to become an international sports rights company with 20 offices around the world, working in partnership with rights holders, including the Premier League, UEFA, F1, La Liga, NBA and WSBC.

Radrizzani led media rights distribution agreements with selected Serie A teams in 2004, before acquiring the rights for the majority of Serie A teams in 2006. MP & Silva went on to build out its European football rights portfolio in Asia. In 2010, Radrizzani negotiated a new media rights partnership with Arsenal. The following year, he helped MP & Silva acquire pan-European rights for the French Open. In 2013, Radrizzani led MP & Silva's negotiations to secure the Premier League's broadcast rights in 51 territories, including the Middle East. The agency also bought Formula One rights in MENA and some selected European countries. Radrizzani was also responsible for leading rights distribution deals with Roland Garros, Bundesliga, La Liga, Ligue 1 among others.

In 2014, Radrizzani stepped back from day-to-day MP & Silva operations. In May 2016, following the $1 billion sale of MP & Silva to a Chinese investment group, Radrizzani was appointed vice chairman of MP & Silva. On 17 October 2018, the High Court ordered the winding-up of MP & Silva.

== Leeds United ==
In January 2017, through Aser, Radrizzani made an investment for 50% of the share capital of Leeds United, making him co-owner of the club.

On 23 May 2017, Radrizzani announced the 100% buyout of Leeds United, buying the remaining 50% shares from previous co-owner Massimo Cellino, with Radrizzani taking full ownership of the club. Radrizzani's ownership of the club got off to a dramatic start; on 25 May, only two days after the takeover, and the day before Leeds were set to activate the option to extend head coach Garry Monk's contract, Monk resigned as Leeds United head coach, with new owner Radrizzani saying that Monk's decision to quit the club had been a 'shock'. After taking over the club he made changes to Leeds' backroom staff, including appointing Victor Orta as director of football, Ivan Bravo as director of strategy and Angus Kinnear as chief executive.

On 15 June 2017, Radrizzani appointed his first head coach when APOEL manager Thomas Christiansen was announced as the new head coach of Leeds United to replace Monk, with the club announcing that they "wanted to appoint someone who can help us create a winning culture at the club and unite everyone connected with Leeds United, from the players to the supporters".

On 26 June, Radrizzani brought back Leeds Ladies to Leeds United ownership to become Leeds United Ladies again after the club had previously become its own entity after previous owner Massimo Cellino decided to stop Leeds United funding in 2014.

On 28 June 2017, Radrizzani completed the purchase of Elland Road, making the stadium the property of Leeds United for the first time since 2004.

On 3 January 2018, Radrizzani announced an official partnership for Leeds with Aspire Academy in Qatar. Aspire own Spanish team Cultural Leonesa who have seen Leeds players Yosuke Ideguchi and Ouasim Bouy both join them on loan as part of the unique partnership.

On 24 January 2018, Radrizzani introduced a new Leeds United badge which would be worn for the 2018/19 season onwards depicting the "Leeds Salute". However, the design of the new badge attracted criticism from huge numbers of fans, resulting in an online petition over 77,000 signatures strong against the design's introduction. Radrizzani and the club decided to "re-open the consultation process" in light of the poor reception the new crest engendered.

On 4 February 2018, head coach Thomas Christiansen was dismissed by Radrizzani, despite a promising start to his reign, after a poor run of results and with the team tenth in the table. On 6 February 2018, Radrizzani appointed Barnsley manager Paul Heckingbottom as the new head coach of Leeds United on an 18-month contract to replace Christiansen.

On 7 March, towards the end of Leeds' 0–3 defeat against Wolverhampton Wanderers, just before the final whistle, Radrizzani in a series of Twitter posts, questioned the legality and fairness of the competition. On 12 March, Radrizzani made public his decision to seek clarity from the Football League regarding league leaders Wolverhampton Wanderers, to seek clarification of the link with Wolves and 'super agent' Jorge Mendes.

In March 2018, Radrizzani announced that Leeds United would be going on a post-season tour of Myanmar in May 2018 to play two friendlies. However, the tour announcement drew criticism nationally and from MP's and Amnesty International due to the political situation in the country. Radrizzani defended the choice of location, declaring that 'This is about people not governments'.

In Radrizzani’s first season as sole owner (2017–18), having been top of the League for the first quarter of the season, and dropping to fifth at the halfway point, Leeds missed out on playoffs completely after a disappointing run of form in the second half of the season, finishing thirteenth in the table.

On 24 May 2018, Radrizzani and Leeds United announced that 49ers Enterprises had bought shares in the club to become a minority investor (49ers Enterprises is the business arm of the NFL side San Francisco 49ers owned by Denise DeBartolo York, Jed York and John York).

Head coach Heckingbottom was sacked by Radrizzani on 1 June 2018, having been at the club for just four months.

Argentine manager Marcelo Bielsa was named by Radrizzani as the club's new head coach on 15 June, signing a two-year contract with option of a third year, after two weeks of negotiations with the club. In doing so he became the highest-paid manager in Leeds United history.

Radrizzani entered late talks to buy Italian Serie B side F.C. Bari 1908 in July 2018, to become a co-owner/investor, but pulled out of the deal, because of a financial deadline due to Bari's financial situation. On 16 July 2018 Radrizzani revealed that “Unfortunately, the short time available to perform detailed and thorough due diligence checks, force us reluctantly to abandon this idea and challenge.”

On 31 July, Radrizzani signed striker Patrick Bamford to Leeds for £7 million (rising up to £10 million), the move representing the highest fee Leeds had spent on a player since Robbie Fowler's move to the club in 2001.

After the sale of promising young player Ronaldo Vieira to Italian side Sampdoria on 1 August, Radrizzani defended the sale to supporters by saying “We cannot buy players and never sell players.”

During the 2018–19 season, Leeds finished the regular season in third place after dropping out of the automatic promotion places with three games left after a defeat to ten-man Wigan Athletic on 19 April, Leeds qualified for the playoffs versus sixth-placed Derby County, winning the first leg of the playoffs 1–0 win at Pride Park, but lost the home leg 2–4 with Leeds also down to ten men after the dismissal of Gaetano Berardi. The loss saw Derby progress 4–3 on aggregate to the final against Aston Villa and Radrizzani's club narrowly miss out on promotion.

In August 2019, Radrizzani was one of the main participants in the Leeds United documentary 'Take Us Home' documenting the 2018–19 season on Amazon Prime, featuring in all episodes. The documentary was narrated by Academy Award-winning actor and Leeds United fan Russell Crowe.

On 23 September 2019, Radrizzani was present at The Best FIFA Football Awards 2019 as Leeds head coach Bielsa and the entire Leeds United squad won the FIFA Fair Play Award: 2019 for Bielsa's sportsmanship in May 2019 to allow Aston Villa to score a goal unopposed in a game in which the ultimate result ended Leeds' 'mathematical' chances of automatic promotion the prior season.

In January 2021, 49ers Enterprises increased its minority stake in Leeds United to 37%, and in November that year, increased its stake to 44%.

The 2021/22 campaign concluded as Leeds survived relegation on the last day of the season with a win over Brentford. Had Burnley beaten Newcastle, Leeds would have been relegated irrespective of Leeds' result vs. Brentford. Radrizzani elected to keep Marsch for the next campaign and directed the fan base to support Marsch: “As a board, we will work hard with Jesse Marsch this summer to improve the squad and find a way to deliver the kind of performances you all deserve. “We believe that with time and a full pre-season, Jesse will be the man to take this club forward.”

In August 2022, in an interview with the Athletic, Radrizzani had claimed that relegation would be "impossible" for Leeds United at the end of the then upcoming 2022/23 season: "I don’t have any doubt that we’ll avoid a situation similar to last season. “It’s [relegation] impossible.” At the end of the 2022/23 Premier League season, Leeds United was relegated.

Despite survival on the last day of the 2021/22 season Leeds United's recruitment in summer 2022 was funded entirely key player sales - with Radrizzani overseeing the sale of Leeds' two best players in the same transfer window. Radrizzani placed significant trust in the club's recruitment strategy to try and ensure premier league survival. Unfortunately, Victor Orta, the then Director of Football, recruitment could be best characterised as 'hit and miss'.

In May 2023, Leeds United was relegated from the Premier League. Radrizzani was, at time, still the majority owner, leaving the club in the second tier of English football, the division the club was in when Radrizzani first purchased a stake in the club from Massimo Cellino.

Radrizzani took over Italian club Sampdoria and saved it from bankruptcy in May 2023. The deal helped clear the way towards Radrizzani's sale of his interest in Leeds United, following the club's relegation from the Premier League.

In June 2023, Radrizzani agreed a £170m deal to sell his majority shareholding in Leeds United to co-owners 49ers Enterprises. The EFL approved the deal on 17 July 2023.

== Sampdoria ==
In May 2023, Radrizzani and business partner Matteo Manfredi took over a troubled Italian football club Sampdoria after shareholders approved a restructuring plan involving a 40 million euros ($44 million) cash injection to shore up the club's finances.

== Play For Change and charity work ==
Radrizzani is also founder and chairman of the Play for Change Foundation, a charity that runs sport and education programmes for children both internationally and in Italy, his home country. Radrizzani was appointed to the UEFA Foundation for Children's Board of Trustees in 2022.

== Legal Issues ==
In November 2022 Radrizzani, his investment arm Aser Media, MP & Silva, and several of his former MP & Silva colleagues were named in a High Court of Justice judgement. Jinxin, a joint venture between China Everbright Group and Beijing Baofeng Technology, acquired 65% of MP & Silva in 2016. After MP & Silva's collapse in 2018, Jinxin made multiple claims of fraud against the defendants. Certain allegations of fraud were subsequently struck out, but Peter MacDonald Eggers KC stated that "Jinxin has a real prospect of succeeding in its claim against MPS LLC" with regard to EBITDA figures allegedly being falsely inflated, and a trial lasting 21 weeks is scheduled for 2025. Radrizzani has since been appointed to DAZN's board.
