= Frederic Massara =

Italian footballer, coach, and director

Personal information
- Full name: Frederic Massara
- Date of birth: 11 November 1968 (age 57)
- Place of birth: Turin, Italy
- Height: 1.78 m (5 ft 10 in)
- Position: Forward

Team information
- Current team: Juventus FC (Chief Football Officer)

Youth career
- Torino

Senior career*
Years	Team	Apps	(Gls)
1986–1987	Torino	0	(0)
1987–1991	Pavia	123	(26)
1991–1994	Pescara	100	(15)
1994–1996	Fidelis Andria	72	(8)
1996–1998	Palermo	51	(4)
1998–1999	Arezzo	27	(6)
1999–2000	Pescara	21	(0)
2000–2001	Moncalieri	30	(2)
2001–2002	Fidelis Andria	8	(0)
2002–2003	Tivoli	7	(1)
- * Club domestic league appearances and goals

Frederic Massara (born 11 November 1968) is an Italian football director, coach and former player. He is the Chief Football Officer of Juventus.

== Club career ==
A quick attacking forward, Massara started his career in the youth ranks of Torino, but never managed to break through the first team and was eventually sold to Serie C1 club Pavia. In 1991 he joined Pescara, playing three years under head coach Giovanni Galeone, being featured as a wing forward in an attacking 4–3–3 lineup that won promotion to Serie A in 1992. He made his Serie A debut in the 1992–93 season, in what would remain his lone top flight season as a player.

After Pescara, he joined another Serie B club, Fidelis Andria, with little success; following that, he played with several other teams at Serie B, Serie C1 and Serie C2 level before retiring in 2003.

== Managerial career ==
Following his retirement as a player, Massara became a coach, working as an assistant for Benevento (2006–07), Pescara (2007) and Martina (2007–08).

In July 2008 he joined Palermo director of football Walter Sabatini as one of his collaborators for the Sicilians. He then followed Sabatini on the same role at Roma.

In May 2011, he became a formally licensed director of football after passing the specific Italian Football Federation classes.

He was successively named as director of football of Roma in October 2016, taking over from Sabatini himself; he however left the role soon later to re-join with Sabatini in his new role at Inter Milan and Jiangsu Suning.

On 1 June 2018, Massara returned to Roma as the club's general secretary, working alongside new director of football Monchi, and then replacing him after the latter's dismissal on 8 March 2019. On 5 June, Massara and Roma mutually parted ways.

On 21 June 2019, he was named new sporting director of Milan. On 17 November 2022, he was recognised as Sporting Director of the Year alongside fellow Milan director Paolo Maldini at the 2022 Globe Soccer Awards. Since summer 2024, he is a sporting director in Ligue 1 club, Stade Rennais but was dismissed after one season following a succession of failed signings in the transfer window. He replaced Florent Ghisolfi at Roma on June 18, 2025.

From 7 July 2026 he is the new Chief Football Officer at Juventus FC.
