= Milan TV =

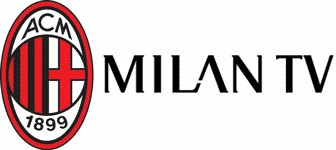
- Country: Italy

Programming
- Language(s): Italian
- Picture format: HDTV 1080i

History
- Launched: 16 December 1999
- Former names: Milan Channel (1999–2016)

Milan TV is a subscription-based television channel operated by Italian football club AC Milan. It first broadcast on 16 December 1999 as Milan Channel, with the current name being adopted on 1 July 2016.

The channel offers AC Milan fans exclusive interviews with players and staff, full matches, including replays of all Serie A, Coppa Italia, and Champions League/Europa League games, in addition to vintage matches, footballing news, and other themed programming.

In 2001, Riccardo Silva became CEO of Milan Channel, guiding the international development of the channel, also through the global broadcasting on YouTube.

As of 2022, programming has been reoccurring regularly on the YES Network.

== Staff ==
- Fabio Guadagnini
- Benedetta Radaelli
- Alessandro Bianchi
- Giuseppe Pastore
- Tommaso Turci
- Federica Zille
- Mauro Suma

== Regular or semi-regular guests ==
- Giovanni Lodetti (former footballer)
- Carlo Pellegatti (football commentator)
- Franco Ordine (sports writer)
