= GestiFute =

Portuguese sports agency

- Industry: Sports agency
- Founded: 1996
- Founder: Jorge Mendes
- Headquarters: Porto, Portugal
- Key people: Jorge Mendes
- Website: www.gestifute.com

Gestão de Carreiras de Profissionais Desportivos, S.A., known as GestiFute, is a Portuguese company providing agent services for footballers. Unlike other football associations, Portugal allowed other parties to own part of the economic rights of the players, in order to receive part of the transfer fees.

The company was founded by Jorge Mendes in 1996.

== Players investment ==
GestiFute involved in numbers of high profile move in European transfer market, such as Cristiano Ronaldo. Before FIFA set up a new law restricting third party ownership (with "significant influence"), GestiFute was actively involved in third parties ownership. However, it in fact conflict of interests, as GestiFute was both the owner and the agent of the player. After 2008, GestiFute only received agent fees for the deals the company broke, and not actively in third parties ownership. However a portion of the million transfer deal (such as 5%) was already half of, or even exceeded, the annual salary of the player.

=== 2003–2006 ===
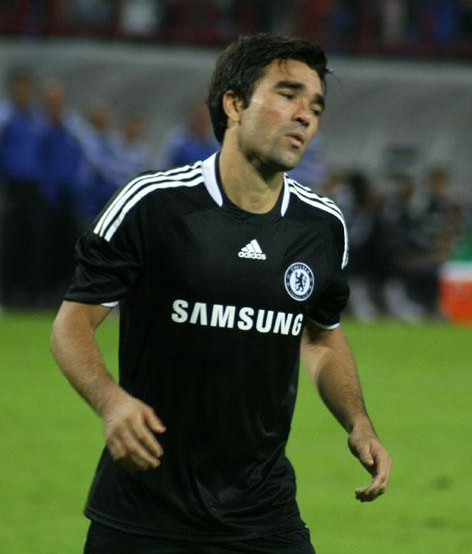
On 29 July 2003, Porto bought 20% of Deco's economic rights from GestiFute for €2.25 million.

On 9 March 2003, GestiFute announced that they represent Benfica's midfielder Tiago, who was previously represented by their rival company, Superfute. Approximately two months later, on 23 May, Tiago's teammate Ricardo Rocha traveled the same path, making a surprising move to GestiFute. During the summer of that year, on 29 July, Porto bought 20% of Deco's economic rights from GestiFute for €2.25 million, plus 5% of Paulo Ferreira and Ricardo Carvalho's economic rights, this price being higher than presumed because the Portuguese team refused a €15 million offer from Barcelona. On 4 April, the same team bought more 15% of Deco's economic rights for €1.25 million, plus 10% of striker Benni McCarthy's rights. After acquiring 35% rights, however, Porto still owned 85% rights before he was sold.

In 2004, some players represented by GestiFute were transferred for record prices, the first being Porto defender Paulo Ferreira, who joined Chelsea in a €20 million deal on 22 June. One month later, on 27 July, Ferreira's teammate Ricardo Carvalho also made a move to Chelsea, for a fee of €30 million. Deco was also later bought by Barcelona, but for less than Ferreira and Carvalho — Barcelona agreed on a €15 million fee in cash, in addition to the full rights of winger Ricardo Quaresma, who was valued at €6 million.

In 2005, on 14 June, GestiFute acquired a reported 70% of midfielder Anderson's economic rights for €5.5 million. Anderson, who was playing for Grêmio at the time, signed for the company after it was determined he would not feature for Grêmio again. Some days later, on 21 June, Porto bought Anderson, with GestiFute retaining a reported 20% of the Brazilian's rights with the club retaining 65% economic rights. Later that year, on 9 December, Tunisian midfielder Selim Benachour of Vitória de Guimarães also signed for GestiFute. On 1 December 2006, 18-year-old midfielder Fábio Coentrão joined GestiFute.

=== 2007–2010 ===
In 2007, GestiFute's Jorge Mendes was responsible for the transfers of Pepe, who joined Real Madrid from Porto for €30 million; Simão, who was transferred from Benfica to Atlético Madrid for €20 million; and Nani, who moved to Manchester United from Sporting CP after he dropped his previous agent, Ana Almeida. Also in that year, Anderson also moved to Manchester United in a €30 million deal, with previous club Porto paying Mendes a reported €3 million for his share of Anderson's registration.

In August 2010, football agent Gonçalo Reis complained that he had been left on the sidelines when Bébé, a player he represented, was transferred to Manchester United from Vitória de Guimarães. "When [Jorge] Mendes arrived," he said, "I was out of the transaction." Reis had arranged Bébé's move to Vitória from Estrela da Amadora in the Portuguese third division in July 2010 after the cancellation of his contract due to the club's inability to pay the player's wages. Manchester United signed Bébé for a reported fee of £7.4 million five weeks later. Then-United manager Sir Alex Ferguson admitted that he had not seen Bébé play. Gestifute apparently received 30% of the transfer fee for their part ownership of the player's economic rights. Vitória's directors reported that Mendes had received €3.6 million of the €9 million fee from the deal, with reports in Portugal suggesting that €2.7 million of that sum came from the 30% of the player's economic rights initially retained by Bébé but bought from the player by Mendes for €100,000.

In the summer of 2008, GestiFute also signed 15% economic rights of Pelé, as the latter was the piece-weigh of Internazionale to sign Ricardo Quaresma. Quaresma himself joined Inter for €18.6 million plus Pelé, was also represented by GestiFute. In June 2009, GestiFute signed Alexis Quintulen's 35% rights and Ignacio Ameli's 50% rights for €473,000.

In the same season Bébé left Portugal, GestiFute also broke the deal of Ángel Di María to Real Madrid for €25 million plus a €11 million bonus. Two year before, GestiFute purchased 33% of the player's economic rights from Benfica for €800 million, which Benfica the remain 70% earlier in August for €1 billion. GestiFute also signed the rights to receive 30% profit of selling Sidnei after deducted the residual contract value (Portuguese: mais valia líquida).

=== 2011– ===
In August 2011, Porto sold striker Radamel Falcao for €40 million to Atlético Madrid. GestiFute and Orel B.V. received a total of €3.705 million agent fee (unknown ratio between the two company). GestiFute later (or before the deal) became the agent of the player. That season, GestiFute also represented Benfica's Fábio Coentrão in his €30 million deal to Real Madrid.

== Clients ==
=== Current ===
GestiFute provide agency services for the following players:

- (Brazil) Alan
- (Albania) Albion Avdijaj
- (Brazil) Alípio
- (Brazil) Anderson
- (Netherlands) Djavan Anderson
- (Portugal) André Geraldes
- (Portugal) André Gomes
- (Portugal) André Moreira
- (Portugal) André Silva
- (Spain) Ansu Fati
- (Portugal) Bebé
- (Portugal) Bernardo Silva
- (Portugal) José Bosingwa
- (Portugal) Bruno Alves
- (Portugal) Bruno Gama
- (Spain) Burgui
- (Portugal) Cândido Costa
- (Portugal) Cícero
- (Portugal) Cristiano Ronaldo
- (Portugal) Custódio
- (Portugal) Daniel Podence
- (Portugal) Danny
- (Spain) David de Gea
- (Argentina) Ángel Di María
- (Spain) Diego Costa
- (Portugal) Dinis Almeida
- (Portugal) Diogo Gonçalves
- (Portugal) Diogo Salomão
- (Russia) Artem Dzyuba
- (Brazil) Ederson
- (Netherlands) Anwar El Ghazi
- (Portugal) Fábio Coentrão
- (Brazil) Fabinho
- (Portugal) Fábio Cardoso
- (Colombia) Radamel Falcao
- (Argentina) Facundo Ferreyra
- (Algeria) Faouzi Ghoulam
- (Brazil) Filipe Augusto
- (Brazil) Gabriel Paulista
- (Brazil) Gabrielzinho
- (Argentina) Ezequiel Garay
- (Portugal) Gil Dias
- (Portugal) Gonçalo Cardoso
- (Portugal) Gonçalo Guedes
- (Algeria) Okacha Hamzaoui
- (Egypt) Ahmed Hassan
- (Angola) Hélder Costa
- (Portugal) Henrique Hilário
- (Portugal) Hugo Almeida
- (Portugal) Hugo Viana
- (Portugal) Ivan Cavaleiro
- (Portugal) João Cancelo
- (Portugal) João Carvalho
- (Portugal) João Gamboa
- (Portugal) João Moutinho
- (Portugal) João Teixeira
- (Portugal) Jorge Ribeiro
- (Portugal) José Sá
- (Portugal) Júlio Alves
- (Switzerland) Pajtim Kasami
- (Austria) Johannes Kreidl
- (Spain) Lamine Yamal
- (Portugal) Manuel Fernandes
- (Spain) Marco Asensio
- (Portugal) Mário Sérgio
- (Portugal) Miguel Veloso
- (Brazil) Miranda
- (Portugal) Moreno
- (Portugal) Nani
- (Portugal) Nélson Oliveira
- (Portugal) Nélson Semedo
- (Argentina) Nicolás Otamendi
- (Portugal) Nuno Morais
- (Portugal) Paulo Ferreira
- (Portugal) Pedro Neto
- (Portugal) Pelé
- (Portugal) Pepe
- (Portugal) Pizzi
- (Portugal) Ricardo Quaresma
- (Mexico) Rafael Márquez
- (Portugal) Raul Meireles
- (Portugal) Renato Sanches
- (Portugal) Ricardo Alberto Silveira de Carvalho
- (Portugal) Ricardo Jorge Gomes Carvalho
- (Portugal) Ricardo Pereira
- (Portugal) Roderick Miranda
- (Portugal) Rodrigo Fernandes
- (Peru) Alberto Rodríguez
- (Colombia) James Rodríguez
- (Portugal) Rúben Dias
- (Portugal) Rúben Micael
- (Portugal) Rúben Neves
- (Portugal) Rúben Vezo
- (Portugal) Rui Patrício
- (Brazil) Sidnei
- (Portugal) Simão
- (Brazil) Thiago Silva
- (Portugal) Tiago
- (Portugal) Tiago Pinto
- (Portugal) Tiago Sá
- (Portugal) Ukra
- (Netherlands) Mitchell van Rooijen
- (Brazil) Vinicius Alves
- (Portugal) Vitinha
- (Portugal) Vítor Gomes
- (Montenegro) Nikola Vukčević
- (Brazil) Wallace
- (Portugal) Walter Patrick
- (Switzerland) Andi Zeqiri

Coach

- (Portugal) Abel Ferreira
- (Portugal) Bruno Lage
- (Portugal) Capucho
- (Portugal) Costinha
- (Portugal) José Mourinho
- (Portugal) Nuno Espírito Santo
- (Portugal) Paulo Fonseca
- (Portugal) Rui Faria

=== Former ===
Name	Nationality	Occupation	Top transfer under Gestifute (only fees at least €1 million)				Source
Name	Nationality	Occupation	From	To	Fee (million €)	Year	Source
Abel Xavier	Portugal	Footballer (retired)	-	-	-	-	
Bruno Fernandes	Portugal	Footballer (retired)	-	-	-	-	
Capucho	Portugal	Footballer (retired)	(Portugal) Porto	(Scotland) Rangers	1.5	2003	
César Peixoto	Portugal	Footballer (retired)	(Portugal) Belenenses	(Portugal) Porto	1	2002	
Daniel Carriço	Portugal	Footballer (retired)	-	-	-	-	
Deco	Portugal	Footballer (retired)	(Portugal) Porto	(Spain) Barcelona	15	2004	
Derlei	Portugal	Footballer (retired)	(Portugal) Porto	(Russia) Dynamo Moscow	7	2005	
Diogo Jota	Portugal	Footballer (deceased)	(England) Wolverhampton	(England) Liverpool	45	2020	
Duda	Portugal	Footballer	-	-	-	-	
Fábio Faria	Portugal	Footballer (retired)	(Portugal) Rio Ave	(Portugal) Benfica	2	2009	
Henrique Hilário	Portugal	Footballer	-	-	-	-	
Hugo Leal	Portugal	Footballer (retired)	(Portugal) Benfica	(Spain) Atlético Madrid	3.75	1999	
Hugo Porfírio	Portugal	Footballer (retired)	-	-	-	-	
Ivo Damas	Portugal	Footballer (retired)	-	-	-	-	
João Alves	Portugal	Footballer (retired)	(Portugal) Braga	(Portugal) Sporting CP	2.5	2005	
Jorge Andrade	Portugal	Footballer (retired)	(Portugal) Porto	(Spain) Deportivo La Coruña	12	2002	
José Sousa	Portugal	Footballer (retired)	-	-	-	-	
Marcos	Brazil	Footballer	-	-	-	-	
Mário Sérgio	Portugal	Footballer	-	-	-	-	
Maniche	Portugal	Footballer (retired)	(Portugal) Porto	(Russia) Dynamo Moscow	16	2005	
Nandinho	Portugal	Footballer (retired)	-	-	-	-	
Nuno	Portugal	Footballer (retired)	-	-	-	-	
Paíto	Mozambique	Footballer	-	-	-	-	
Ricardo Rocha	Portugal	Footballer	(Portugal) Benfica	(England) Tottenham Hotspur	5	2007	
