= Walter Patrick =

Portuguese footballer

Personal information
- Full name: Walter Patrick Bexigas Ramos Lopes
- Date of birth: 10 August 1992 (age 34)
- Place of birth: Lisbon, Portugal
- Height: 1.81 m (5 ft 11 in)
- Position: Winger

Youth career
- 2006–2008: Valenciennes
- 2008–2010: Sheffield United
- 2010–2011: Valenciennes

Senior career*
Years	Team	Apps	(Gls)
2011–2012	Paris Saint-Germain C		
2013	Lyn B	6	(1)
2014	Naval	12	(2)
2014–2015	Oliveirense	2	(0)
2015	Naval	4	(1)
2015–2016	Moura	21	(2)
2016–2017	THOI Lakatamia	?	(?)
2017	Hradec Králové	0	(0)
- * Club domestic league appearances and goals as of 2 December 2017

Walter Patrick Bexigas Ramos Lopes (born 10 August 1992) is a Portuguese professional footballer who played as a forward, most recently for FC Hradec Králové.

== Career ==
On 10 May 2015, Walter Patrick made his professional debut with Oliveirense in a 2014–15 Segunda Liga match against Farense.
