= Giovanni Branchini =

Italian football agent

Giovanni Branchini is an Italian football agent.

== Career ==
Branchini has represented Brazil international Ronaldo.
