= Juni Calafat =

Spanish association football scout

José Antonio Calafat de Souza (born 19 December 1972) is a football scout who is the chief scout of Real Madrid.

== Career ==
In 2013, Calafat started working for Spanish La Liga side Real Madrid.
