= Federico Pastorello =

Italian football agent

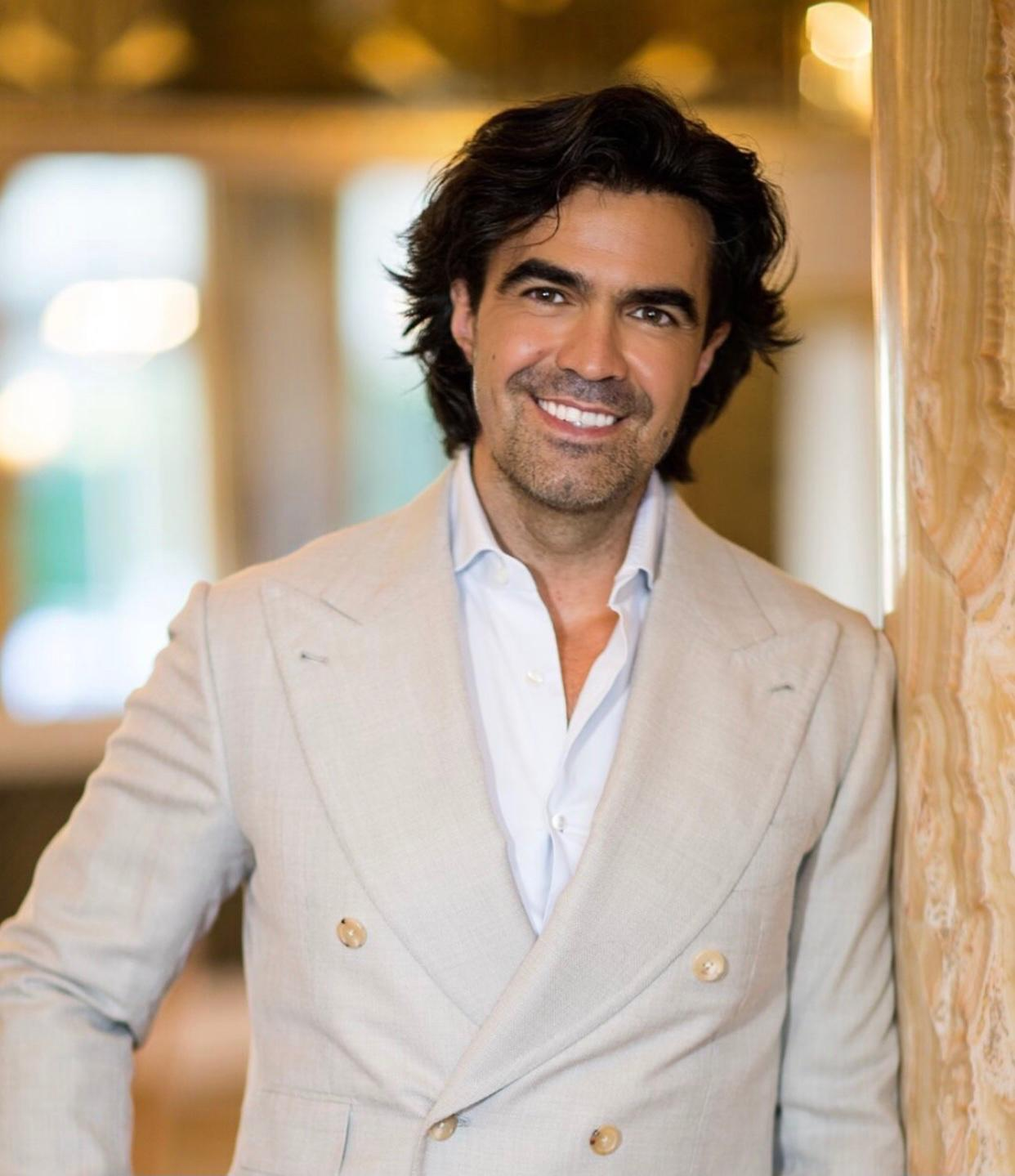
- Pastorello in 2021
- Born: Federico Pastorello; July 9, 1973 (age 52); Rovereto, Italy
- Occupation: Sports agent

Federico Pastorello (born 9 July 1973 in Rovereto, Italy) is an Italian football agent. In 2021, he was named the best agent in the world, according to Globe Soccer Awards.

== Career ==
He has represented Belgium professional football player Romelu Lukaku, the Iranian striker Mehdi Taremi, and other players like Francesco Acerbi and Stefan de Vrij.
