= Vadim Vasilyev (businessman) =

Sporting director of AS Monaco FC

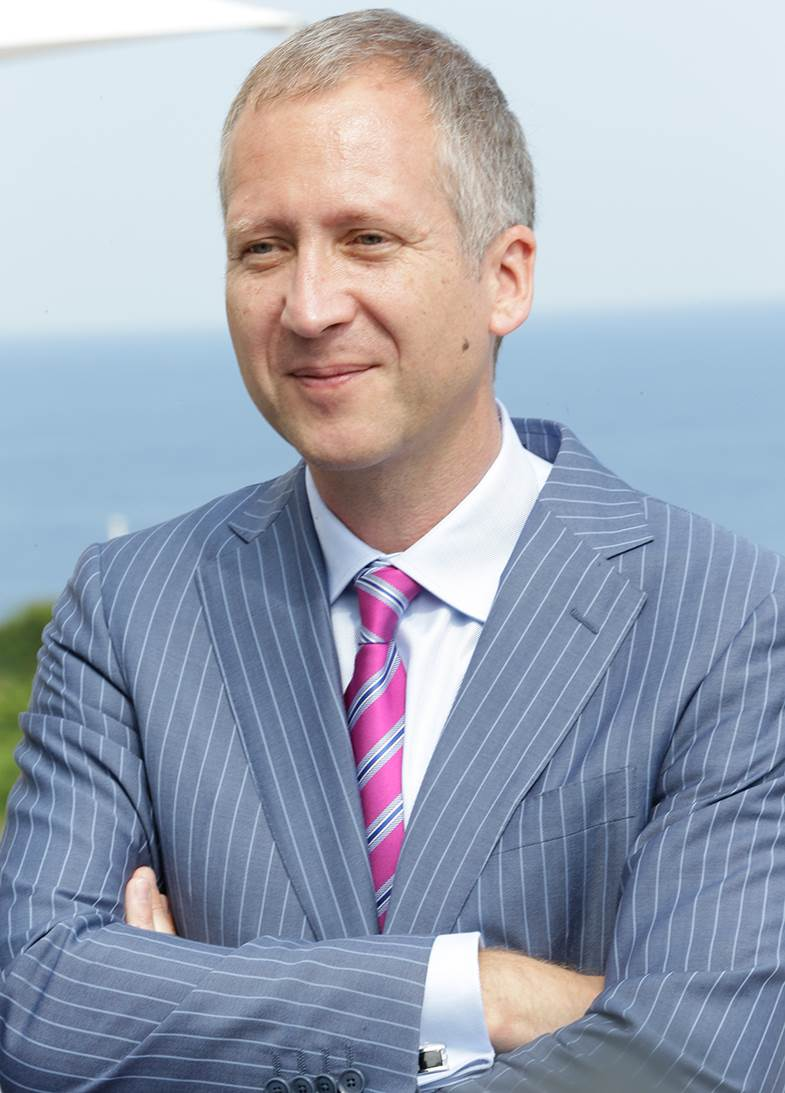

Vadim Vasilyev (born 23 September 1965) is the former Vice President of the Monégasque football club AS Monaco FC. He was appointed to that position on 8 August 2013 and has since played a key role in developing AS Monaco's team and securing its position, including negotiating key agreements with Ligue 1 and with UEFA around its Financial Fair Play Regulations. He has also gained a reputation as an effective operator in the transfer market, beginning with a number of high-profile signings completed during the 2013 summer transfer window. He was sacked soon after the return of manager Leonardo Jardim on 14 February 2019 due to Monaco's poor form.

== Education and career ==
Vasilyev graduated with a degree in economics from the Moscow State Institute of International Relations in 1987. He worked for the Soviet Union's Ministry of Foreign Affairs from 1987 to 1990, during which he was posted to the Soviet Embassy in Iceland.

Following his diplomatic career, Vasilyev worked for a number of private companies, including Uralkali, a producer of potash, where he was Director of Exports. Later on, he established his own company and worked as an entrepreneur developing businesses.

=== Football management career ===
In January 2013, he started working as an advisor to the president of AS Monaco FC, Dmitry Rybolovlev, helping the club to complete a number of transfer deals during the winter window of the 2012–13 season. He subsequently became the sporting director on 25 March 2013. He became vice president during the summer 2013.

As of 15 October 2013, Vasilyev, in addition to his role as vice president, assumed the role of director general for Monaco.

After achieving its goal of promotion, Vasilyev focused on managing the club's summer transfer window. During this transfer window, Vasilyev targeted the recruitment of players – both French and foreign – that he and the club believed would help them achieve their objective of becoming a major force in Ligue 1. The new recruits in that period included Eric Abidal, Jérémy Toulalan, Ricardo Carvalho, Nicolas Isimat-Mirin, Radamel Falcao, João Moutinho and James Rodríguez.

Together with the president of the club, Vasilyev set a primary goal of qualifying for the UEFA Champions League and playing in the competition during the 2014–15 season.

Vasilyev also played a critical role in the resolution of the protracted conflict between AS Monaco and the Ligue de Football Professionnel (LFP) over the fiscal status of the Principality of Monaco. The dispute was finally resolved in July 2015. During the dispute, Vasilyev consistently promoted a message of unity across French football, suggesting that the game in France overall can benefit greatly from the development of Monaco and the influx of new and exciting talent to the League. He said at the time, "Most important is that French Football will benefit a lot from AS Monaco FC. We are adversaries only on the pitch, after we need to work together to improve the level of the league. That’s our goal."

The 2015 summer transfer window was an extraordinary time for Monaco in terms of the number of transfers agreed and the profit made from them. Transfers in and out include Monaco, to 31 August 2015, include:

Departures	Arrivals
Anthony Martial (Manchester United) – €80M	Ivan Cavaleiro (Benfica) – €15M
Geoffrey Kondogbia (Inter Milan) – €42M	Adama Traoré (Lille) – €14M
Aymen Abdennour (Valencia) – €30M	Rony Lopes (Manchester City) – €10M
Layvin Kurzawa (PSG) – €24M	Guido Carrillo (Estudiantes) – €9M
Yannick Carrasco (Atlético Madrid) – €20M	Boschilia (São Paulo) – €9M
Radamel Falcao (Chelsea, loan) – €10M	Allan Saint-Maximin (Saint-Étienne) – €5M
Lucas Ocampos (Marseille) – €7M	Thomas Lemar (Caen) – €4M
Nicolas Isimat-Mirin (PSV) – €3M	Corentin Jean (Troyes) – €4M
	Farès Bahlouli (Lyon) – €3M
Total departures: €216,000,000	Total arrivals: €73,000,000

"Whether it is Luis Campos, Nicolas Holveсk or Vadim Vasilyev – the vice-president of the club [Monaco] and negotiator number one when it comes to talking about money. He is very smart and educated, he always demonstrates perfect behavior and great knowledge," said Jean-Michel Vandamme, the director of Ligue 1 club Lille who negotiated the deal of Adama Traoré to Monaco.

In an interview with FranceFootball.fr, Vasilyev spoke about the sports policy of Monaco, numerous transfers of players during the summer transfer window and the ambitions of club owner Dmitry Rybolovlev.

At the beginning of 2016, Monaco appointed Claude Makélélé as technical director to assist Vasilyev as well as work with manager Leonardo Jardim and his first-team squad. Upon being appointed, Makélélé said, "My meeting with Vadim Vasilyev was decisive in my decision to join AS Monaco and this project is based on the long term."

In January 2016, Monaco signed Brazilian defender Jemerson from Atlético Mineiro. The 23-year-old signed a five-year contract after the two clubs agreed a fee reported to be in the region of €10 million (£7.6 million). After the agreement was reached, Vasilyev said, "We are very proud to welcome Jemerson, a young Brazilian defender whom we have been tracking regularly. We have a lot of faith in him. He will have the opportunity to develop at AS Monaco, and we are sure he will soon be showing all of his qualities".

In February 2016, at the Globe Soccer Awards for the 2015–16 season, the best deal award made during the two FIFA football transfer windows was presented in Monte Carlo to Vasilyev.

Vasilyev commented on the award: "I am very happy, this prize rewards all the work done for the past three years. We always tried to have better financial performances with good sporting results. I am proud of our Champions League campaign last year, and also of this Ligue 1 season. I hope we will come back in Champions League next season while maintaining the economic stability of the club".

=== Sacking ===
Vasilyev was sacked by Monaco on 14 February 2019 as a result of their poor form in the 2018-19 Season. Club President Dmitry Rybolovlev justified his removal in a public statement, stating that "It's time for change," he said. "And these changes affect not only the workforce, but also the leaders. So I made a decision that is very hard for me – that of releasing Vadim as vice-president and general manager of the club."
