= Jorge Mendes =

Portuguese football agent (born 1966)

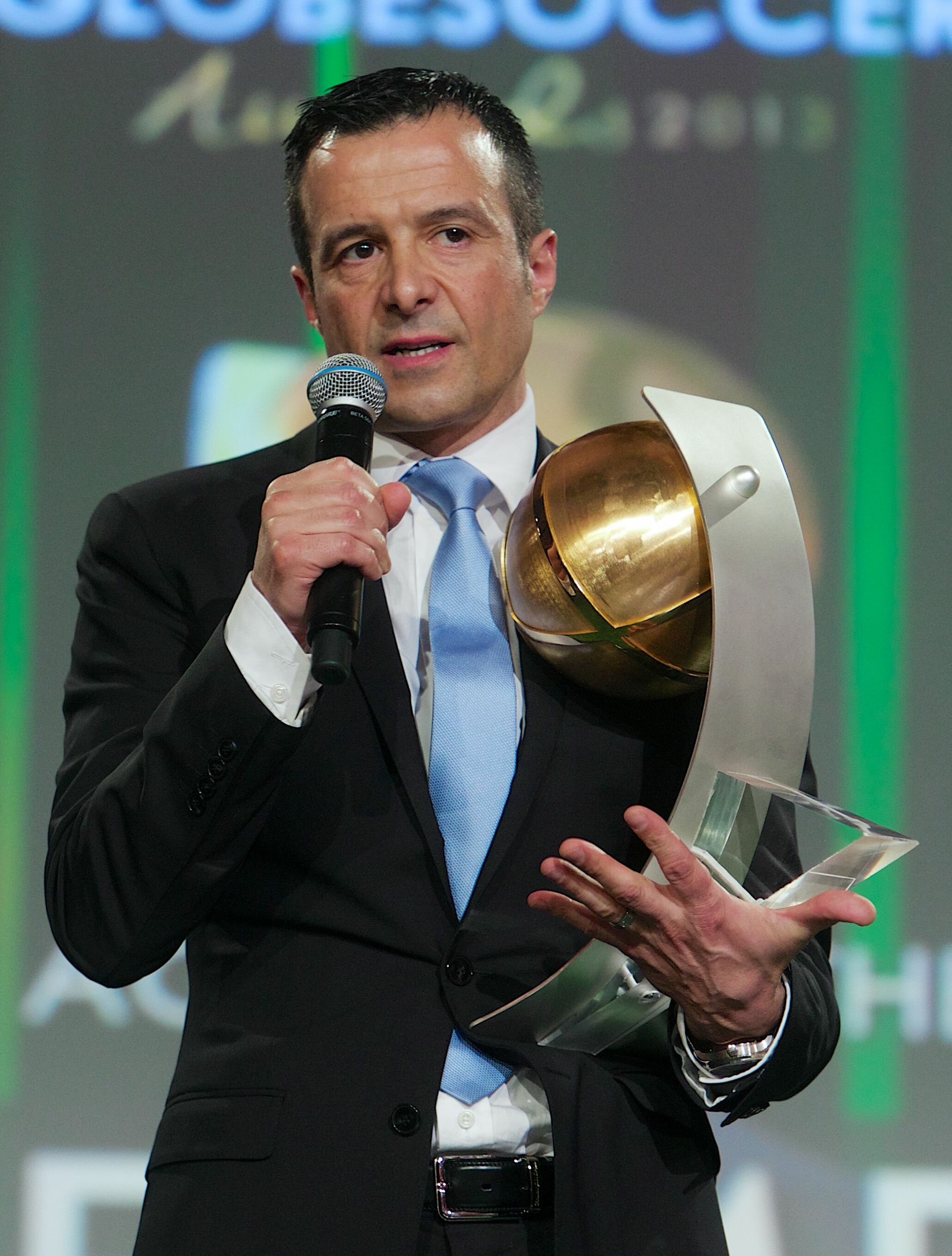
- Mendes in 2013
- Born: Jorge Paulo Agostinho Mendes; 7 January 1966 (age 60); Lisbon, Portugal
- Occupation: Sports agent
- Years active: 1996–present
- Employer: GestiFute

Jorge Paulo Agostinho Mendes (born 7 January 1966) is a Portuguese football agent who heads GestiFute, which he founded in 1996. He is often referred to as a "super-agent".

Mendes is among the most influential football agents in the world, with clients including Cristiano Ronaldo, David de Gea, José Mourinho, Rúben Dias, James Rodríguez, Ángel Di María and Lamine Yamal.

Outside of football, he represents clients such as triple jump champion Patricia Mamona, surfer Frederico Morais, tennis player João Sousa and the cyclist João Almeida.

== Career as an agent ==
=== First deals ===
Mendes' first deal as a football agent came in 1996 when he brokered Nuno Espírito Santo's move from Vitória de Guimarães to Deportivo de La Coruña. He had met the goalkeeper in a bar in Guimarães. After that deal, Mendes gradually attracted more Portuguese players, including Jorge Andrade. Hugo Viana's move from Sporting CP to Newcastle United in the Premier League for around €12 million in 2002 was his first major international transfer. Part of Mendes' success was ostensibly based on his frequent presence at football schools and youth teams throughout Portugal, spotting and signing young players, as he did with Cristiano Ronaldo and Ricardo Quaresma.

It has been reported that Mendes came to physical blows at the Portela Airport in Lisbon with Luís Figo's agent, José Veiga, whose influence he was gradually supplanting at this time. Mendes has also been accused by other agents of moving in on their players shortly before agreeing major deals.

=== Mourinho and Chelsea ===
In 2004, Mendes brokered José Mourinho's move from Porto to manage Chelsea, despite Mourinho already having an agent, José Baidek, whom Mourinho had known since his time at União de Leiria and who had reportedly lined up a move to Liverpool. Mourinho and Mendes negotiated with the agent Pini Zahavi, who acted as Chelsea's representative.

The deal established Mendes' importance. He built up a roster of the leading Portuguese players and every Portuguese player that followed Mourinho to Chelsea was a client of Mendes, including Ricardo Carvalho, Paulo Ferreira, Tiago and Maniche. Mendes was paid by Chelsea to act for the player and for the club.

GestiFute was also involved in part-owning the economic rights of a number of these players. In July 2003, Porto bought 20% of Brazilian-born Portuguese professional footballer Deco's rights from GestiFute in exchange for €2.25 million, plus 5% of the economic rights for Ricardo Carvalho and Paulo Ferreira. Shortly afterwards, GestiFute sold a further 15% of Deco's economic rights to the club, this time in return for €1.25 million and 10% of striker Benni McCarthy's rights.

=== After Chelsea ===
After Mourinho's departure from Chelsea in September 2007, Mendes oversaw his move to Inter Milan in 2008 for a fee that made him the highest paid coach in the world, and then, in May 2010, that which saw him move from Inter to become Real Madrid's manager on a four-year contract worth £40 million.

In 2008, Mendes also handled the deal that took the manager Luiz Felipe Scolari to Chelsea, negotiating a three-year contract worth between £5.5 million and £6.25 million. At that summer's UEFA Euro 2008 tournament, Mendes had been allowed privileged access to the Portugal national team's hotel by Scolari, who was then managing the national side.

==== Cristiano Ronaldo, Nani, and Anderson ====
Mendes oversaw the transfer of Cristiano Ronaldo from Sporting CP to Manchester United for £12.24 million in 2003 and in 2007 those of Anderson and Nani to the same club for £46 million. The Nani transfer reportedly followed only once the player had dropped his existing agent, Ana Almeida. That summer, Mendes was also responsible for the transfers of Pepe to Real Madrid for £25 million and Simão to Atlético Madrid for £16.5 million.

Mendes' association with Anderson reflected the connections he established in South America, in which he worked closely with Pini Zahavi. Part of the deal that took Anderson to Manchester United saw his previous club Porto pay Mendes a reported £4 million for his share of Anderson's registration. Mendes was said to have contributed 20% of the £3.75 million Porto paid Grêmio in Brazil to sign the midfielder in 2006.

In 2009, Mendes was reported to have made £4 million from Cristiano Ronaldo's £80 million transfer from Manchester United to Real Madrid.

==== Bebé transfer ====
In August 2010, football agent Gonçalo Reis complained that he had been left on the sidelines when Bebé, a player he represented, was transferred to Manchester United from Vitória de Guimarães. "When Mendes arrived," Reis said, "I was out of the transaction." In July 2010, Reis arranged Bebé's move to Vitória as a free agent from Estrela da Amadora in the semi-professional Portuguese third division after the cancellation of the player's contract due to the club's inability to pay his wages. Manchester United signed Bebé for a reported fee of £7.4 million five weeks later, when he had played just six pre-season friendlies for Vitória. Reis received notification that he had been sacked by Bebé in a letter dated 5 August that arrived two days before the completion of the Manchester United transfer on 11 August. Reis officially took his complaints to FIFA in May 2012.

At Vitória's subsequent general meeting, the club's directors revealed that Mendes had received €3.6 million of the €9 million fee from the Bebé transfer, with reports in Portugal suggesting that €2.7 million of that sum came from the 30% of the player's economic rights initially retained by Bebé when he moved to Vitória but bought from the player by Mendes for €100,000. Emilio Macedo, club president of Vitória de Guimarães club, called Mendes "the bulwark of this transfer" and defended the agent, saying, "With all due respect to other agents, this country owes him a lot because he handles large transfers and brings money into the country because this is like an export." The transfer was subsequently investigated by the Portuguese police.

Manchester United's then manager, Sir Alex Ferguson, admitted that he had not seen Bebé play before signing the player. He had reportedly been recommended to the club by Carlos Queiroz, who had two spells as assistant manager at Manchester United and who at that time was coach of the Portugal national team. Queiroz's relationship with United had been important in the transfers of Anderson and Nani in 2007; he is also represented by Mendes.

=== 2014 summer transfer window ===
Mendes brokered four of the seven biggest deals worldwide during the 2014 summer transfer window from which he earned an estimated £30 million. James Rodríguez moved to Real Madrid from Monaco for £63 million, Ángel Di María from Real Madrid to Manchester United for £60 million, Diego Costa from Atlético Madrid to Chelsea for £32 million and Eliaquim Mangala from Porto to Manchester City for £32 million.

=== Third-party ownership accusations ===
On 22 September 2014, an investigation by The Guardian implicated Jorge Mendes alongside ex-Manchester United and Chelsea chief executive Peter Kenyon in breaching FIFA regulations regarding third-party ownership and conflict of interest in player representation, buying player rights through companies based in Jersey and Ireland. This followed another report published in January 2014 suggesting Kenyon's ex-club Chelsea have invested in third-party ownership via Mendes and Kenyon, a practice banned by the Premier League. Chelsea declined to comment on the accusations. On 23 September 2014, UEFA announced their intention to crack down on the practice of third-party ownership.

=== Wolverhampton Wanderers ===
After the takeover of English Championship club Wolverhampton Wanderers by Fosun International, Mendes was implemented as an agent for the club. Along with the help of team general manager Andrea Butti and sporting director Kevin Thelwell, 12 players were signed within six weeks during the 2016 summer transfer window.

=== Tax avoidance ===
In December 2016, leaked documents suggested that Mendes was involved in a massive tax avoidance scheme with both Mourinho and Ronaldo accused of not paying taxes by using offshore accounts.

=== Swansea City ===
Mendes began working with Premier League club Swansea City during the January 2018 transfer window, assisting the club in identifying players for newly-appointed manager Carlos Carvalhal. Previously, he brought Portugal under-21 midfielder Renato Sanches to the club, on loan from Bayern Munich, in August 2017.

=== Cycling ===
In January 2021, Mendes got into the world of cycling with his sports marketing company Polaris Sports partnering with Corso Sports, which sees Portuguese riders Joao Almeida and Ruben Guerreiro promoted by the team.

== GestiFute and CAA ==
In 2008, GestiFute announced that it had entered into partnership with Creative Artists Agency (CAA) in the United States to "create global opportunities for current and future clients", following CAA's expansion into the sports market.
