= MP & Silva =

MP & Silva Limited
- Industry: Media rights management
- Founded: 2004
- Founders: Riccardo Silva; Andrea Radrizzani
- Defunct: 17 October 2018
- Fate: Liquidation
- Headquarters: London, England
- Area served: Worldwide
- Owner: Everbright Securities and Beijing Baofeng Technology (65%)
- Website: mpsilva.com

MP & Silva Limited was an international sports marketing and media rights firm based in London. Founded in 2004 by Italian businessmen Riccardo Silva and Andrea Radrizzani, the company was primarily involved in the acquisition and international resale of media rights for sporting events.

At its peak, in 2016, the company was valued around US$1 billion. At this time Riccardo Silva, and his partners including Andrea Radrizzani, sold the company and a majority stake was acquired by two Chinese firms.

In October 2018, the company was ordered into administration over a multitude of missed rights payments.

== History ==
MP & Silva began in 2004 with the acquisition of the global rights distribution of selected Italian Serie A football teams. In 2006, the company acquired the rights for the majority of Serie A teams. The first headquarters office opened in Singapore in 2007. By 2009, the company's portfolio principally consisted of media rights of European football leagues being distributed to Asian TV broadcasters. In 2010, MP & Silva headquarters moved to London where they started working with Arsenal. The company acquired the pan-European rights for the French Open in 2011.

In 2013, MP & Silva secured the Premier League's broadcast rights in 51 territories, including the Middle East. The agency also bought Formula One rights in MENA and some selected European countries.

They aired CPBL games throughout 2014 before stopping in July 2014.

At the beginning of 2015, the company announced its expansion in the United States market and its acquisition of European rights to the National Football League.

In May 2016, Chinese companies Everbright Securities and Beijing Baofeng Technology bought a majority 65% stake of MP & Silva. The purchase was made through a strategic partnership, the Shanghai Jin Xin investment fund.

The company began to face significant struggles under the Chinese majority ownership. In July 2018, it was reported that the company had missed rights payments to entities such as the Premier League (where it held rights in the Asia-Pacific region) and Scottish Professional Football League. Both entities cut their ties with MP & Silva. On 27 July 2018, the Serie A sued MP & Silva over nearly €38 million in unpaid fees. Arsenal F.C. and the International Handball Federation also terminated its contracts with MP & Silva. The French Tennis Federation petitioned in the High Court of Justice for the winding up on MP & Silva under the Insolvency Act 1986.

On 17 October 2018, the High Court ordered the winding-up of MP & Silva.
