= Braviken Paper Mill =

Paper mill

Coordinates: 58°38′26″N 16°15′27″E

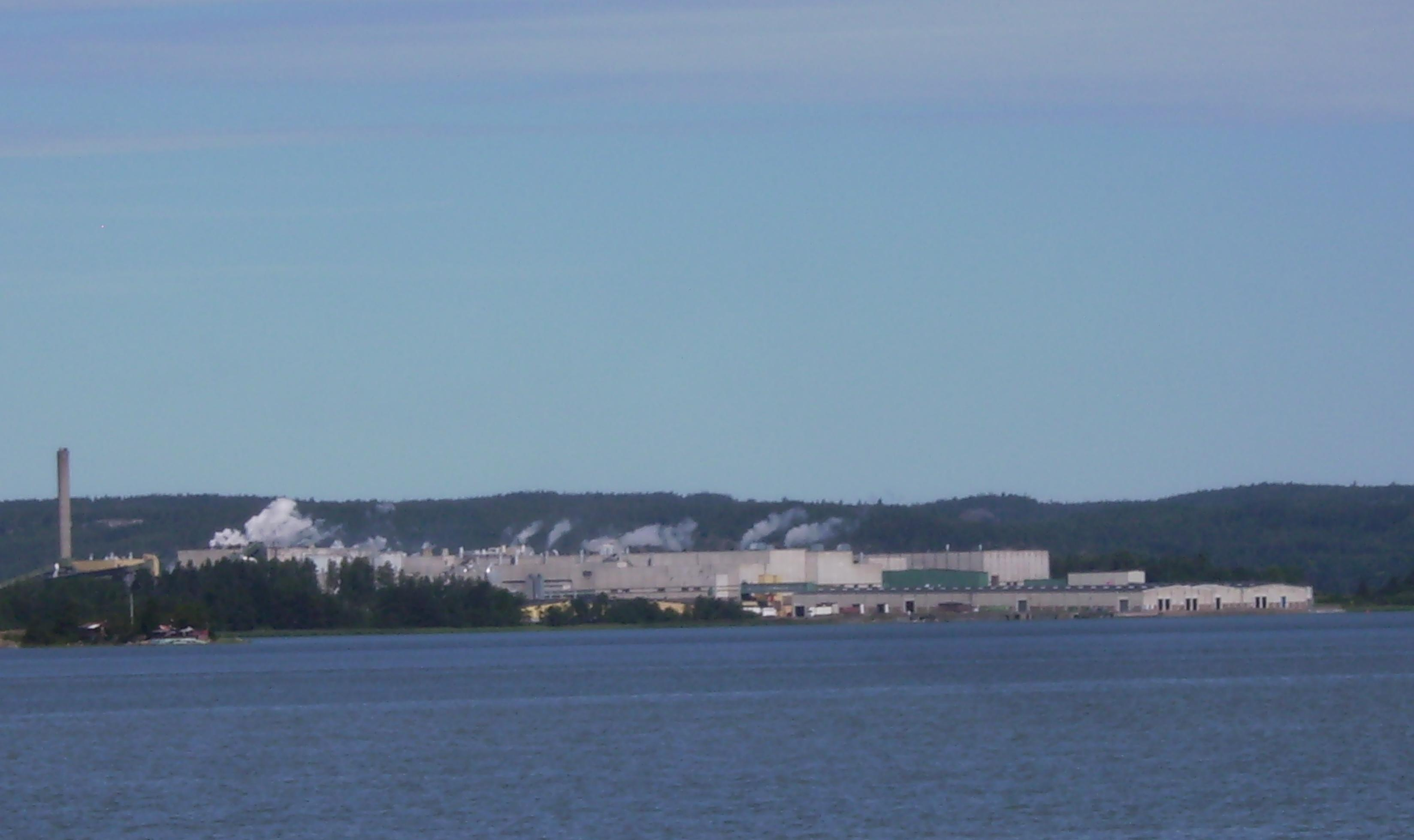
Braviken

Braviken Paper Mill (or simply Braviken) is a paper mill located outside Bråviken, Norrköping, in Sweden. It is owned by Holmen Board and Paper and part of Holmen Group.

Since the name is derived from the location, Bråviken, and since the name of the paper mill was to be internationally read and spoken, the ring diacritic above the a was dropped.

== Introduction ==
Braviken mainly produces magazine, book and newsprint paper, both white and colored.

Three paper machines are located at the mill:

- PM51, the oldest one, was built 1977 and production ended September 14, 2013. Produced mainly directory paper in different colors (white, yellow and pink). The width of the rolls leaving the paper machine was 8.50m. Produced 200.000 tons of paper per year.
- PM52, built in 1986. Produces newsprint and book paper. Colors of the paper produced are white and what is referred to as baby pink, which is, as the name suggests, a variant of pink produced for Sportbladet. The width of a roll is 8.55m. Produces 250.000 tons of paper per year.
- PM53, the latest, and obviously most modern of the machines produces magazine paper, at a rate of 300.000 tons per year.

Each machine goes in a distinctive color: PM51 is completely green, PM52 is blue, while the PM53 is blue with a touch of violet.

The name of the machines comes from the fact that the mill used to be the fifth when MoDo AB owned it. The company itself does not own fifty machines.

== Technology ==
The mill has its own TMP factory which produces the pulp needed for the production.

== History ==
The production began in central Norrköping during the 15th century. Since expansion was hindered by lack of area the production moved outside Norrköping to Bråviken. The construction began in 1977, and by 1986 the second machine was built. In 1986 the last machine in central Norrköping shut down, and all of the operations moved to the new location.
