= UFO Sweden =

- Teaser poster
- Directed by: Victor Danell
- Written by: Victor Danell; Jimmy Nivrén Olsson
- Produced by: Albin Pettersson; Olle Tholén
- Starring: Inez Dahl Torhaug; Jesper Barkselius; Eva Melande; Sara Shirpey; Oscar Töringe
- Cinematography: Hannes Krantz
- Edited by: Victor Danell; Fredrik Morheden
- Music by: Oskar Sollenberg; Gustaf Spetz
- Production company: Crazy Pictures
- Distributed by: SF Studios
- Release dates: 12 December 2022 (Norrköping); 25 December 2022 (Sweden)
- Running time: 116 minutes
- Country: Sweden
- Language: Swedish
- Budget: 39 million kr (€3.4 million)
- Box office: $69,618

UFO Sweden (known as Watch the Skies in the United States and United Kingdom) is a 2022 Swedish science fiction adventure film directed and written by Victor Danell. The film follows a teenager who believes her missing father was abducted by aliens joins forces with a UFO club of endearing misfits.

The film had its world premiere at Norrköping on 12 December 2022, and was released in Sweden on 25 December.

== Cast ==
- Inez Dahl Torhaug as Denise
- Jesper Barkselius as Lennart
- Eva Melande as Kicki
- Sara Shirpey as Tomi
- Oscar Töringe as Uno

== Production ==
=== Background ===
When members of the film collective Crazy Pictures around the 2018 premiere of The Unthinkable, saw Michael Cavanagh and Kerstin Übelacker's documentary Ghost Rockets, Victor Danell realized that he lived near the Archives for the Unexplained premises and contacted them and UFO-Sverige. It started an idea to make a science fiction film with the unknown as a theme. According to the filmmakers, the film is "an adventure film for adults" and is inspired by TV series such as Stranger Things, True Detective, The X-Files and films such as Interstellar. The working title was Project X.

=== Filming ===
UFO Sweden began filming in Norrköping in August 2021. Filming concluded in early 2022, with some additional scenes filmed during the summer.

== Release ==
UFO Sweden had its world premiere at Norrköping on 12 December 2022, and was released in Sweden on 25 December.

An English dub of the film was released in the United States on 9 May 2025 by XYZ Films under the title Watch the Skies. This version was dubbed by the original actors in a recording studio. Their lip movements in the film were synchronized using an artificial intelligence visual dubbing product from Flawless. This is the first full length feature film to be visually dubbed using this technology.

== Reception ==
On the review aggregator website Rotten Tomatoes, 83% of 23 critics' reviews are positive.
