= Kolmården Wildlife Park =

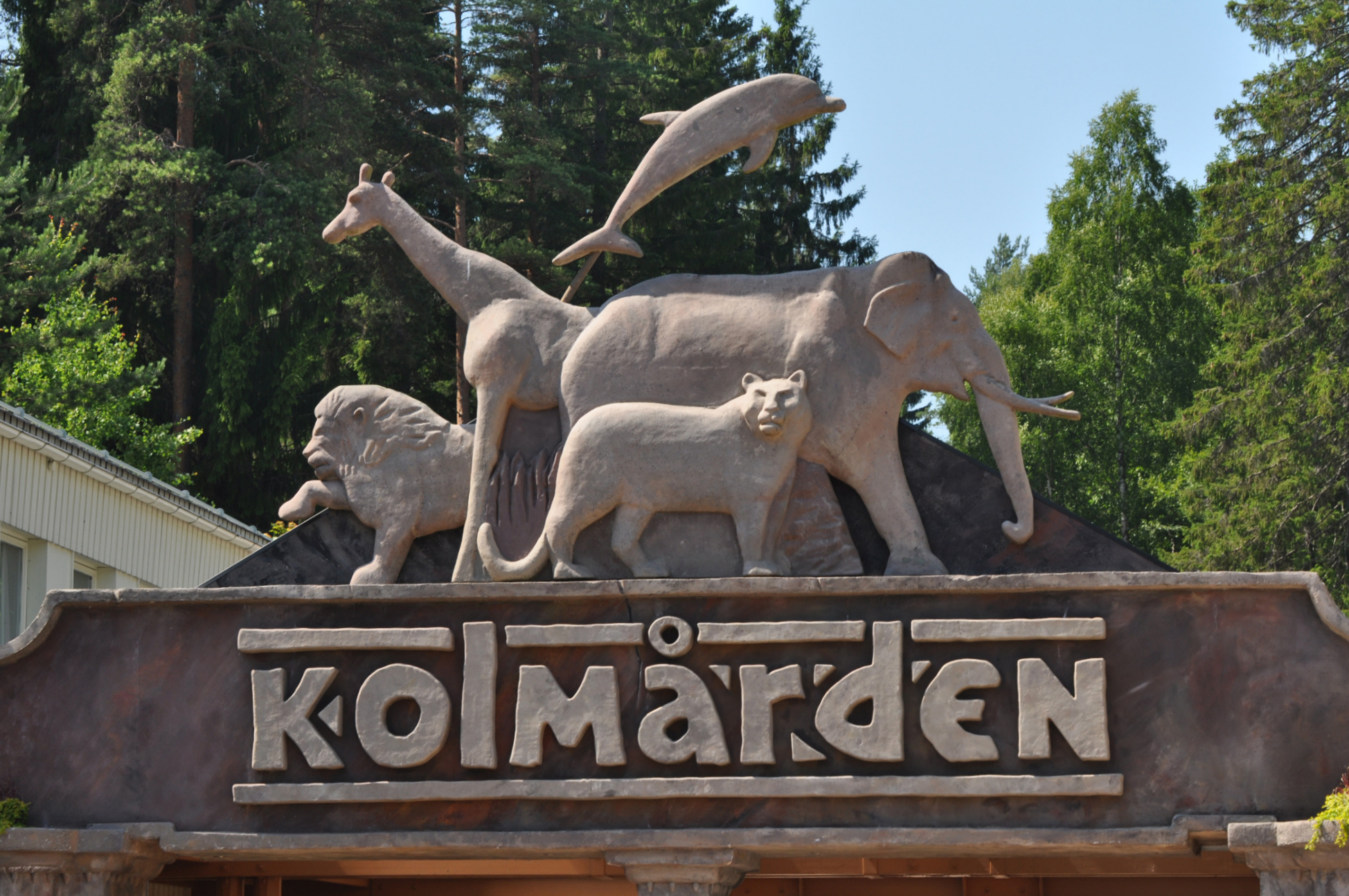
- Interactive map of Kolmården Wildlife Park
- 58°39′55″N 16°27′59″E
- Date opened: 27 May 1965
- Location: Bråviken bay, Norrköping, Sweden
- Land area: 1.5 km^{2} (370 acres)
- No. of species: 85
- Annual visitors: 720,000 (2015)
- Memberships: EAZA, WAZA
- Owner: Parks & Resorts Scandinavia AB
- Website: www.kolmarden.com

Kolmården Wildlife Park (Swedish: Kolmårdens djurpark) is a zoo that opened in 1965 overlooking Bråviken bay in Sweden. It is the largest zoo in Scandinavia, includes the first dolphinarium in Scandinavia, which opened in 1969 and has daily shows, and the world's first cable car safari. The wildlife park also has a birds of prey display and a seal show. In the Marine World area is a roller coaster called "The Dolphin Express". Another, larger, roller coaster in the park is Wildfire.

== History ==
The zoo was conceived in 1962 by Ulf Svensson as a means of reviving the Kolmården Municipality, and was opened in 1965 with 210 animals in residence.

The polar bear facility opened in 1968 with six polar bears—one of the largest polar facilities in the world. The dolphinarium opened in 1969, and in 1972 the zoo became home to brown bears. 1972 also saw the opening of the drive-through safari park, as well as the Tropicarium, which exhibited snakes and crocodiles, located outside the entry of the zoo.

In 1993, the zoo opened Dolphin Lagoon. In 1997, the zoo was turned over from municipal ownership to private ownership. Bamses värld, devoted to the cartoon character Bamse, was opened in the following year.

Parks and Resorts Scandinavia took over operation of the zoo in 2001 and has since been making many changes. Tiger World, where visitors can get "scary close" to tigers, was completed in 2007, and in 2008, the dolphinarium was extended into a new Marine World. In 2009, a family friendly roller-coaster called "The dolphin express" (Delfinexpressen) opened in Marine World.

In 2006, a baby gorilla was born at Kolmården for the first time in history, making its birth the first of its kind in Sweden. The gorilla, called Enzo, was not accepted by his mother during the first period of his life and the zookeepers had to nurse him. Enzo was later reintroduced to his family, and in 2009, Enzo got a brother, called Echo.

The safari park that originally opened in 1972 was closed to drive-through visitors in 2010, but was replaced by a low-going cableway in 2011, called "Safari". The attraction consists of five areas with different themes and animals:

- The highland: llamas and ibex
- Forest of the bears: Eurasian brown bears
- The Savannah: blackbuck, giraffes, common eland, gemsbok, wildebeest, ostriches, Ankole-Watusi, Grévy's zebras, lechwe, chital
- The Scandinavian forest: red deer, moose, fallow deer, European bison
- The Valley of Lions: African lions

On 17 June 2012, the park's grey wolves attacked and killed a zookeeper working alone in their enclosure.

In March 2014, Kolmården announced a new theme park area for younger children, the popular cartoon figure Bamse would get a whole new themed area with several attractions, including a smaller roller coaster due to open in 2015.

On 8 April 2014, the park announced their first major coaster investment, Wildfire, a Rocky Mountain Construction topper-track wooden coaster which opened in 2016.

== Animals ==
The zoo houses two Indian elephants given to the King of Sweden by Thailand. Kolmården Wildlife Park has the only gorillas, bottle-nosed dolphins, bush dogs, addax antelopes, oryx antelopes, Indian elephants, takin, Grévy's zebras and ibex in Sweden.

The park has 11 dolphins: Nephele (F), Ariel (F), Lyra (F), Luna (F), David (M), Fenah (F), Pärma (F), Peach (F), Finn (M), Alana (F) and Neptun (M).

== Incidents ==
In 1967, during the construction of the cable railway, a cable car started gliding and subsequently fell and crashed. There were two workers onboard, of which one died and the other sustained minor injuries.

During the years when public cars were allowed to drive through the Safari, visitors would occasionally step out from their vehicles in order to get better pictures. In July 1982 a man exited his car in the lion enclosure and was killed by the lions.

In 1991, elephant keeper Robert Nilsson was leading four elephants from their enclosure to their stable, when he was crushed to death. As Nilsson was walking in between the elephants and a wall, the lead elephant "Donkey" suddenly turned around and attacked "Putschie", another elephant. Putschie was in turn pushed into Nilsson, pinning him against the wall. The event is thought to be an accident.

In 2011, during the construction of the new cable railway, a worker was caught in a drill and passed away instantly.

Between 1991 and 2012 the park held the project "Närkontakt Varg" (Close contact with wolves) for paying visitor groups. The project was a big success, with up to 8000 visitors annually. However, the project was terminated after a group of wolves killed the biologist and zoo guide Karolina Bördin in 2012. The zoological director at the time, Mats Höggren, was found guilty of severe neglect in his duty, and was given a suspended sentence as well as a fine. Kolmården Wildlife Park also had to pay the family of the victim a fine of 3,5 million SEK.

== See also ==
- Kolmården Tropicarium, an aquarium and terrarium adjacent to the park
