= Fallet (TV series) =

Swedish comedy-drama television series

- Genre: Comedy-drama; Police procedural
- Created by: Erik Hultkvist; Rikard Ulvshammar
- Written by: Erik Hultkvist; Tapio Leopold; Robin Muhr; Stefan Thunberg
- Directed by: Jon Holmberg
- Starring: Adam Godley; Lisa Henni; Tomas von Brömssen; Björn Kjellman; Lia Boysen
- Country of origin: Sweden
- Original languages: Swedish; English
- No. of seasons: 1
- No. of episodes: 8

Production
- Production locations: Sweden; United Kingdom
- Running time: 30 min.
- Production companies: SVT; FLX; Film i Väst and DR; Nordisk Film & TV Fond

Original release
- Network: SVT1
- Release: 14 April 2017

Fallet (The Case) is a Swedish comedy-drama television series, a spoof on the Nordic noir detective genre. It premiered 14 April 2017 on Swedish channel SVT1 before being acquired by Netflix. It is a co-production of SVT, FLX, Film i Väst and DR, supported by Nordisk Film & TV Fond. The series stars Lisa Henni as Sophie Borg and Adam Godley as DCI Tom Brown, two mediocre detectives who pair up to investigate a murder.

In November 2017, Fallet was named best comedy drama at C21's International Drama Awards in London. American cable network Showtime is developing a remake from Shameless writer Etan Frankel.

== Synopsis ==
Incompetent detectives Sophie Borg from Stockholm and Tom Brown from St Ives, United Kingdom are given one last chance to solve a case after the macabre murder of an Englishman in Borg's fictionalized hometown of Norrbacka. Norrbacka police chief Klas Wall, who is about to retire, is overjoyed at the excitement of the case.

== Cast ==
- Adam Godley as DCI Tom Brown
- Lisa Henni as Sophie Borg
- Tomas von Brömssen as Klas Wall
- Christoffer Nordenrot as Bill Wall
- Björn Granath as Arne Arneson
- Björn Kjellman as Benny Arneson
- Lia Boysen as Kristina von Borg
- Dag Malmberg as Melcher von Borg
- Magnus Krepper as Åke Klint
- Stina Rautelin as Sonja Mustanaamio
- Erik Madsen as Colin Smith
- Meliz Karlge as Zarah Arnesen

== See also ==
- Scandinavian noir
