= Gustaf Spetz =

- Origin: Norrköping, Sweden
- Genres: Indie pop
- Years active: 2008– present
- Label: Imperial Recordings
- Formerly of: Eskju Divine
- Website: Official site

Gustaf Spetz is a Swedish singer. He started the band Eskju Divine along with two friends in Norrköping in 2002. The band went on to release four EP's and two albums, tour Japan and open for The Smashing Pumpkins on two dates before leaving the band in 2008. Furthermore, his single, "You and Me," was used by one of the leading South Korean smartphone manufacturers, LG, in its Optimus G model phone as a CF song.

His solo debut album Good Night Mr Spetz was officially released on January 28, 2009. Gustav Spetz describes his music as "A Ted Gärdestad on drugs that has listened too much to the Beach Boys and Beatles.”
He toured with Jonathan Johansson in 2009, did a few gigs backing Serenades (a pop duo between Markus Krunegård of Laakso and Adam Olenius of Shout Out Louds) in 2011, and accompanied Tomas Andersson Wij for his acoustic tour in 2013.

He also composed the soundtrack for the Swedish war/catastrophe film "Den blomstertid nu kommer" released in 2018 by Norrköping based film collective Crazy Pictures.

== Discography ==
Albums

- Good Night Mr. Spetz
  (January 28, 2009)
  Imperial Recordings
- Saknaden
  (May 8, 2013)
  Fähuset
- Den blomstertid nu kommer (film)

EP/Singles

- "You and Me" - Imperial Recordings (December 29, 2008)
- "Burn It, Crush It, Smash It" - Imperial Recordings (February 10, 2009)
- "Dewdrop" - Imperial Recordings (June 30, 2009)
