= Tropicarium Kolmården =

Kolmarden Tropicarium
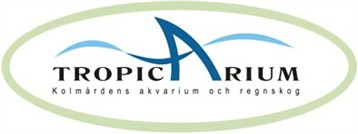

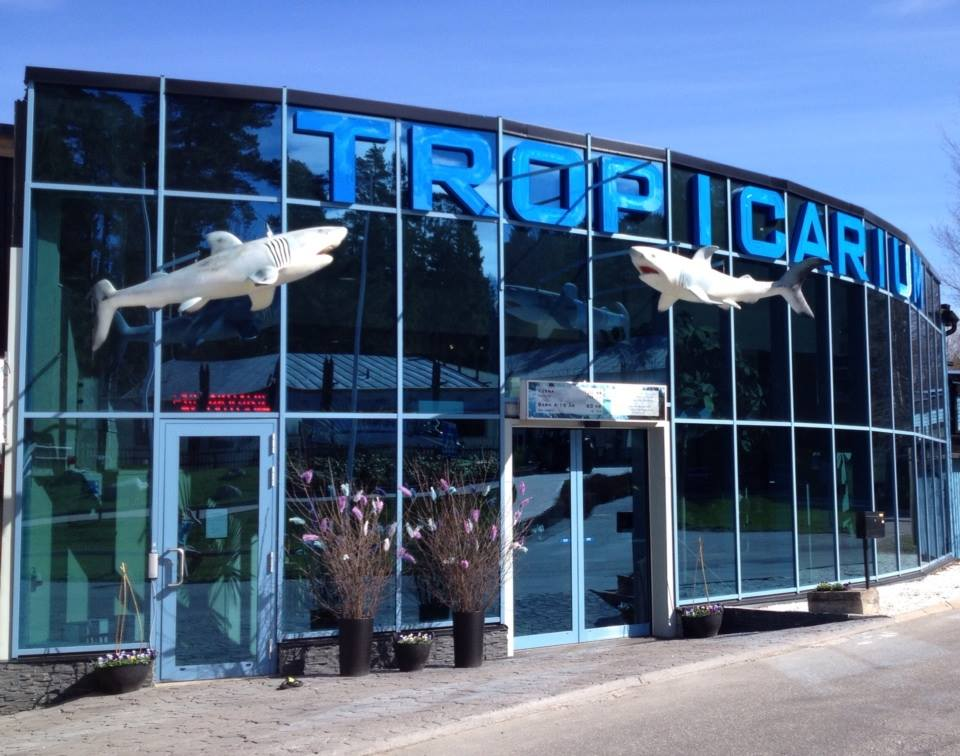
- Interactive map of Kolmarden Tropicarium
- 58°39′55″N 16°27′59″E
- Date opened: 1989
- Location: Bråviken bay, Norrköping, Sweden
- Floor space: 2,000 m^{2} (22,000 ft^{2})
- No. of species: 175 (vertebrates)
- Volume of largest tank: 500,000 L (130,000 US gal) (Shark aquarium)
- Owner: Tropicarium AB
- Public transit: Bus 432 and 433 with ÖstgötaTrafiken leaves from Norrköping central train station.
- Website: www.tropicarium.se

Tropicarium Kolmården is a public aquarium and terrarium, situated outside Kolmården Wildlife Park (but run by a different management), close to Bråviken and 25 km (16 miles) from Norrköping town in Sweden. Kolmården Tropicarium is one of Sweden's largest tropical exhibitions with a covered area in excess of 2,000 m^{2} (22,000 ft^{2}).

== History ==
Founded by Stig Gustavsson in 1972 and called "Kolmården Terrarium", with snakes and birds on show. Stig Gustavsson died in 1988. Kolmarden Terrarium was bought by Kalle Farkasdi (Kalle later founded the Tropicarium Budapest in Hungary) and his son Stefan Farkasdi in 1989. The new owners changed the name to Kolmården Tropicarium, building a half million litre shark aquarium as the main attraction and greatly increasing the number of species in the exhibition. The theme for Kolmården tropicarium is "A TREK THROUGH THE RAINFOREST TO THE SEA".

== Exhibits ==
=== Shark aquarium ===
Measuring 13 m × 11 m (43 ft × 36 ft) with a depth of 3.5 m (11 ft) and containing over 500,000 L (130,000 US gal) of seawater this is one of the largest shark aquariums in Sweden. It houses sand tiger, nurse sharks and various species of fish.

=== Seawater aquarium ===
Eight aquariums ranging in capacity from 1,000 litres to 18,000 litres. A wide variety of seawater species are exhibited, including blacktip reef sharks, bamboo sharks, moray eels, giant grouper, stingrays, scorpion fish and seahorses. The aquarium also exhibits many species of corals, and many reef fish, such as clownfish.

=== Freshwater aquarium ===
Eight aquariums ranging in capacity from 6,000 litres to 75,000 litres. These aquariums house argusfish, barbs, perch, scorpion fish, electric eels, pike, giant gourami, carp, labyrintiods, malawi cichlids, mbuna, mouthbreeders, moonfish, piranhas, giant botia, stingrays, South American cichlids, tanganyika cichlids, tiger barbs and neon tetras.

=== Biotope terrarium ===
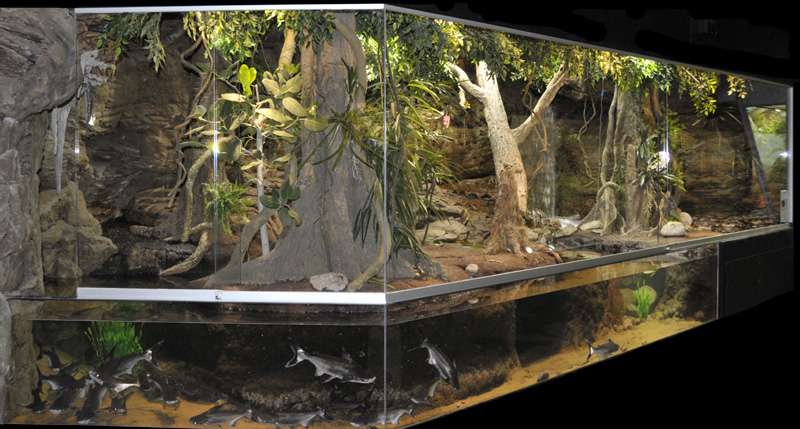
21 m^{2} (230 ft^{2}) large terrarium built in 2010 for reticulated python

Modernisation began in 2002 through to 2013, all terrariums were replaced by biotope terrariums. Biotope terrariums are replicas of the primary animals' natural habitat, including plants, fish and animals. Tropicarium Kolmarden now has over 20 biotope terrariums containing a large variety of reptiles, amphibians and mammals.

=== Rainforest – Jungle ===
There are two jungle areas housing new world primates: The first is approximately 100 m^{2} (1,100 ft^{2}), and is home to a family of common marmosets and three species of tortoise. The second of approximately 120 m^{2} (1,300 ft^{2}) and is home to a family of cottontop tamarins, and a pair of blue-and-yellow macaws. Both these jungles have water features containing various species of fish and turtles.

=== African Savanna ===
The African savanna area is approximately 80 m^{2} (860 ft^{2}) and is home to a clan of meerkats.

=== North American Swamp ===
The swamp area is approximately 300 m^{2} (3,200 ft^{2}), it is home for three American alligators and various species of fish. The exhibit simulates a tropical thunder storm every half-hour.

== Species ==
Tropicarium has at least 175 species of vertebrates, including mammals, birds, reptiles and amphibians.

=== Mammals ===
Mammals are represented with carnivores and primates.

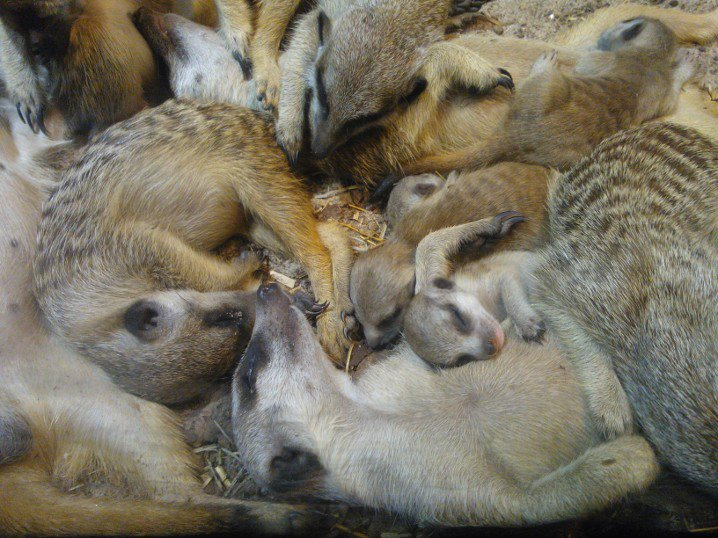
Family of meerkats at Kolmarden Tropicarium 2012.

==== Carnivores ====
1. Meerkat (Suricata suricatta)

==== Primates ====
1. Common marmoset (Callithrix jacchus)
2. Cottontop tamarin (Saguinus oedipus)
3. Pygmy marmoset (Callithrix pygmaea)

=== Birds (Aves) ===
1. Blue-and-yellow macaw (Ara ararauna)

=== Reptiles ===
==== Turtles and tortoises (Testudines) ====
1. Alligator snapping turtle (Macrochelys temminckii)
2. Chinese softshell turtle (Pelodiscus sinensis)
3. Hilaire's side-necked turtle (Phrynops hilarii)
4. Red-eared slider (Trachemys scripta elegans)

==== Crocodiles and alligators (Crocodilia) ====
1. American alligator (Alligator mississippiensis)

==== Snakes (Serpentia) ====
1. Black mamba (Dendroaspis polylepis)
2. Boa constrictor
3. Boomslang (Dispholidus typus)
4. Cave dwelling snake (Elaphe taeniura ridleyi)
5. Common viper (Vipera berus). Only on exhibition during summertime.
6. Corn snake (Pantherophis guttatus)
7. Cottonmouth (Agkistrodon piscivorus)
8. Eastern diamondback rattlesnake (Crotalus adamanteus)
9. False water cobra (Hydrodynastes gigas)
10. Gabon viper (Bitis gabonica)
11. Green anaconda (Eunectes murinus)
12. Green tree python (Morelia viridis)
13. King cobra (Ophiophagus hannah)
14. Reticulated python (Python reticulatus)
15. Rhinoceros ratsnake (Rhynchophis boulengeri)
16. South American bushmaster (Lachesis muta)
17. Taipan (Oxyuranus scutellatus)
18. Timber rattlesnake (Crotalus horridus)

==== Lizards (Sauria) ====
1. Chinese water dragon (Physignathus cocincinus)
2. Gila monster (Heloderma suspectum)
3. Green iguana (Iguana iguana)
4. Plumed basilisk (Basiliscus plumifrons)
5. Solomon Islands skink (Corucia zebrata)

=== Amphibians (Amphibia) ===
1. Anthony's poison arrow frog (Epipedobates anthonyi)
2. Cane toad (Bufo marinus)
3. Common tree frog (Polypedates leucomystax)
4. Japanese fire belly newt (Cynops pyrrhogaster)
5. Cranwell's horned frog (Ceratophrys cranwelli)
6. Dyeing dart frog (Dendrobates tinctorius)
7. Green and black poison dart frog (Dendrobates auratus)
8. Oriental fire-bellied toad (Bombina orientalis)
9. Yellow-striped poison frog (Dendrobates truncatus)

=== Bony fish (Osteichthyes) ===
1. Yellow and blueback fusilier (Caesio teres)
2. Bluestreak cleaner wrasse (Labroides dimidiatus)
3. Silver moony (Monodactylus argenteus)
4. Yellowtail clownfish (Amphiprion clarkii)
5. Blackwedged butterflyfish (Chaetodon falcula)

=== Cartilaginous fishes (Chondrichthyes) ===
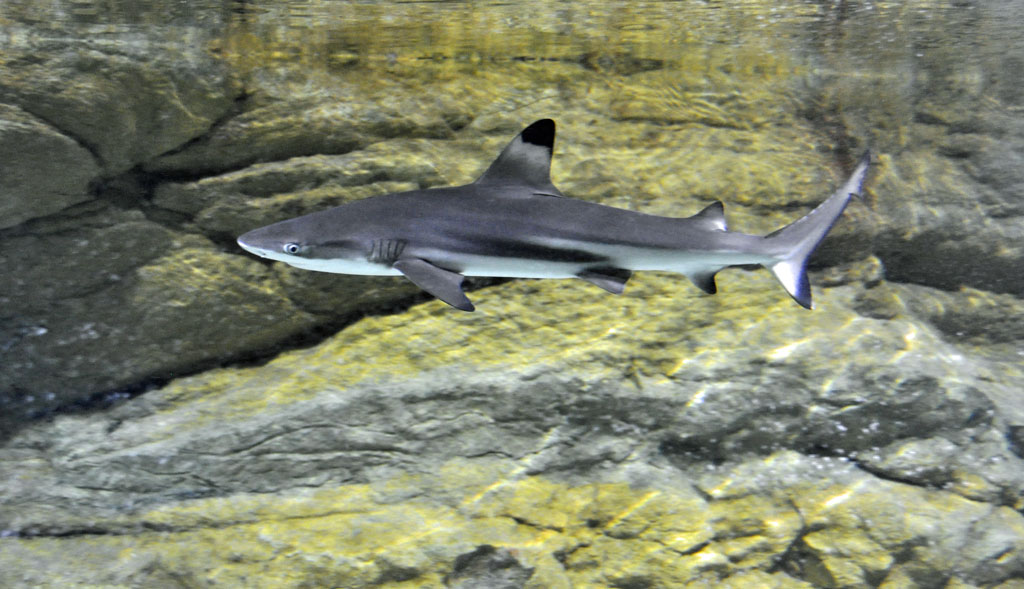
Blacktip reef shark (Carcharhinus melanopterus).

1. Atlantic nurse shark (Ginglymostoma cirratum)
2. Blacktip reef shark (Carcharhinus melanopterus)
3. Bluespotted ribbontail ray (Taeniura lymma)
4. Brownbanded bambooshark (Chiloscyllium punctatum)
5. Common stingray (Dasyatis pastinaca)
6. Giant shovelnose ray (Rhinobatus typus)
7. Sand tiger shark (Carcharias taurus)
8. Southern stingray (Dasyatis americana)
