= Sportbladet =

Swedish sports newspaper

- First issue: 8 May 2000; 25 years ago
- Country: Sweden
- Language: Swedish

Sportbladet is a Swedish newspaper about sport, mainly Swedish sport.

It is distributed together with Aftonbladet. The color of the newspaper is a variant of pink, often referred to as "baby pink". Braviken Paper Mill, Sweden is one of the producers of the paper used. Famous columnists include Simon Bank, Lars Anrell, Erik Niva and Lasse Sandlin.
