= Church of Saint Bridget, Norrköping =

Coordinates: 58.5898°N 16.1898°E

Church of Saint Bridget
- Sankta Birgitta katolska församling
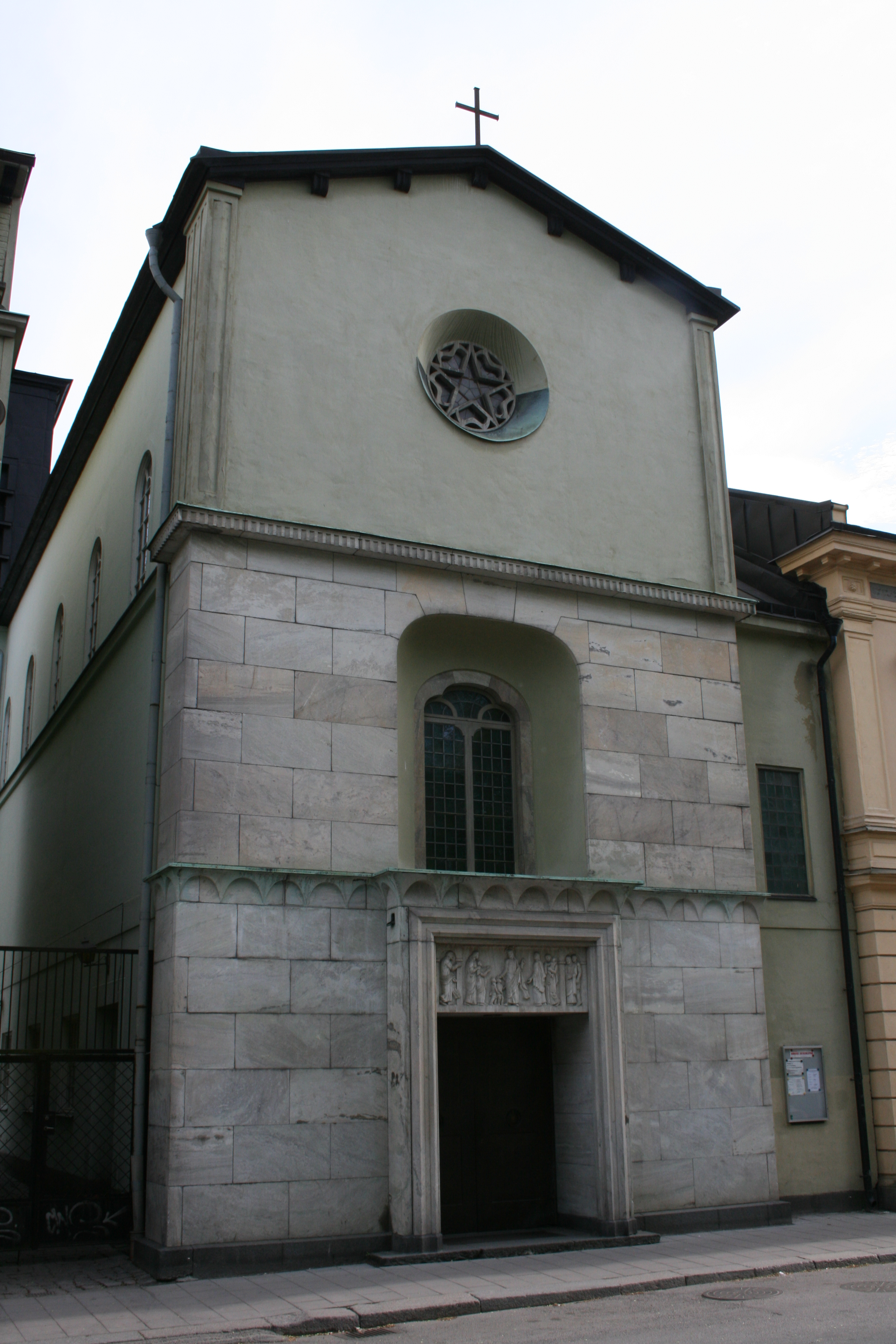
- Church of Saint Bridget
- Location: Norrköping
- Country: Sweden
- Denomination: Roman Catholic Church

The Church of Saint Bridget (Swedish: Sankta Birgitta katolska församling) (which means "Catholic Parish of St. Bridget" and also called Sankta Birgittakyrkan) is the name given to a religious building affiliated with the Catholic Church works as a parish in Norrköping, a city in the province of Östergötland in Sweden. The congregation belongs to the Diocese of Stockholm (Stockholms stift Katolska) .

The Catholic priest Bernard zu Stolberg was installed in 1897 in Norrköping, with the aim of building a church. Stolberg was the parochial vicar in the period between 1897 and 1925.

In 1903 he established a chapel in Skolgatan 24. That the Catholic chapel stood for 25 years. The Church of St. Brigid was consecrated only in 1928. In 1939, the parish was officially recognized. The building consists of two ships with 153 seats. The exterior has a marble facade.

== See also ==
- Roman Catholicism in Sweden
- Roman Catholic Diocese of Stockholm
