= Erik Niva =

Swedish sport journalist

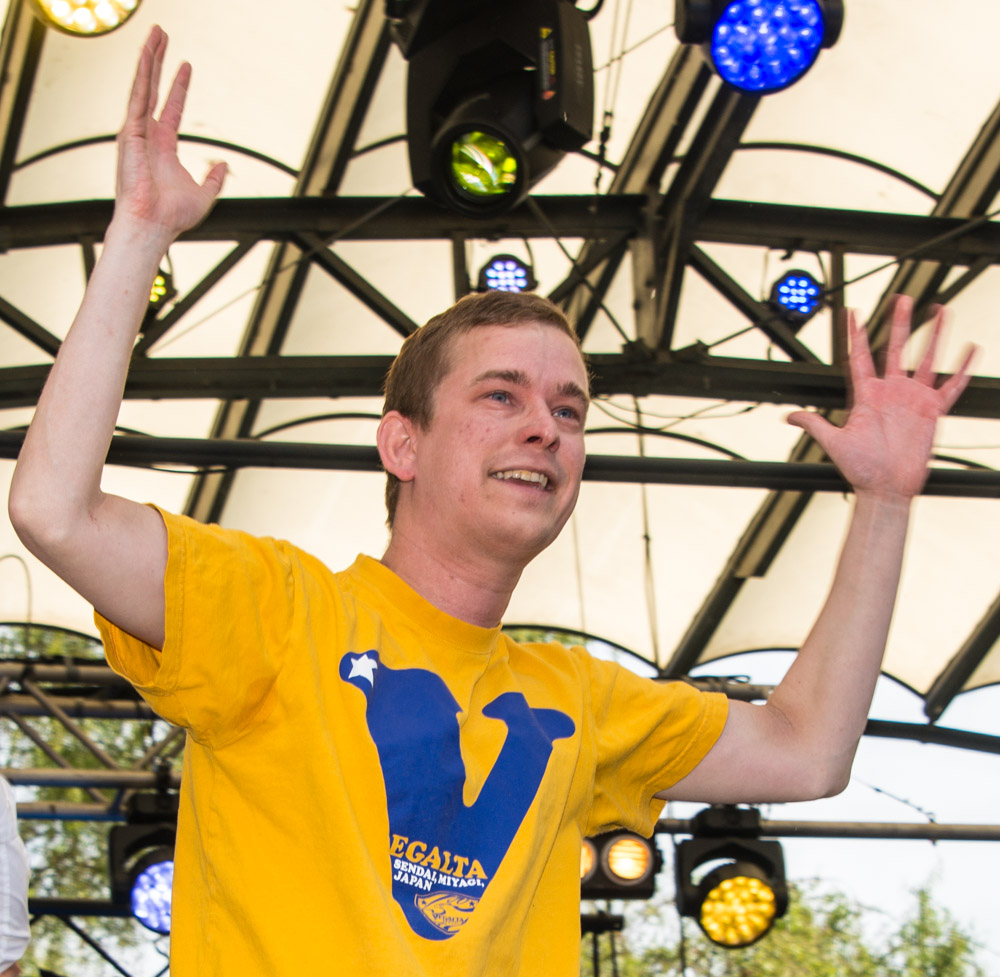
- Niva celebrating the Sweden U21 team in Kungsträdgården (2015)
- Born: 28 November 1978 (age 47); Malmberget, Sweden
- Occupation: sports journalist

Erik Magnus Niva (born 28 November 1978) is a Swedish football journalist for Sportbladet. He also is a studio expert for Viasat Fotboll.

== Career ==
Nivas first journalistic work was to cover the Swedish championships in sled dog racing for Norrbottens-Kuriren. His career as a football journalist started for the football magazine FourFourTwo in London. He studied journalism at Umeå University and also at Mitthögskolan and in 2003 he started working for Sportbladet.

In 2008, Niva published the book Den nya världsfotbollen, in 2010 he published the book Liven längs linjen. Since 2010, Niva works for Viasat Fotboll and is a studio expert for football matches such as in the Premier League.

In 2016, Niva participated in the SVT show På spåret in team with Charlotte Gyllenhammar.

In 2001, Niva participated in the first season of the reality series The Farm which was broadcast on TV4.

In 2019, Niva started the Swedish football-history podcast When We Were Kings together with Håkan Andreasson.

== Bibliography ==
- Den nya världsfotbollen – 2008
- Liven längs linjen – 2010
- Utväg: Fotboll – 2014
- Känner ni vibbarna? : fotbollen och det nya Sverige - 2016
