= Lisa Henni =

Swedish actress (born 1982)

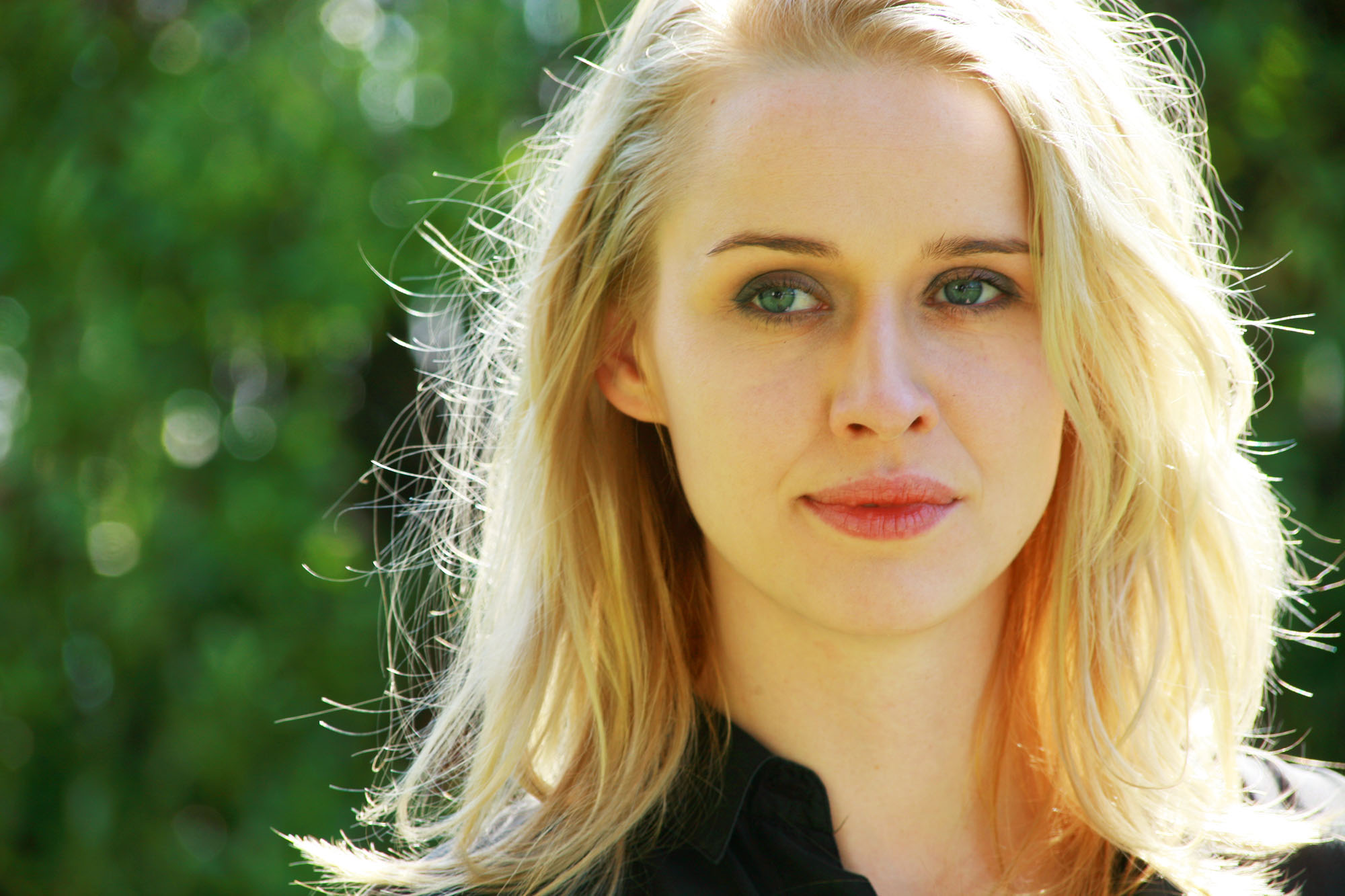
- Born: 19 September 1982 (age 43); Östersund, Sweden
- Occupation: Actress
- Years active: 2009–present

Lisa Henni (born 19 September 1982) is a Swedish actress. She was educated in London at the Mountview Academy of Theatre Arts. In 2010, she made her debut in the critically acclaimed Swedish movie Easy Money, playing the lead female role of Sophie.

In 2017, she played police detective Sophie Borg in SVT's police comedy drama series Fallet.

== Filmography ==
=== Film ===
Year	Title	Role	Notes
2010	Easy Money	Sophie	
2010	Att Bli Med Barn	Jonna	
2012	Easy Money II	Sophie	
2013	Wither	Ida	
2013	Crimes of Passion	Gabriella	
2014	Remake	Lisa	
2018	Den blomstertid nu kommer	Anna	

=== Television ===
Year	Title	Role	Notes
2014	Söder om Folkungagatan	Cissi	
2017	Fallet	Sophie Borg	
2018	Rig 45	Petra	
2021	A Class Apart	Jovanna Pavic	
