= Norrköping =

Place in Östergötland, Sweden

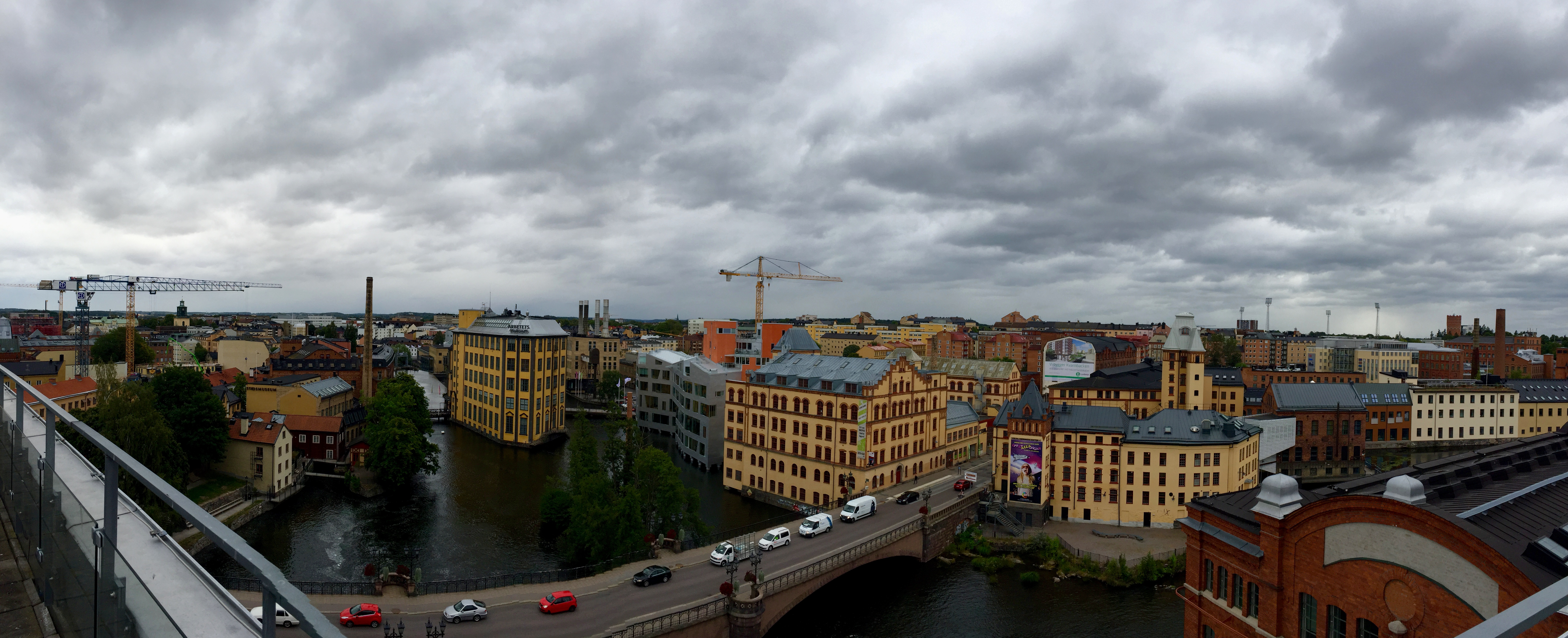
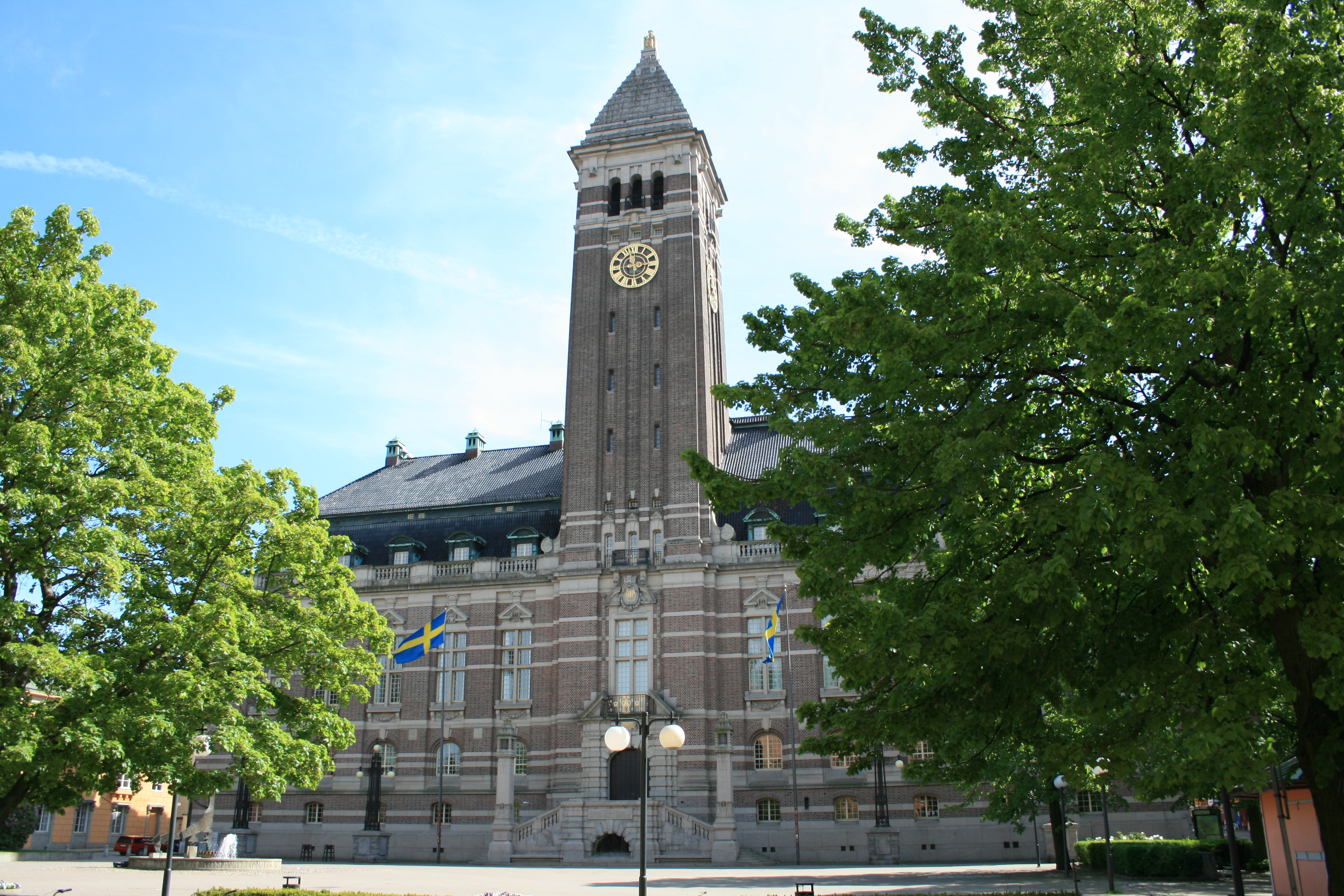
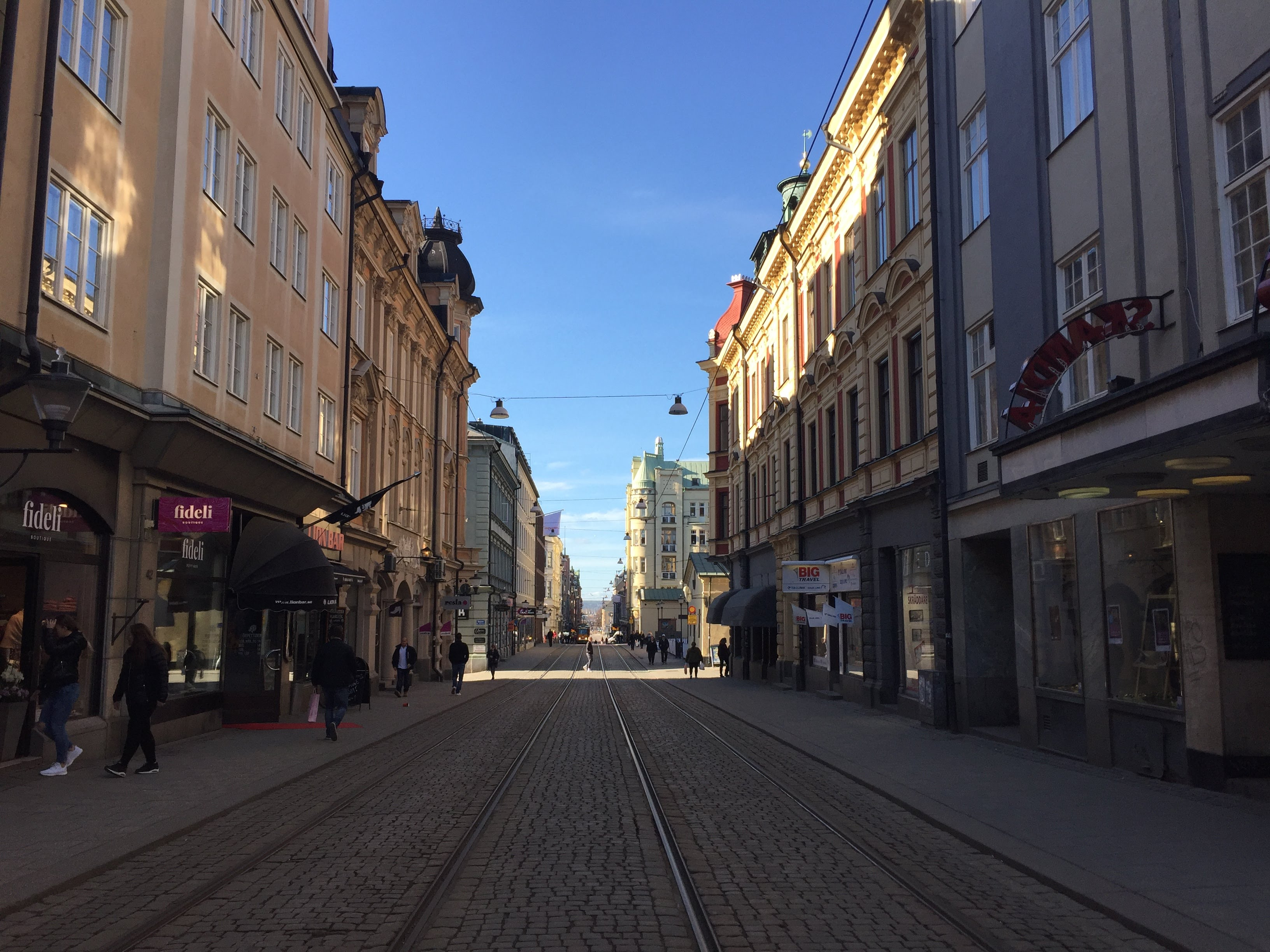
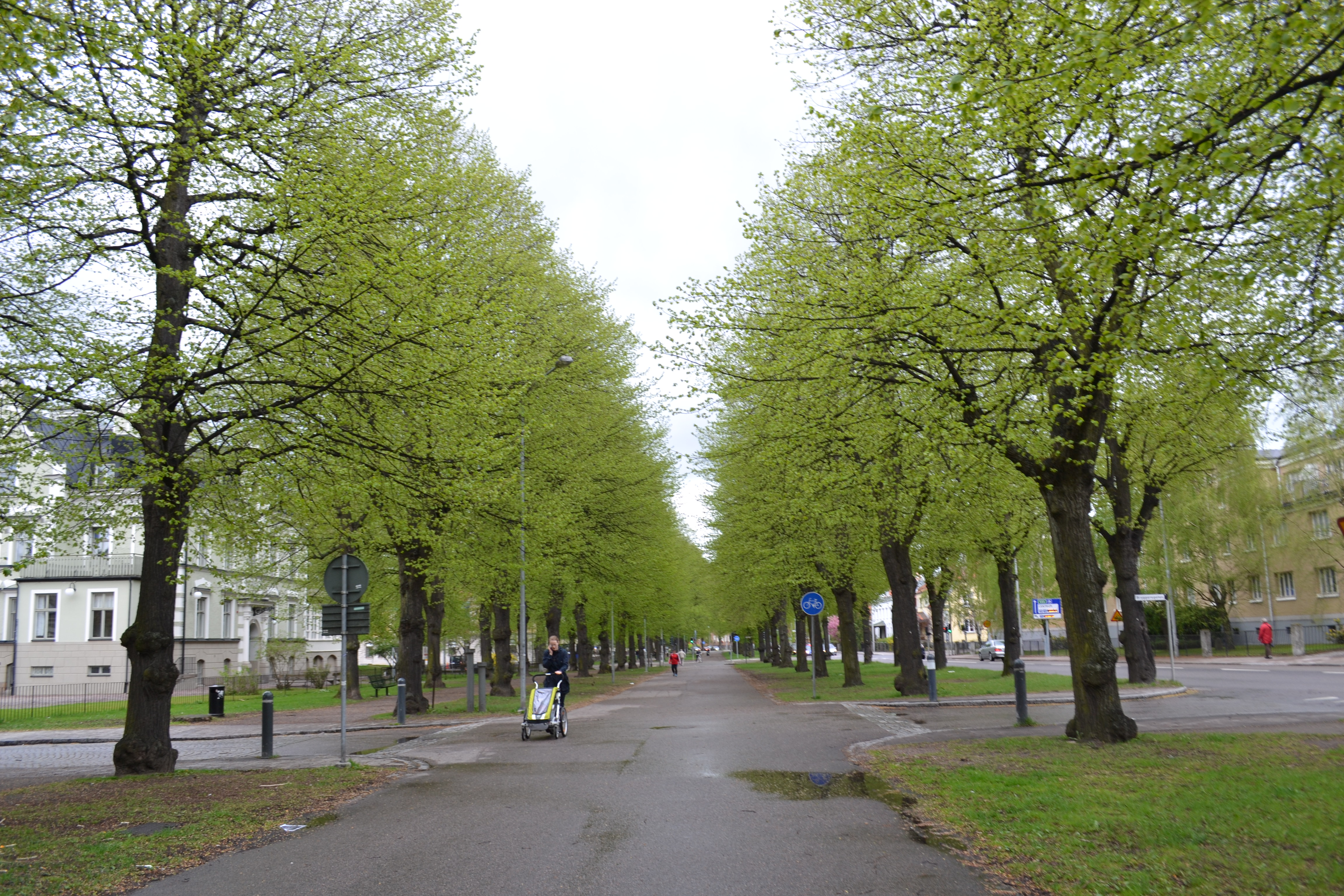
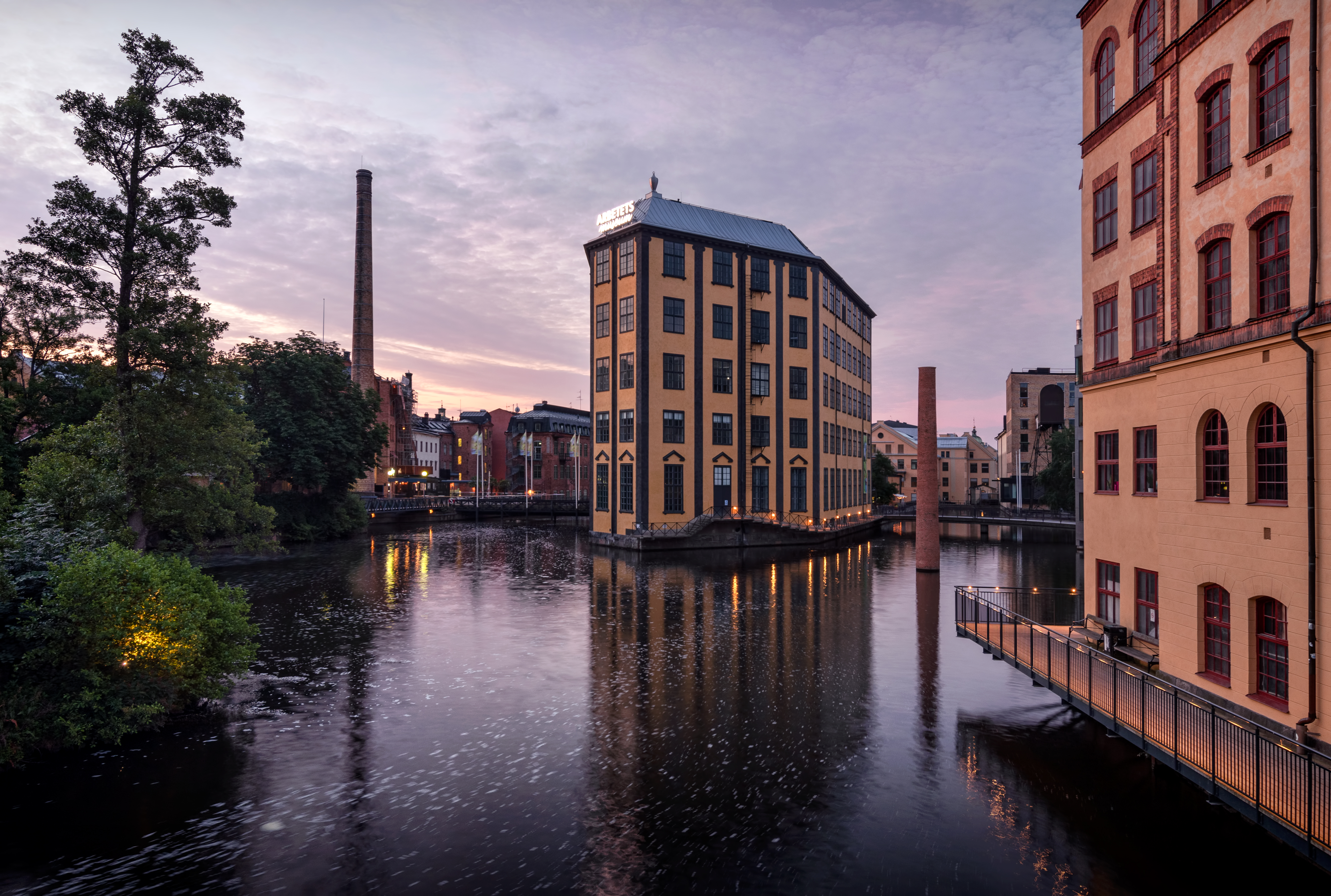
- Overview The City Hall Drottninggatan, Tram street in Norrköping Avenue "Södra Promenaden" Museum of Work
- Nicknames: Peking, Little Manchester
- Location within Östergötland Location within Sweden
- Coordinates: 58°36′N 16°12′E
- Country: Sweden
- Province: Östergötland
- County: Östergötland County
- Municipality: Norrköping Municipality

Area
  - Total: 35.68 km^{2} (13.78 sq mi)

Population (31 March 2016)
  - Total: 137,326
  - Density: 2,446/km^{2} (6,340/sq mi)
- Time zone: UTC+1 (CET)
  - Summer (DST): UTC+2 (CEST)
- Website: norrkoping.se

Norrköping (/ˈnɔːrʃəpɪŋ/ NOR-shə-ping, Swedish: [ˈnɔ̂rːˌɕøːpɪŋ]) is a city in the province of Östergötland in eastern Sweden and the seat of Norrköping Municipality, Östergötland County, about 160 km (100 miles) southwest of the national capital Stockholm, 40 km (25 miles) east of county seat Linköping and 60 km (40 miles) west of the Södermanland capital of Nyköping. The city has a population of 98,229 inhabitants in 2023, out of a municipal total of 144,980, making it Sweden's eleventh largest city and tenth largest municipality.

The city is situated by the mouth of the river Motala ström, at Bråviken, an inlet of the Baltic Sea. Water power from the Motala ström and the good harbour were factors that facilitated the rapid growth of this once industrial city, known for its textile industry.

== History ==
In 1993–1994, archaeological excavations at Borg in Norrköping revealed a farmstead established in the 7th century and continuously used through the Middle Ages, later becoming a royal manor under King Magnus Eriksson in the 14th century. Structures dating from the late 7th century to around 1000 AD were uncovered, along with evidence of ritual activities beginning in the 8th century and a possible cult building. It has been theorized that the farmstead's location, near but not at the highest point in the landscape, may indicate an earlier burial ground adjacent to which the farm was constructed.

The city has medieval foundations by settlers around the Motala stream estuary, who used the falls and rapids to power their mills. The stream was also full of fish such as salmon. Exact dates are uncertain, but there are mentions of a church in the 12th century. It was dedicated to Saint Olaf, Norway's patron.

The first trace of the city's name is from 1283, when Sophia of Denmark donated her rights of salmon fishing to the Skänninge monastery. The town is estimated to have received city status in the early 14th century, although no written documents exist prior to a document from 1384. This document, signed by Albrekt of Sweden is stored in the city archive today. Köping means there was a market there, while Nörr or Norr means "north". There is a smaller town nearby named Söderköping, or "South market".

The city was the location of several battles in the ensuing centuries. As a consequence, nothing of the medieval Norrköping remains today. During the Northern Seven Years' War (1563–1570), the entire southern part of Norrköping was burnt. It was rebuilt by John III of Sweden, who designed the current street pattern.

In 1618, a weapon industry was established by supervision of Gustavus Adolphus. The harbour also attracted ships due to its proximity to the industries of Finspång. In addition to the weapon industry, a large scale industry of textile was also initiated. An important benefactor was the industrial man Louis De Geer (1587–1652). At De Geer's death, Norrköping had 6,000 inhabitants and was Sweden's second largest city.

The city again burnt in 1655, and again in 1719 during the Russian Pillage of 1719-21 when the Russians burnt it to the ground. Stones from the Johannisborg castle were used to build new houses, and today only a few stones remain.

During the 18th century it was rebuilt and several industries soon got a stronghold: In the 1740s, Norrköping boasted three sugar refineries; in the 1750s the large scale influential snus industry was established. From this time stems the city churches of Saint Olof and Saint Hedvig, and several other old houses. In 1762, the first theater in Sweden outside of Stockholm was established in the city, the Egges Teater.

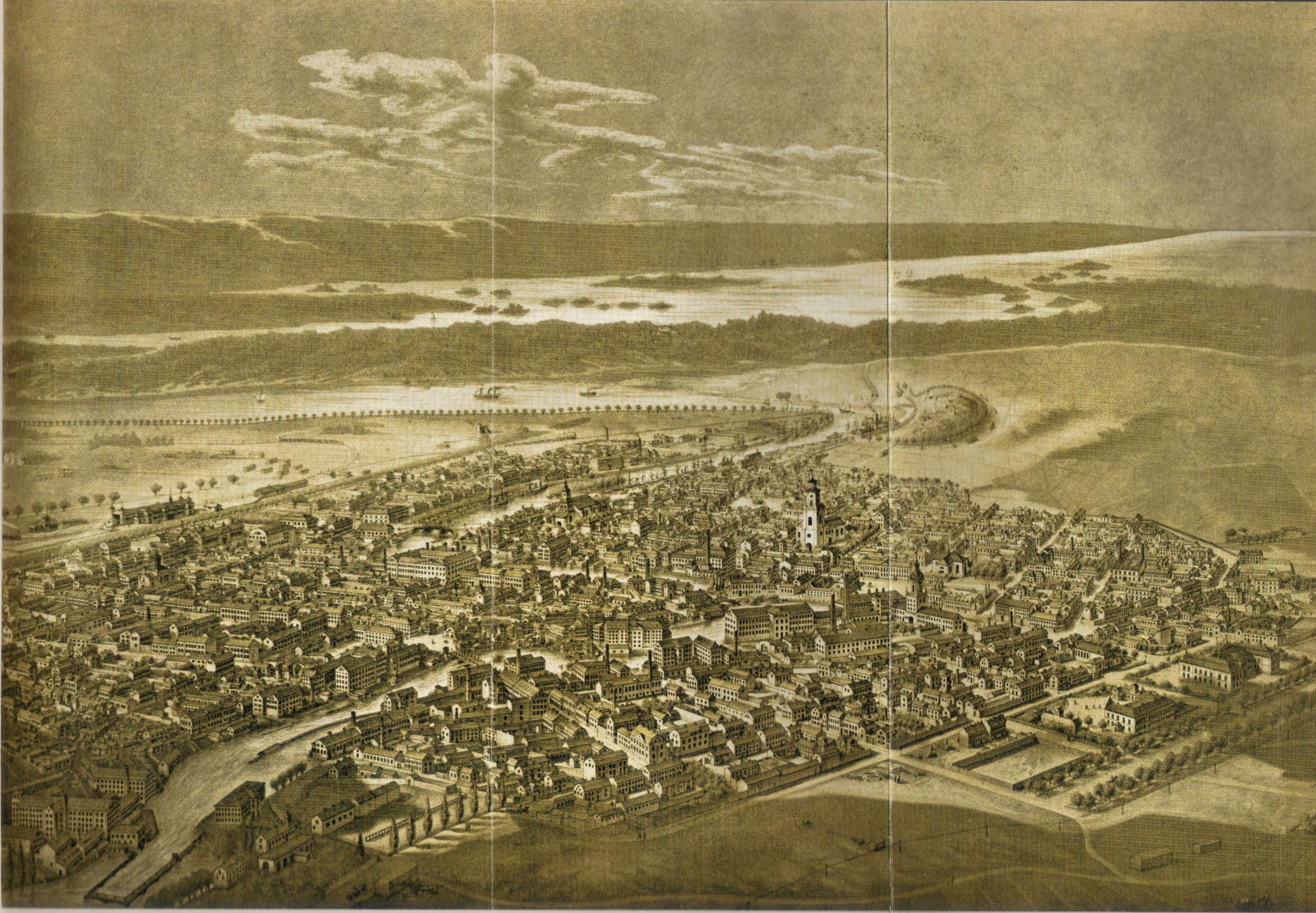
Norrköping in 1876.

Norrköping's importance again flourished. In 1769 the Swedish Riksdag assembled there. In 1800 King Gustav IV of Sweden was crowned in the Church of Saint Olof.

In the later 18th and early 19th Centuries, Norrköping was one of the three Swedish cities where Jews were allowed to live (see History of the Jews in Sweden).

The city again suffered fires in 1822 and 1826. Thereafter wooden houses were banned. In 1841 a ship industry was initiated as a branch of Motala Verkstad in Motala. In 1850 the industry had over 600 employees making it Sweden's largest ship industry at the time. During the remaining 19th century, the industries kept expanding. The area by the Motala Stream was developed further with the construction of a cotton refinery, and a paper mill was constructed in 1854, specializing in newspaper, and is still today exporting to customers around the world.

The industry, including textile manufacturers, also expanded into the 20th century. In 1950 a total of 54 factories had 6,600 employees in town. By 1956, however, 18 of them had been closed due to competition from countries abroad with lower wages, such as Italy and Japan. In 1970 only 10 factories and 1,200 employees remained. In that year, the renowned Holmen paper mill, with its 350 years long history, announced closure, and another 900 people were let go. To counter the effects, several governmental authorities were relocated to Norrköping from Stockholm. See also Braviken Paper Mill.

As of 2002, Norrköping is now seeing a revival, as a center of culture and education. The Norrköping symbol represents the "new" Norrköping.

== Climate ==
Norrköping had a humid continental climate (Dfb) for the reference period of 1961–1990, but it was borderline four-season oceanic (Cfb) during that period and has since more resembled the latter, with somewhat warmer temperatures year-round. In spite of it being located near the Baltic Sea, Norrköping has a relatively dry climate with precipitation levels averaging 508.2 millimetres (20.01 in) between 1961 and 1990. That would in turn be very low for a marine climate, but some way above more arid climates. The humidity for most of the year combined with there being no pronounced dry season keeps the surroundings green in spite of the rain shadow effect. Winter precipitation is quite low, but often falls as snow. On August 26, 2016, Norrköping set a nationwide record for the hottest temperature in the latter parts of August with 32.7 °C (90.9 °F) during a sudden and brief burst of extreme heat. The warmest temperature on record was set in July 2022 with 35.6 °C (96.1 °F).

Climate data for Norrköping (2002–2022 averages; extremes since 1944)
Month	Jan	Feb	Mar	Apr	May	Jun	Jul	Aug	Sep	Oct	Nov	Dec	Year
Record high °C (°F)	12.1 (53.8)	13.7 (56.7)	18.6 (65.5)	27.5 (81.5)	28.6 (83.5)	33.3 (91.9)	35.6 (96.1)	34.8 (94.6)	27.8 (82.0)	23.0 (73.4)	17.2 (63.0)	13.3 (55.9)	35.6 (96.1)
Mean maximum °C (°F)	7.8 (46.0)	8.3 (46.9)	13.9 (57.0)	19.7 (67.5)	24.6 (76.3)	28.6 (83.5)	29.5 (85.1)	28.4 (83.1)	23.1 (73.6)	17.0 (62.6)	12.3 (54.1)	8.5 (47.3)	30.6 (87.1)
Mean daily maximum °C (°F)	1.2 (34.2)	1.9 (35.4)	6.1 (43.0)	11.9 (53.4)	17.1 (62.8)	21.4 (70.5)	23.5 (74.3)	22.3 (72.1)	17.6 (63.7)	11.1 (52.0)	6.0 (42.8)	2.7 (36.9)	11.9 (53.4)
Daily mean °C (°F)	−1.4 (29.5)	−1.0 (30.2)	2.0 (35.6)	6.7 (44.1)	11.7 (53.1)	16.0 (60.8)	18.4 (65.1)	17.3 (63.1)	13.3 (55.9)	7.8 (46.0)	3.7 (38.7)	0.4 (32.7)	7.9 (46.2)
Mean daily minimum °C (°F)	−3.9 (25.0)	−3.9 (25.0)	−2.1 (28.2)	1.4 (34.5)	6.2 (43.2)	10.6 (51.1)	13.3 (55.9)	12.5 (54.5)	9.0 (48.2)	4.4 (39.9)	1.4 (34.5)	−2.0 (28.4)	3.9 (39.0)
Mean minimum °C (°F)	−14.4 (6.1)	−13.0 (8.6)	−9.8 (14.4)	−4.3 (24.3)	−0.3 (31.5)	5.2 (41.4)	8.8 (47.8)	6.9 (44.4)	2.1 (35.8)	−3.0 (26.6)	−6.2 (20.8)	−11.1 (12.0)	−16.9 (1.6)
Record low °C (°F)	−28.1 (−18.6)	−33.5 (−28.3)	−24.4 (−11.9)	−13.2 (8.2)	−4.0 (24.8)	−0.1 (31.8)	4.9 (40.8)	2.3 (36.1)	−4.6 (23.7)	−9.0 (15.8)	−15.9 (3.4)	−24.7 (−12.5)	−33.5 (−28.3)
Average precipitation mm (inches)	36.1 (1.42)	30.5 (1.20)	28.5 (1.12)	26.9 (1.06)	48.7 (1.92)	57.0 (2.24)	71.6 (2.82)	69.0 (2.72)	38.3 (1.51)	53.2 (2.09)	47.8 (1.88)	40.1 (1.58)	547.7 (21.56)
Average extreme snow depth cm (inches)	15 (5.9)	18 (7.1)	12 (4.7)	2 (0.8)	0 (0)	0 (0)	0 (0)	0 (0)	0 (0)	0 (0)	5 (2.0)	11 (4.3)	24 (9.4)
Average precipitation days (≥ 1 mm)	8.4	7.1	6.2	6.0	8.2	8.6	8.8	9.8	7.5	9.5	10.0	9.7	99.8
Mean monthly sunshine hours	46.3	75.9	168.4	232.7	264.3	282.0	268.3	228.8	168.5	103.2	46.6	37.7	1,922.7
Source 1: SMHI Open Data
Source 2: SMHI Monthly Data 2002–2022

== Main sights ==
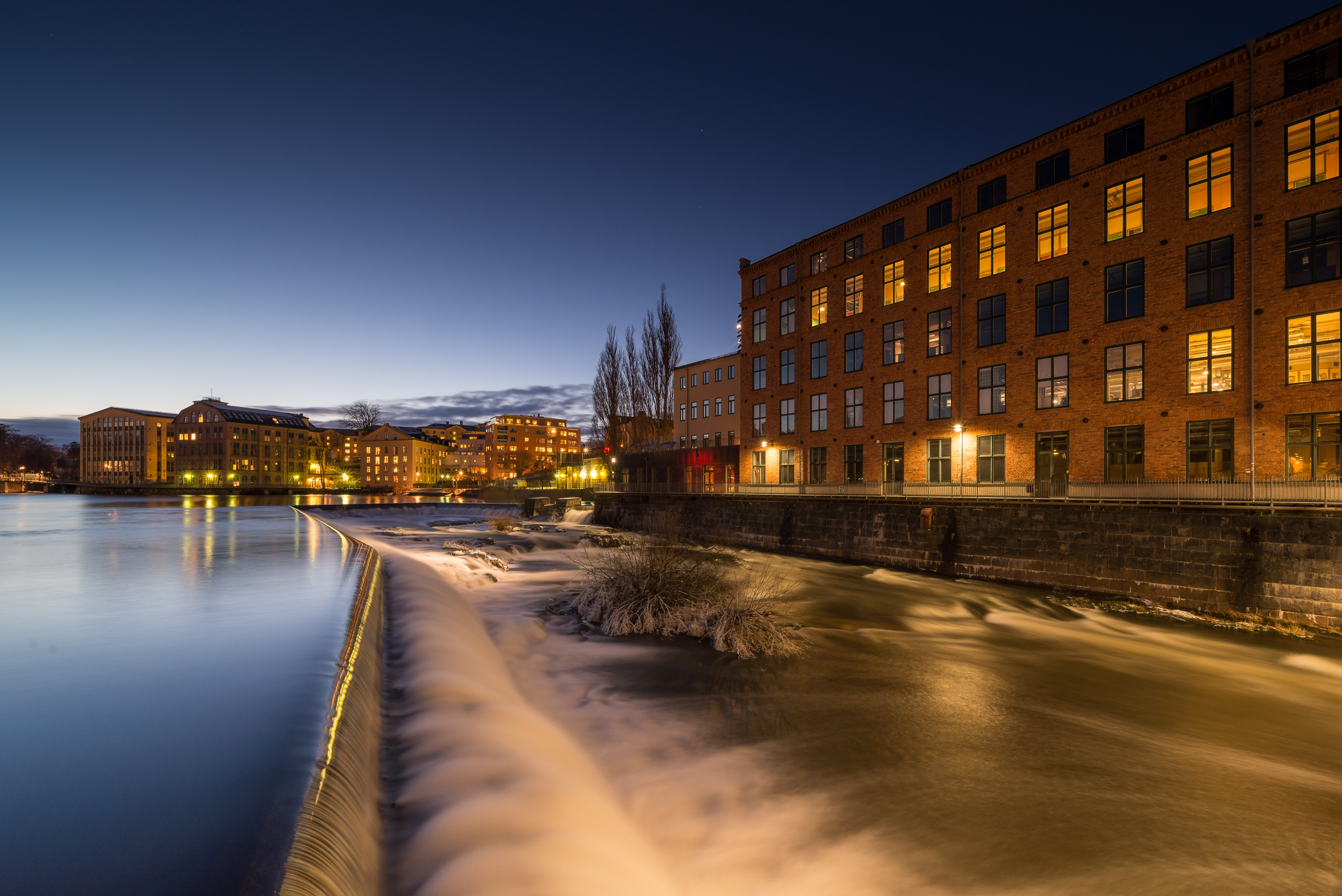
The historic industrial landscape in Norrköping and the river Motala ström

The Motala ström river flows through the city, with a walkway on both banks. Lining Motala ström is the industrial landscape where the old textile industries once were situated.

Since 1926, the cactus plantation in Carl Johans Park has been a landmark of the city, with 25,000 cacti planted every summer.

Kolmårdens Djurpark is a zoo located 30 km (19 mi) north of Norrköping. In connection to the large outdoor zoo, there is also Tropicariet, an aquarium, where for example snakes, crocodiles and sharks can be seen.

The archipelagos 50 km (31 mi) away from Norrköping are called St Anna and Gryt.

Other locations of note includes a campus of Linköping University, its own symphonic orchestra, an airport called Kungsängen with 170,000 traveling (2006), a high-tech industry park called Norrköping Science Park, and Petroglyphs from the Nordic Bronze Age.

== Sports ==
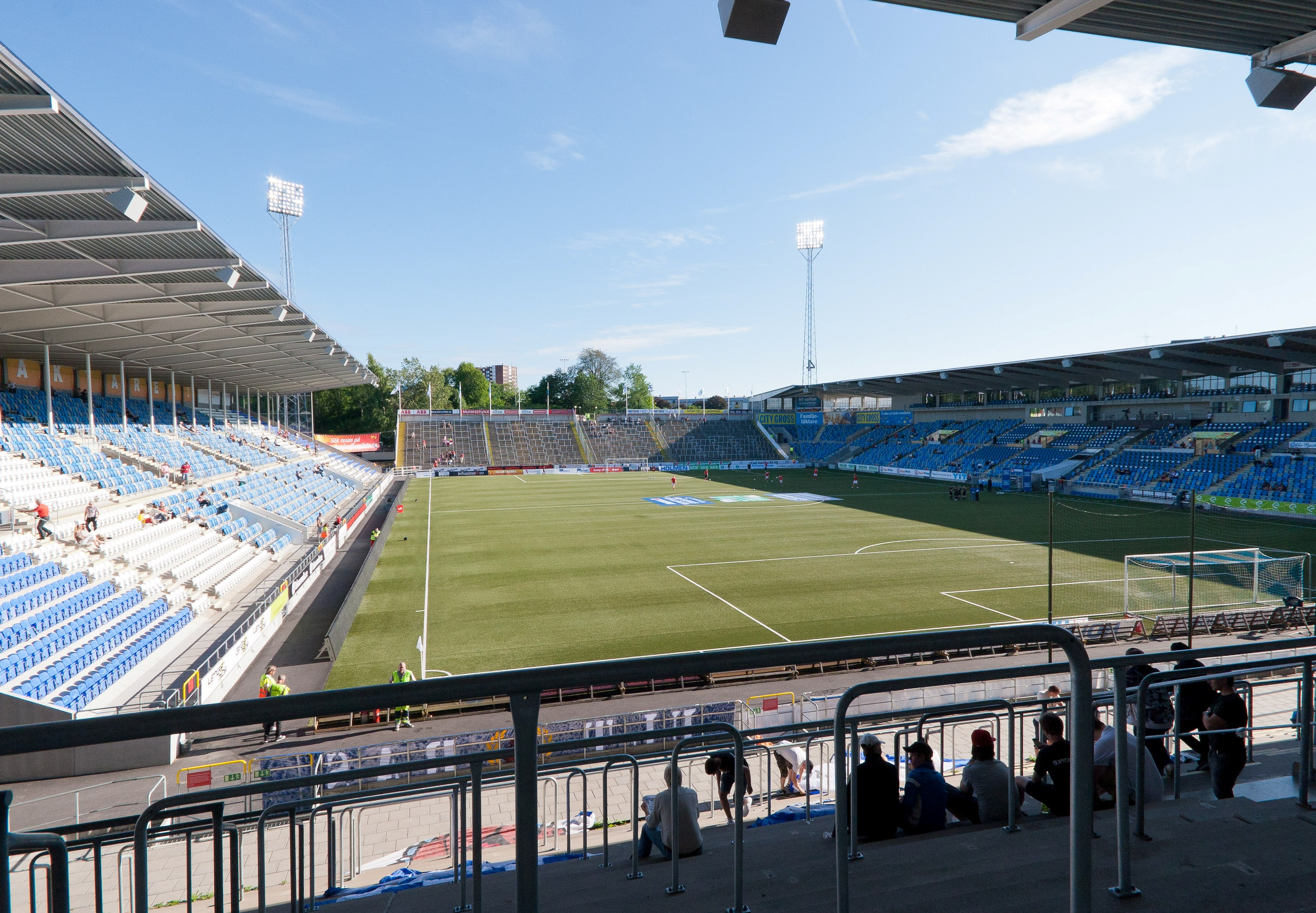
Nya Parken

- IFK Norrköping (Association football)
- HC Vita Hästen (Ice hockey)
- Norrköping Dolphins (Basketball)
- Norrköpings KK (Swimming), who swim at the Medley Centralbadet.
- NRK Troján (Rugby)

Speedway

- Motorcycle speedway takes place at the Norrköping Motorstadion, the stadium hosts the speedway team Vargarna. The team participate in the Swedish Speedway Team Championship and are six times champions of Sweden, they raced at one former venue; the old Norrköping Motorstadion in Dagsbergsfältet (the site of the modern day Medley Centralbadet) from 1948 to 1963. The Dagsbergsfältet track staged a qualifying round of the Speedway World Championship in 1954.

== Government agencies ==
As part of the Swedish government decentralisation policies of the 1960s and 1970s, a number of government agencies saw their national headquarters relocated from Stockholm to other parts of the country. A government inquiry suggested in 1970 that six such agencies should be relocated to Norrköping, with a particular focus on maritime and aviation transport and related services.

After parliamentary debate, five agencies were established in Norrköping over a period of years in the early 1970s. While reorganized, restructured and renamed, in general, the same agencies are still headquartered in Norrköping, namely:

- Air Navigation Services of Sweden
- Swedish Maritime Administration
- Swedish Meteorological and Hydrological Institute
- Swedish Migration Agency
- Swedish Prison and Probation Service

The establishment of government agencies in Norrköping was partly understood as a response to the decline in the textile industry, which had struck Norrköping hard in the 1960s. The city needed new jobs. The relocation of government jobs, however, also meant a major shift in the structure of the city labour market. Unqualified or highly structured industrial work in the private sector was replaced by more than 1 400 qualified and independent work positions in the public sector.

At a later point, the Norrköping cluster of transport authorities was augmented by one more:

- Swedish Transport Agency (Transportstyrelsen)

In 1997, a state university also opened a subsidiary campus in Norrköping, again, relating to the industry changes and being an important part of the government response to unemployment and labour market policy. Although not a headquarter, it is the seventh government agency stationed in Norrköping, and with more than 5 000 students on campus it is a major hub of activities in the city.

- Linköping University, Campus Norrköping

== Logistics and Infrastructure ==
With a deep sea harbour, a position on the Southern Main Line railway, Norrköping Airport and being the intersection of European route E4 and European route E22, Norrköping is a location for logistics-related business. This is supported by the presence of three transport-related government agencies, the national weather services, and Linköping University's transport and logistics research and education programmes.

Norrköping is highly involved in the East Link, Ostlänken, which will increase travel speed and freight capacity on the Southern Main Line. As preparation, the Kardonbanan freight feeder line from Norrköping Harbour to the Southern Main Line was inaugurated in February 2021. A new freight railway terminal and a relocation of Norrköping Central Station is currently being studied.

Norrköping is one of two Swedish cities (the other being Gothenburg) that retained its tram system after the 1967 conversion to right-hand drive.

== Culture ==
=== Film and Visualization ===
From the 1960s, the municipality film club Harlekin is hosted at the Norrköping Museum of Arts, before being established as Cnema in 2010, neighbouring Visualization Center C and Linköping University. The latter provide research in visualization and 3D technique as well as interactive experiences in an 8K 3D dome cinema.

The film collective Crazy Pictures, founded in 2008, is based in Norrköping, and has produced its two full length feature films The Unthinkable (Den Blomstertid nu kommer, 2018) and UFO Sweden in Norrköping.

Author Emelie Schepp sets her crime novels in and around Norrköping, with Jana Berzelius of the Norrköping Public Prosecution Area Office as the main character. The 2024 crime drama Jana: Marked for Life based on Schepp's novel with the same name, was filmed in Norrköping.

=== Museums ===
Norrköpings konstmuseum (Norrköping Museum of Art) focusing on Swedish modernism and contemporary art. The museum building is designed by city architect Kurt von Schmalensee, situated at Kristinaplatsen next to the City Library. It was founded by a private donation in 1901, and is operated by Norrköping municipality.

Norrköpings stadsmuseum, founded in 1981, tells the history of the city with a focus on its industrial history. Situated in the old industrial quarter on the river Strömmen, the permanent expositions describes the development of Norrköping from Bronze Age to the early 17th century industrial era. The museum is also curator of numerous Bronze Age petroglyphs and ancient monuments situated in and around the city.

Next to Norrköpings stadsmuseum, the Museum of Work (Arbetets museum) is located in iconic building Strykjärnet, a former weaving mill operated by Holmens Bruk until 1962. The museum documents work and everyday life by collecting personal stories about people's professional lives. Since 2009, the museum also houses the EWK – Center for Political Illustration Art, based on the work of satirist Ewert Karlsson. The museum is operated by a charity established by national trade union centers LO and TCO, two popular education organizations and the consumer cooperative KF.

Ståhl Collection opened in October 2020, and hosts the private collection of local housing magnate Mikael Ståhl. The museum is located in the old industrial area of Norrköping city centre, and mainly features paintings and sculptures, from the 1950s to contemporary works. Ståhl commenced his collection in 1981. The museum is privately held and operated.

=== Music ===
The Norrköping Symphony Orchestra (Norrköpings symfoniorkester, SON) is a professional symphony orchestra, consisting of 85 musicians and based at the concert hall De Geerhallen, in the city center.

=== Theatre ===
Norrköping has a long theatre and revue tradition, with Östgöta Theatre, opened in 1908, being Sweden's biggest regional theatre.

Egges Theatre hosting the first Scandinavian performance of Shakespeare's Romeo and Juliet in 1776.

Arbisteatern, dating from 1865, takes its name from Norrköpings Arbetareförenings teater, meaning The theatre of Norrköping's worker society. A 2016 Swedish drama/documentary, Sextemplet (Sex Temple), tells the story of Arbisteatern as a burlesque stage in the 2010s.

== Notable people ==
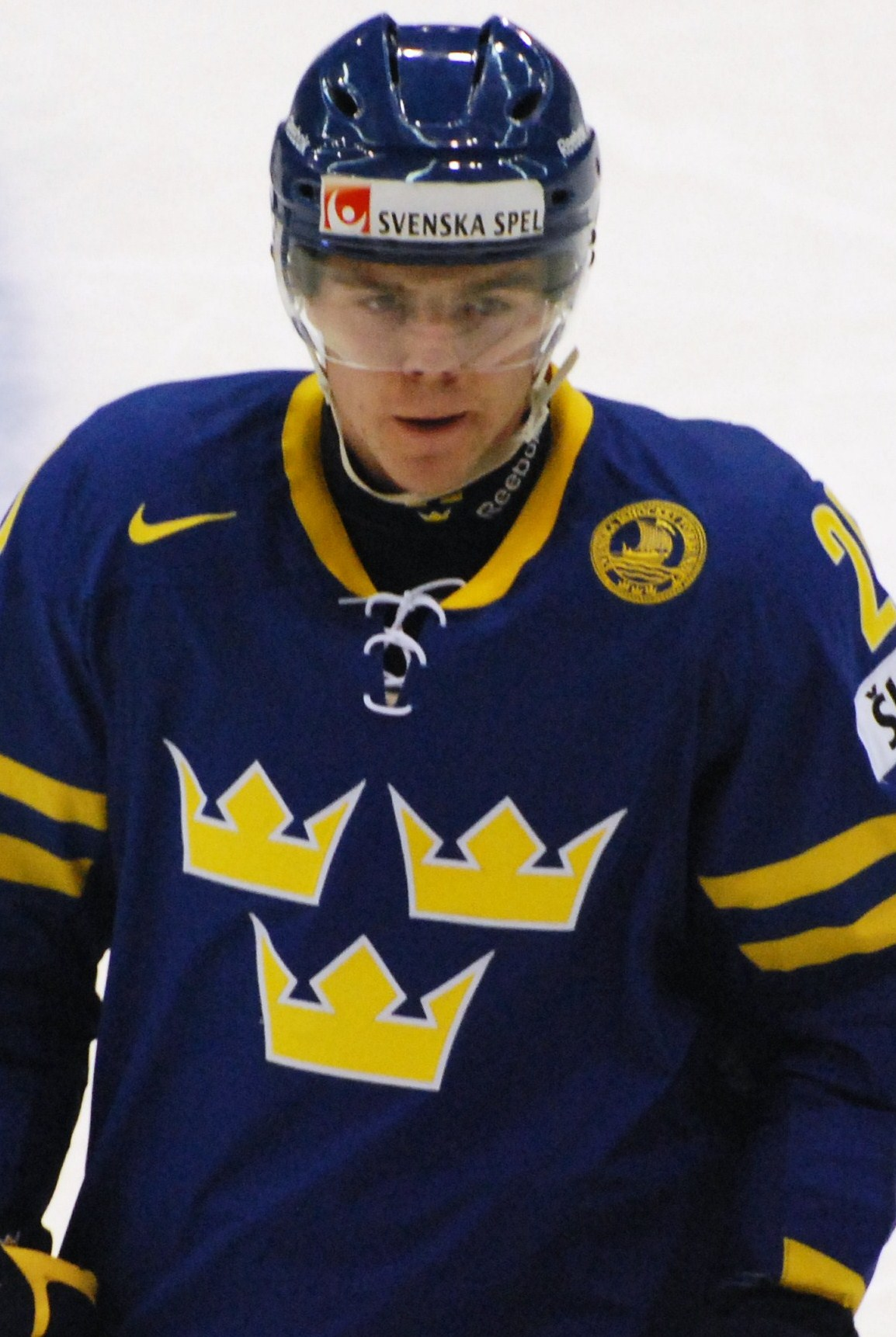
The Ice Hockey player Magnus Pääjärvi-Svensson comes from Norrköping

- Thecla Åhlander – stage and film actress
- Hannes Alfvén (1908–1995) – physicist, Nobel Prize winner
- Joannes Olaus Alnander – 18th Century author
- Johannes Årsjö – heavy weight champion
- Malin Baryard – Olympic equestrian
- Amy Diamond – singer
- Eva Gothlin – historian
- Elin Grindemyr – model
- Peter Harryson – actor, entertainer
- Ove Kindvall - soccer player
- Markus Krunegård – solo singer and member of Laakso
- Charlotta Löfgren – poet
- Mats Löfving – police chief
- Fredrik Lundberg – entrepreneur
- Herman Theodor Lundgren – entrepreneur
- Moa Martinson – author
- Ture Nerman – poet and socialist politician
- Christoffer Nyman - professional footballer
- Betty Olsson - suffragist and peace activist
- Magnus Pääjärvi-Svensson – NHL hockey player
- Carl Swartz (1858 –1926) – former prime minister
- Olof Peter Swartz (1760–1818) – botanist and taxonomist
- Jeffery Taylor – basketball player
- Michael B. Tretow – producer and audio engineer
- Pernilla Wiberg – alpine skier, double Olympic gold medalist
- Georg Aberg - Long and Triple Jumper

== See also ==
- Church of Saint Bridget, Norrköping
