= Vittra (folklore) =

Creature from Swedish folklore

A vittra (plural: vittror) is a type of wight (a term for supernatural beings) in the folklore of northern Sweden. They are associated with herding, either cattle or reindeer; they are believed to live normally among humans and only reveal their supernatural nature if their livestock were mistreated. Like the hulder and the skogsrå, the vittra is associated with longing and desire. The vittra appears as a beautiful, female wight who seduces men in the forest.

== In popular culture ==
Vittror are central to the storyline of season 1, episode 4 of Hilda.

The Swedish film Vittra, known as Wither in English, has a Vittra as the main villain.

== See also ==
- Wight
- Landvættir
- Moss people
- Aos Sí
- Gnome
- Dryad
- Skogsrå
- Hulder
- Huldufólk
- Pukwudgie
- Leshy
