= Wildfire (Kolmården Wildlife Park) =

Wooden roller coaster in Sweden

Kolmården Wildlife Park
- Location: Kolmården Wildlife Park
- Coordinates: 58°39′55″N 16°27′59″E
- Status: Operating
- Opening date: 28 June 2016
- Cost: 110 million SEK ($11,990,000 USD as of August 2018)

General statistics
- Type: Wood
- Manufacturer: Rocky Mountain Construction
- Designer: Alan Schilke
- Model: Topper Track - Custom
- Track layout: Terrain
- Lift/launch system: Chain lift hill
- Height: 56.02 m (183.8 ft)
- Drop: 49 m (161 ft)
- Length: 1,265 m (4,150 ft)
- Speed: 115 km/h (71 mph)
- Inversions: 3
- Duration: 2:00
- Max vertical angle: 83°
- Capacity: 960 riders per hour
- G-force: 4
- Trains: 2 trains with 6 cars; riders arranged 2 across in 2 rows for a total of 24 riders per train
- Website: Official website
- Wildfire at RCDB

Wildfire is a wooden roller coaster at Kolmården Wildlife Park located in Kolmården, Sweden. Manufactured by Rocky Mountain Construction, the roller coaster is both the fastest wooden coaster in Europe, and the joint-tallest wooden coaster in the world. Throughout the 2-minute ride, trains travel through three inversions and twelve airtime hills, whilst reaching speeds of up to 115 kilometres per hour (71 mph).

== History ==
In April 2014, Wildfire was revealed in a press release on Kolmården's official website. The roller coaster was Rocky Mountain Construction's first in Europe, and Vekoma manufactured the power and control systems of the ride. On 28 October 2016, the coaster ceased operations after only one season when its permit was revoked by the government citing environmental concerns. Speculation ensued that the ride may be torn down as a result. On 28 January 2017, a report surfaced that Wildfire would be allowed to remain standing while a license to continue operation was being discussed. The zoning for the roller coaster was officially approved by the county's council in March 2017, and Wildfire reopened in June 2017.

== Ride experience ==
After the train is checked and dispatched, it makes a sharp right hand turn into the 187-foot (57 m) chain lift hill. Once at the crest, it enters a right hand banked turn before passing over another crest and into the first drop. The train then drops 160-foot (49 m), reaching an 83-degree angle and its maximum speed of 71 miles per hour (114 km/h); before banking up into its first element, an inverted zero-g stall. From here the train twists through two airtime hills and two high banked turns before encountering its next inversion, a heartline roll. Following this, the track descends to ground level as it passes through several more strong airtime hills, prior to a second heartline roll. The ride finishes with a ski-slalom style right to left section before hitting the brakes and returning to the station.

== Awards ==
Golden Ticket Awards: Top wood Roller Coasters
Year									1998	1999
Ranking									–	–
Year	2000	2001	2002	2003	2004	2005	2006	2007	2008	2009
Ranking	–	–	–	–	–	–	–	–	–	–
Year	2010	2011	2012	2013	2014	2015	2016	2017	2018	2019
Ranking	–	–	–	–	–	–	28	29	17	16
Year	2020	2021	2022	2023	2024	2025	2026			
Ranking	N/A	17 (tie)	15	13	19	12	12			
