= Crazy Pictures =

Crazy Pictures is a Swedish film collective based in Norrköping, founded in 2008. They first found success with a short films series on YouTube, Poesi för fiskar, 'Poetry for Fishes', and released their debut feature film The Unthinkable (Swedish: Den blomstertid nu kommer) in 2018. Their second feature film, UFO Sweden, was released in 2022. They have also worked in TV adverts, music videos and TV production.

== Filmography ==
Year	Title
2009	Nakenlekar
2009	Du ritar fult
2010	Finns det några snälla barn
2012	Den blå mannen
2018	Den blomstertid nu kommer
2022	UFO Sweden

== Members ==
- Albin Pettersson
- Olle Tholén
- Rasmus Råsmark
- Hannes Krantz
- Gustaf Spetz
- Victor Danell
