= Book paper =

Paper made for a book

A book paper (or publishing paper) is a paper that is designed specifically for the publication of printed books.

Traditionally, book papers are off-white or low-white papers (easier to read), are opaque to minimise the show-through of text from one side of the page to the other, and are (usually) made to tighter caliper or thickness specifications, particularly for case-bound books. Typically, books papers are light-weight papers 60 to 90 g/m^{2} and often specified by their caliper/substance ratios (volume basis). For example, a bulky 80 g/m^{2} paper may have a caliper of 120 micrometres (0.12 mm) which would be Volume 15 (120×10/80), whereas a low bulk 80 g/m^{2} may have a caliper of 88 micrometres, giving a volume 11. This volume basis then allows the calculation of a book's PPI (printed pages per inch), which is an important factor for the design of book jackets and the binding of the finished book.

Different paper qualities can be used as book paper depending on the type of book. Machine-finished coated papers, woodfree uncoated papers, coated fine papers, and special fine papers are common paper grades.

Standard page sizes for book paper can vary depending on the book's genre (ex: sci-fi, horror,) and target audience (ex: children, teens, adults).
