= Christoffer Nordenrot =

Swedish actor

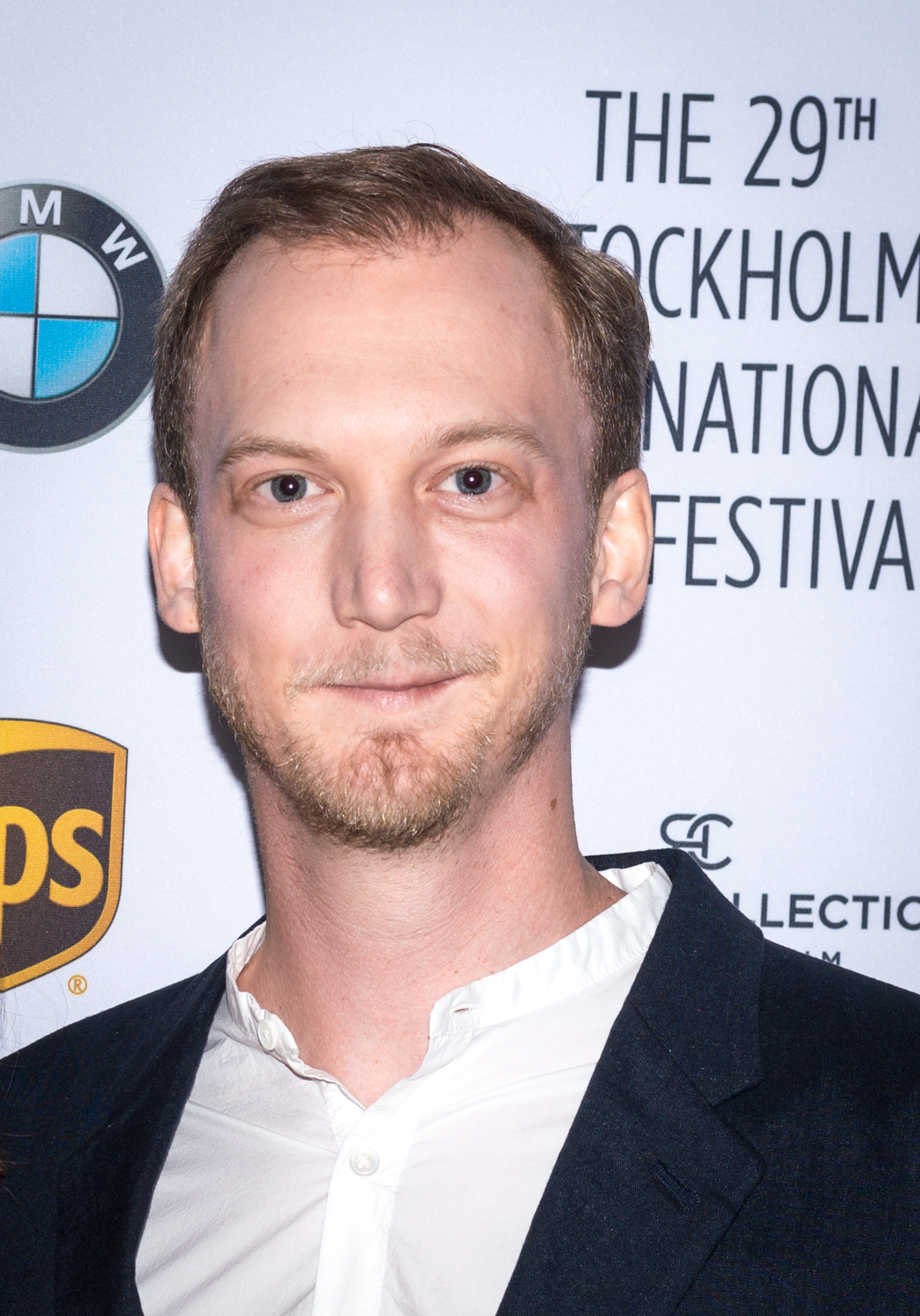
- Christoffer Nordenrot in 2018
- Born: Ola Christoffer Nordenrot; 9 March 1986 (age 40); Täby, Sweden
- Occupation: Actor

Ola Christoffer Nordenrot (born 9 March 1986) is a Swedish actor. He had the leading role of Alex in the 2018 film Den blomstertid nu kommer. Previously he has had roles in Kenny Begins, Wallander – Mordbrännaren and Sune – Best Man. He also appeared in UFO Sweden.
