= The Unthinkable (2018 film) =

- Theatrical release poster
- Swedish: Den blomstertid nu kommer
- Directed by: Crazy Pictures
- Written by: Crazy Pictures; Christoffer Nordenrot
- Produced by: Crazy Pictures
- Starring: Christoffer Nordenrot; Jesper Barkselius; Lisa Henni; Pia Halvorsen
- Cinematography: Crazy Pictures
- Music by: Gustaf Spetz
- Production company: Crazy Pictures AB
- Distributed by: SF Studios
- Release date: 20 June 2018 (Sweden)
- Running time: 129 minutes
- Country: Sweden
- Language: Swedish
- Budget: $2.2 million (18.5 million Swedish kronor)
- Box office: $974 (USA) $6,390 (Turkey)

The Unthinkable (Swedish: Den blomstertid nu kommer) is a 2018 Swedish thriller disaster war film produced by Crazy Pictures, starring Christoffer Nordenrot, Lisa Henni, Jesper Barkselius and Pia Halvorsen. The film imagines a scenario in which Sweden is invaded during a rainy summer.

== Plot ==
In 2005, Alex lives in a village with his mother Klara and his cruel, unloving father Björn. Klara finally leaves the family, Alex's closest friend Anna moves to Stockholm, and Alex moves in with his uncle.

Ten years later, Alex has become a famous musician in Stockholm. During Midsummer, the city is struck by multiple explosions, one of which kills his mother. Alex splits with his manager and goes back to his home village to buy the church piano that he and Anna used to play when they were younger. There, Alex again meets Anna, who has moved back to the village. When he learns that she has a husband, Kim, and daughter, Elin, he angrily departs.

As attacks on Sweden worsen and the military is activated, people begin crashing their cars in the rain and Alex returns to help Anna and her family. After the Parliament is destroyed and communications networks become unavailable, Anna's mother, a government minister, manages to escape Stockholm and heads into the country, where she is rescued by the military.

Meanwhile, Alex's father Björn, who works at a transformer station, kills a group of armed men who are attacking the electricity network. Helicopters and dead birds crash to the ground, apparently affected by contaminated rain, and civilians come to the station seeking safety in its bomb shelter. Among them are Anna and Alex, who is injured and unconscious.

After Anna leaves in search of Elin, Alex comes to and tells his unapologetic father that Klara is dead. Anna returns with her daughter and tells Alex that her husband and many others were killed by helicopters. However, Kim is in fact alive. When helicopters approach the power station, the civilians head to the village church to meet the military, whom they have contacted by radio. The enemy attacks the military and kills Anna's mother, but Alex destroys an enemy helicopter by crashing a car into it and Björn takes down another helicopter by crashing his plane into it. He dies but saves Alex, Anna, and Elin.

In the village church, which has been destroyed and is on fire, Alex tells Anna that Kim is still alive, then plays the piano until he loses his memory due to chemical weapons in the rain. Anna is taken away by Kim. News clips during the credits indicate that 800,000 Swedes have lost their memory, and images of Vladimir Putin suggest that Russia was behind the attacks.

== Cast ==
- Christoffer Nordenrot - Alex
- Lisa Henni - Anna
- Jesper Barkselius - Björn
- Pia Halvorsen - Eva
- Magnus Sundberg - Konny
- Krister Kern - Kim
- Karin Bertling - Grandma
- Ulrika Bäckström - Klara
- Alexej Manvelov - Tholén
- Yngve Dahlberg - Emil
- Linda Kulle - Pettersson
- Håkan Ehn - Lasse
- Tarmo Sakari Hietala - Berry picker
- Niklas Jarneheim - Uncle Erik
- Arvin Kananian - Sharokh
- Lo Lexfors - Elin
- Liselott Lindeborg - Lenny
- Rickard Lundqvist - Landers
- Carlos Paulsson - Policeman
- Rikard Svensson - Jögga
- Johan Wåhlin - Råsmark
- Eleonor Leone - Julia
- Erik Bolin - Incident commander
- Magdalena Eshaya - The beggar

== Production ==
=== Financing ===
The financing of the film started as a crowdfunded project on Kickstarter in 2015, where the project received 800,000 Swedish kronor ($100,000). After the initial crowdsourced funding, the film received more traditional funding, from SF Bio, Svenska Bio and others. The final budget for the film was 18.5 million Swedish kronor ($2.2 million).

=== Music ===
Gustaf Spetz composed the soundtrack to the film. It features a version of the Swedish traditional summertime hymn Den blomstertid nu kommer, after which the film is named. The hymn is associated with summer and the film is set during Midsummer.

== Release ==
The film was released in Sweden on 20 June 2018, two days before Midsummer in Sweden, with the film itself being set during Midsummer. The Swedish title of the film is the name of a traditional hymn strongly associated with summer, Den blomstertid nu kommer.

During the first weekend after its release, The Unthinkable was the second most seen film in cinemas in Sweden. In March, 2019 the company announced that the film had been sold to 100 countries, making it one of Swedish film industry's biggest exports in 2018.

== Reception ==
=== Critical response ===
On the review aggregator website Rotten Tomatoes, the film holds an approval rating of 78% based on 23 reviews, with an average rating of 6.8/10.
