= Bråviken =

Coordinates: 58°38′41″N 16°23′20″E

Designations

Ramsar Wetland
- Official name: Södra Bråviken
- Designated: 14 November 2001
- Reference no.: 1128

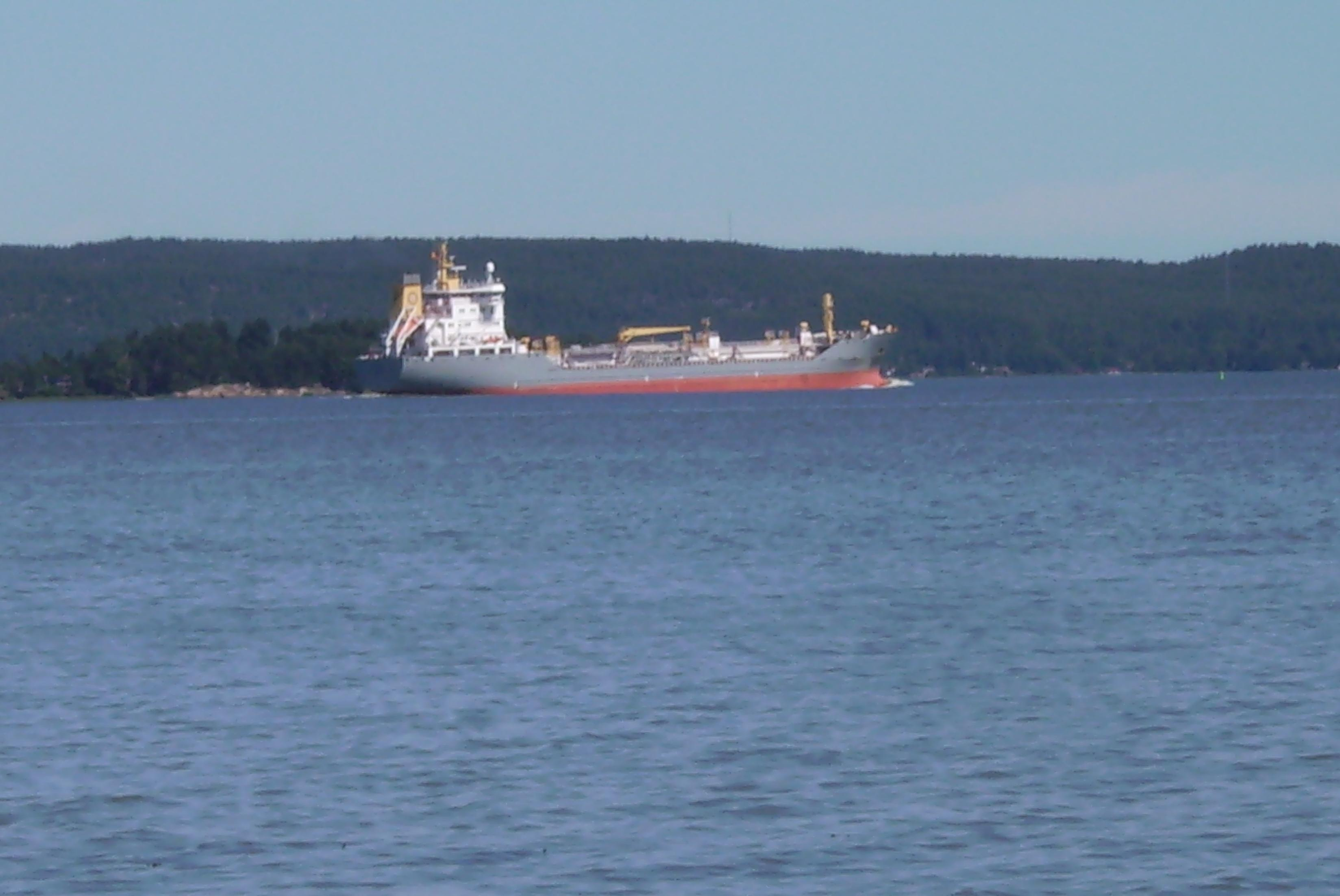
Bråviken

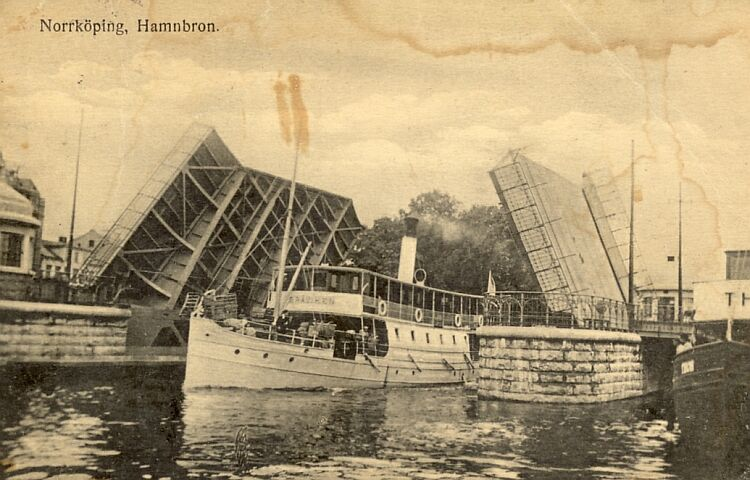
Bråviken in early 1900s

Bråviken is a bay of the Baltic Sea that is located near Norrköping in Östergötland, Sweden. It is an example of a fjard, a drowned shallow glacial valley.
