= Easy Money II: Hard to Kill =

- Film poster
- Swedish: Snabba Cash II
- Directed by: Babak Najafi
- Written by: Peter Birro; Maria Karlsson
- Based on: Books by Jens Lapidus
- Produced by: Fredrik Wikström
- Starring: Joel Kinnaman; Matias Varela; Dragomir Mrsic; Fares Fares
- Cinematography: Aril Wretblad
- Music by: Jon Ekstrand
- Production company: Tre Vänner Produktion AB
- Release date: 17 August 2012
- Running time: 99 minutes
- Country: Sweden
- Languages: Swedish, Spanish, Serbian

Easy Money II: Hard to Kill (Swedish: Snabba Cash II) is a 2012 Swedish thriller film directed by Babak Najafi and written by Peter Birro and Maria Karlsson. Based on Jens Lapidus's novels Easy Money and Aldrig fucka upp, it is the second installment in the Easy Money film trilogy and a sequel to the 2010 film Easy Money. Joel Kinnaman, Matias Varela, Dragomir Mrsic, and Fares Fares reprise their roles as four criminals of different backgrounds who all become involved in the hunt for money belonging to the Serbian mob. A third film, Easy Money III: Life Deluxe, was released in 2013.

== Plot ==
Three years into his sentence for drug trafficking, JW is granted parole. His parents and former girlfriend Sophie break off contact with him, but despite their violent past, he forms a close relationship with the now paraplegic Mrado. JW plans to profit off of trading software he developed, only to be betrayed by his business partner and former classmate Nippe, who takes full credit for the program. After assaulting Nippe, JW contacts Mrado, who proposes a scheme for them to become wealthy: they will abduct Misha Bladman, the accountant of Serbian mob boss Radovan and interrogate him for the money he stores. JW accepts and helps Mrado escape from prison to capture Bladman.

Meanwhile, Jorge enters into a deal to supply drugs to Serbian mobsters, but loses the drugs in a car accident. When his attempt to rob the mobsters of their money fails, Jorge is rescued by sex slave Nadja and escapes with the money after killing the mobsters. The task of tracking down Jorge is given to Mahmoud, Jorge's childhood friend and JW's former co-worker, in order to pay off his debt to the mob. Mahmoud reluctantly tracks Jorge down to the home of Jorge's recently deceased mother Rosita, but accidentally shoots Nadja when she opens the door. Jorge jumps off the balcony attempting to escape and Mahmoud, assuming Jorge died in the fall, retrieves the stolen money. Impressed, Radovan assigns Mahmoud and his subordinate Ratko to deliver the money to Bladman.

As Radovan sends his subordinates to deliver the money, JW and Mrado initiate their scheme and Mrado tortures Bladman for the combination of his safe. JW and Mrado arrive at Bladman's house first, which JW enters while Mrado keeps watch. When Mahmoud and Ratko arrive next, JW shoots Mahmoud dead, only learning of his former co-worker's identity after killing him. Mrado and JW also kill Ratko and take the money, but Mrado is shot in the crossfire. Knowing he has been mortally wounded, Mrado asks JW to deliver a note to his daughter Lovisa. JW is unable to deliver the note due to Lovisa being moved from her foster home, but tells Mrado she received it. Mrado hallucinates meeting with his daughter as he dies.

Jorge and Nadja survive their injuries and receive medical assistance. As they are loaded onto an ambulance, JW reads Mrado's note to Lovisa. He then burns the van with Mrado's body inside and walks off with the money.

== Cast ==
- Joel Kinnaman as JW
- Matias Varela as Jorge
- Dragomir Mrsic as Mrado
- Fares Fares as Mahmoud
- Madeleine Martin as Nadja
- Dejan Čukić as Radovan
- Joel Spira as Nippe
- Lisa Henni as Sophie
- Annika Ryberg Whittembury as Paola
- Lea Stojanov as Lovisa
- Prvoslav Gane Dzakovic as Ratko
- Peter Carlberg as Misha Bladman
- Monica Albornoz as Rosita
