= 48th Guldbagge Awards =

Swedish awards ceremony

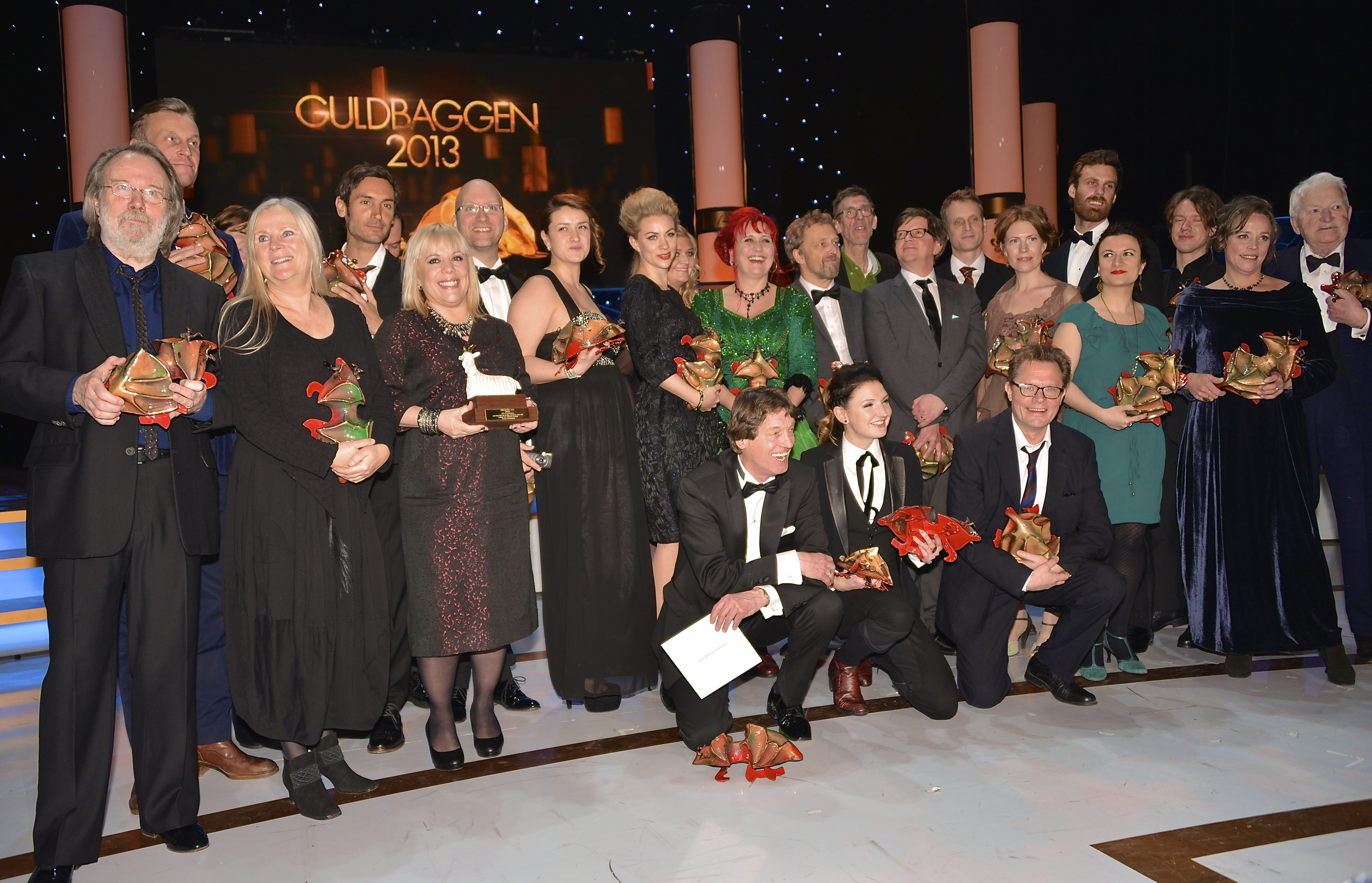
- The winners of Guldbaggen 2013 at Cirkus in Stockholm.
- Date: January 21, 2013
- Site: Cirkus, Stockholm
- Hosted by: Babben Larsson

Highlights
- Best Picture: Eat Sleep Die
- Most awards: Call Girl & Eat Sleep Die (4)
- Most nominations: Call Girl (11)

Television coverage
- Network: SVT
- Duration: 2 hours

The 48th Guldbagge Awards ceremony, presented by the Swedish Film Institute, honored the best Swedish films of 2012 and took place January 21, 2013, at Cirkus in Stockholm. During the ceremony, the jury presented Guldbagge Awards (commonly referred to as Bagge) in 19 categories. The ceremony was televised in the Sweden by SVT, with actress and comedian Babben Larsson hosting the show.

Eat Sleep Die won four awards including Best Film and Best Director for Gabriela Pichler. Call Girl also won four awards, all in the technical categories. Other winners included Palme and Avalon with two awards each, and The Last Sentence, Searching for Sugar Man, Dance Music Now, Amour, Easy Money II: Hard to Kill and Isdraken with one.

== The jury ==
Through discussions the jury appoints the winners of the Guldbagge Award among the three nominees in all price categories, except for the Honorary Award which is appointed directly by the Swedish Film Institute's board. The jury consisted this year of Jannike Åhlund (chairman), Anna Carlson, (actress and chairman of Teaterförbundet), Bengt Forslund (producer and writer), Anna Croneman (producer), Klaus Härö (director), Farnaz Arbabi (director and playwright), Matti Bye (musician and composer), Sylvia Ingemarsdotter (film editor) and Marcus Lindeen (director and playwright).

== Winner and nominees ==
The nominees for the 48th Guldbagge Awards were announced on January 3, 2013, in Stockholm, by the Swedish Film Institute.

Films with the most nominations were Call Girl with eleven, followed by The Last Sentence and Searching for Sugar Man with six. The winners were announced during the awards ceremony on January 21, 2013.

=== Awards ===
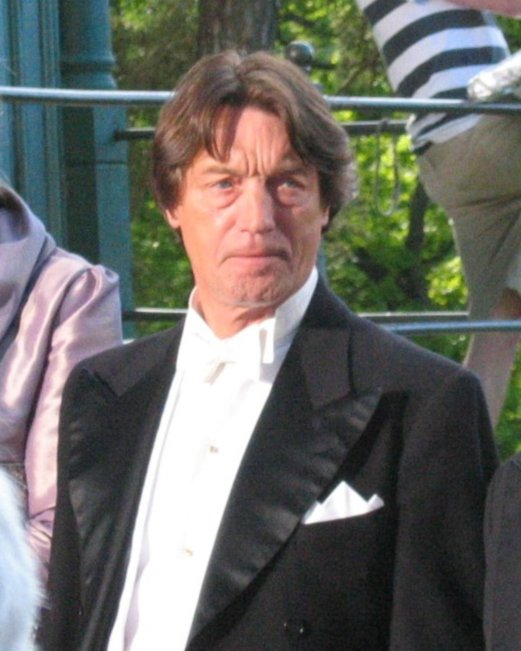
Johannes Brost, Best Actor winner

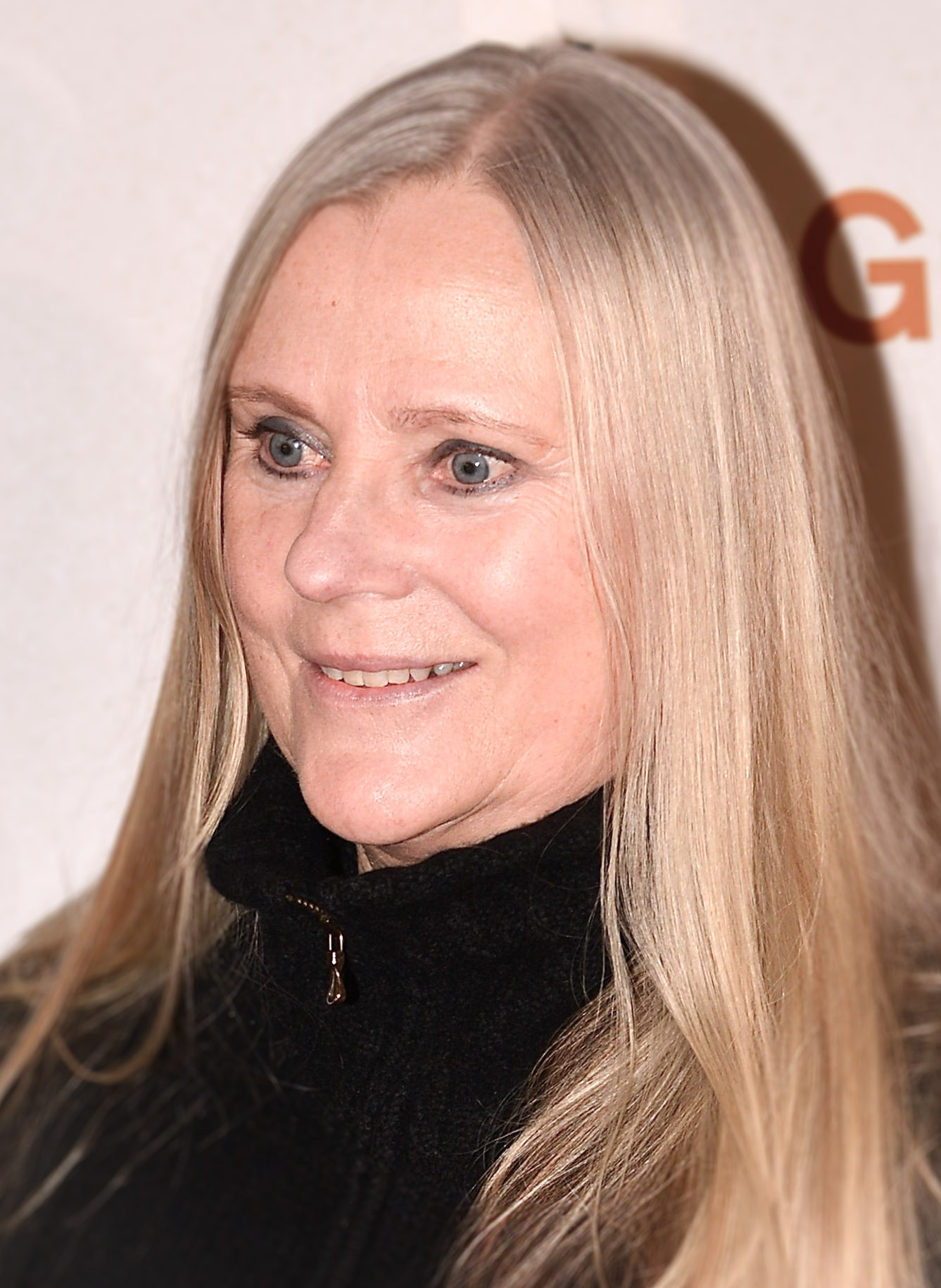
Ulla Skoog, Best Supporting Actress winner

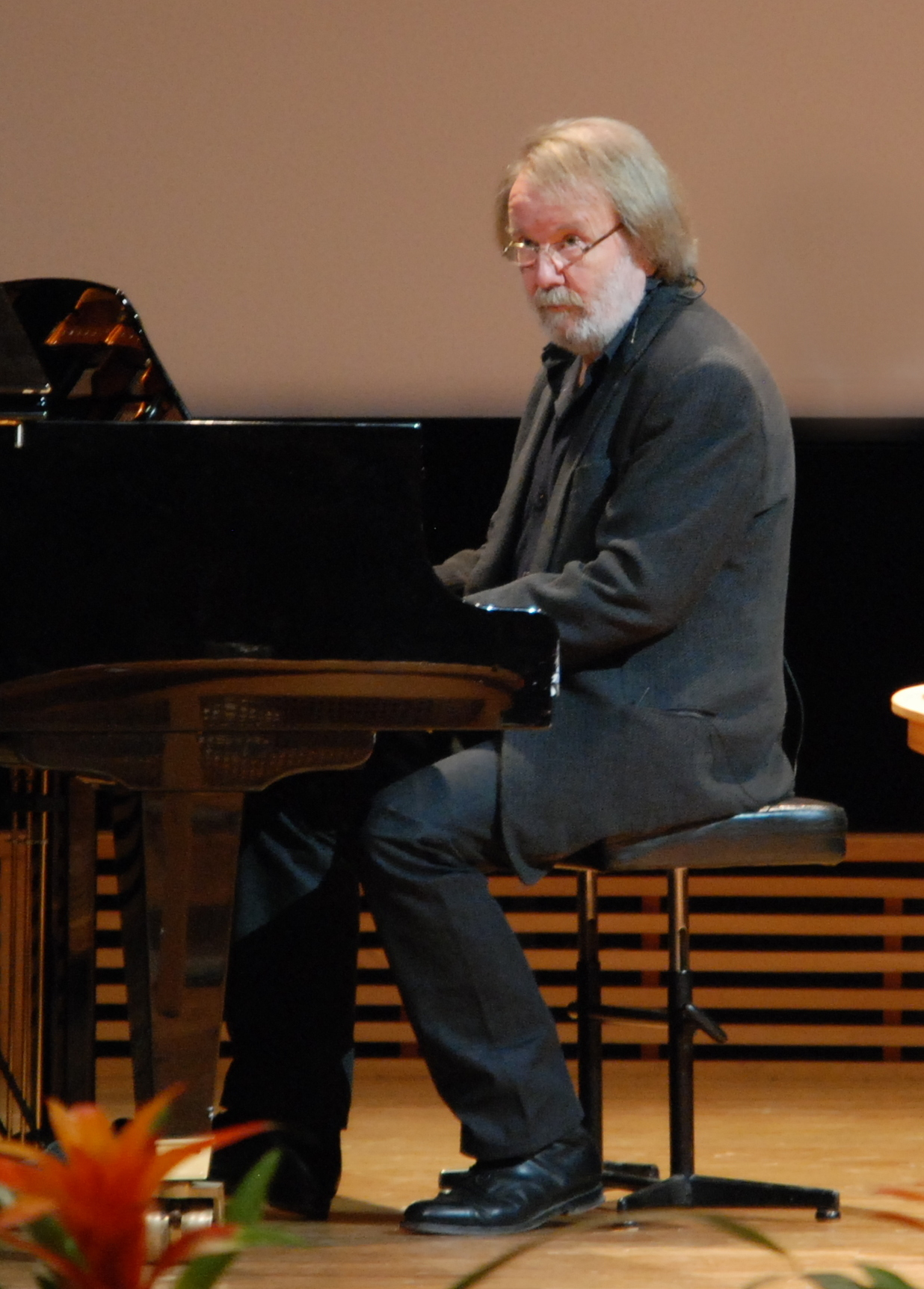
Benny Andersson, Best Original Score winner

Winners are listed first and highlighted in boldface.

| **Best Film**: **Eat Sleep Die – China Åhlander**; Call Girl – Mimmi Spång; Searching for Sugar Man – Malik Bendjelloul, and Simon Chinn | **Best Director**: **Gabriela Pichler – Eat Sleep Die**; Mikael Marcimain – Call Girl; Jan Troell – The Last Sentence |
| **Best Actress in a leading role**: **Nermina Lukac – Eat Sleep Die**; Pernilla August – Call Girl; Linda Molin – Bitch Hug | **Best Actor in a leading role**: **Johannes Brost – Avalon**; Bengt C.W. Carlsson – Lycka till och ta hand om varandra; Matias Varela – Easy Money II: Hard to Kill |
| **Best Supporting Actress**: **Ulla Skoog – The Last Sentence**; Leonore Ekstrand – Avalon; Yohanna Idha – Katinkas kalas | **Best Supporting Actor**: **Peter Carlberg – Avalon**; Milan Dragisic – Eat Sleep Die; Fares Fares – Easy Money II: Hard to Kill |
| **Best Screenplay**: **Gabriela Pichler – Eat Sleep Die**; Malik Bendjelloul – Searching for Sugar Man; Marietta von Hausswolff von Baumgarten – Call Girl | **Best Cinematography**: **Hoyte van Hoytema – Call Girl**; Jan Troell and Mischa Gavrjusjov – The Last Sentence; Måns Månsson – Avalon |
| **Best Documentary Feature**: **Searching for Sugar Man**; Palme; Pojktanten | **Best Shortfilm**: **Dance Music Now**; Fotografen; Gläntan |
| **Best Foreign Film**: **Amour (France)**; Laurence Anyways (Canada); Moonrise Kingdom (United States) | **Best Film Editing**: **Andreas Jonsson, Niels Pagh Andersen and Hanna Lejonqvist – Palme**; Kristofer Nordin – Call Girl; Malik Bendjelloul – Searching for Sugar Man |
| **Best Art Direction**: **Lina Nordqvist – Call Girl**; Sandra Lindgren – Bitchkram; Peter Bävman and Pernilla Olsson – The Last Sentence | **Best Original Score**: **Benny Andersson – Palme**; Malik Bendjelloul and Sixto Rodriguez – Searching for Sugar Man; Andreas Unge and Johan Söderqvist – El Medico - The Cubaton story |
| **Makeup and Hair**: **Jenny Fred – Easy Money II: Hard to Kill**; Eros Codinas – Call Girl; Maria Strid Zackrisson – The Last Sentence | **Best Sound Editing**: **Petter Fladeby and Per Nyström – Call Girl**; Jonas Jansson – Easy Money II: Hard to Kill; Malik Bendjelloul and Per Nyström – Searching for Sugar Man |
| **Best Costume Design**: **Cilla Rörby – Call Girl**; Katja Watkins – The Last Sentence; Jaana Fomin – Mammas pojkar | **Best Visual Effects**: **Andreas Hylander – Isdraken**; Tim Morris – Call Girl; Torbjörn Olsson – Hamilton - I nationens intresse |
| **Gullspiran**: **Ella Lemhagen, director** | **Cinema Audience Award**: **The Anderssons in Greece**; Hamilton - I nationens intresse; Once Upon a Time in Phuket |
**Honorary Award**: **Hans Alfredson, filmmaker and actor**

== Multiple nominations and awards ==
The following films received one or multiple nominations:

- Eleven: Call Girl
- Six: The Last Sentence and Searching for Sugar Man
- Five: Eat Sleep Die
- Four: Avalon and Easy Money II: Hard to Kill
- Three: Palme
- Two: Bitchkram and Hamilton – I nationens intresse
- One: Katinkas kalas, Lycka till och ta hand om varandra, Mammas pojkar, Pojktanten, El Médico – the Cubaton Story, Isdraken, Once Upon a Time in Phuket and Sune i Grekland - All inclusive

The following four films received multiple awards:

- Four: Call Girl and Eat Sleep Die
- Two: Palme and Avalon
