= Martin Wallström =

Swedish television and film actor

- Born: Carl Martin Gunnar Wallström Milkéwitz; 7 July 1983 (age 43); Uddevalla, Sweden
- Education: University of Gothenburg
- Occupation: Actor
- Years active: 1998–present
- Spouse: Lisa Linnertorp (m. 2008; div. 2021)
- Children: 2

Carl Martin Gunnar Wallström Milkéwitz (born 7 July 1983) is a Swedish television and film actor. A successful actor in his home country, he is best known internationally for his 2015 American debut role as Tyrell Wellick in the USA Network cyber-thriller Mr. Robot.

== Early life and education ==
Carl Martin Gunnar Wallström Milkéwitz, known as Carl Wallström, was born on 7 July 1983, in Uddevalla, Sweden.

Wallström began his professional acting career as a teenager, and later decided to study acting. He enrolled in the University of Gothenburg's Academy of Music and Drama in 2004, and graduated in 2008.

== Career ==
Wallström began his career at age fifteen in the Swedish film Hela Härligheten. He has worked in many Swedish, other Nordic, and German television and film productions since 1998.

In 2008, Wallström had a small role in the wide-release Swedish film Arn: The Kingdom at the End of the Road (Arn – Riket vid vägens slut). The following year, he made his debut in the Johan Falk film franchise in the film Johan Falk: GSI – Gruppen för särskilda insatser; he reprised this role in the following Johan Falk film Johan Falk – Vapenbröder which was released the same year.

In 2010, Wallström starred opposite Bill Skarsgård in the Swedish film Simple Simon. The film was recognised internationally and was shortlisted for that year's Academy Award for Best Foreign Language Film. In 2013, he starred in Easy Money III: Life Deluxe, the third instalment of the very successful trilogy starring Joel Kinnaman. He also starred in the Swedish romantic comedy Ego that year.

In October 2014, it was announced that Wallström had joined the main cast of the US television thriller Mr. Robot. This was his US television debut and his most prominent international role to date. Wallström was cast as Tyrell Wellick, an ambitious Swedish technology executive for E Corp that works with the main character Elliot, played by Rami Malek. Wallström won the role of Wellick by submitting three self-tapes to the show. The first episode of the series premiered on 24 June 2015. Although credited as a main cast member for all four seasons of the show, he does not appear on-screen in about one-third of its episodes.

Wallström's other English-language roles include as Martin in the 2014 Swedish film Remake (in both Swedish and English), Tomas in the 2015 internationally co-produced English-language television drama 100 Code, a 2017 voice-acting role in an episode of the Comedy Central show Jeff & Some Aliens, and in supporting roles in the World War II drama Ashes in the Snow and independent science-fiction film Parallel, both released in 2018.

Wallström has narrated many audiobooks in Swedish. As of November 2019, he had narrated 32 books.

== Personal life ==
Wallström married Swedish actress Lisa Linnertorp. They had a son and a daughter together before divorcing in 2021.

Wallström speaks Swedish and English.

== Filmography ==
Year	Film	Role	Notes
1998	Hela Härligheten	Jörgen	
2000	Before the Storm	Danne	
2001	Ingen återvändo	Martin	Short film
2003	Hannah med H	Guy at New Years party #1	
2006	Du & jag	Studenten Jens	
2008	Eldsdansen	Frej	
2008	Arn – Riket vid vägens slut	Magnus Månsköld	
2009	Johan Falk: GSI – Gruppen för särskilda insatser	Martin Borhulth	
2009	Johan Falk – Vapenbröder	Martin Borhulth	
2010	Pure	Mattias	
2010	Sebbe	Tidningstjuv 2	
2010	Pax	Tim	
2010	Simple Simon	Sam	
2011	Beyond the Border	Sven Stenström	
2011	Maria Wern – Drömmar ur snö	Jesper	
2013	Ego	Sebastian	
2013	Easy Money III: Life Deluxe	Martin Hägerström	
2014	Stockholm Stories	Johan	
2014	Remake	Martin	
2015	Nirbashito	Gustav	Indian-Swedish film
2018	Ashes in the Snow	Nikolai Kretzsky	Lithuanian-American film
2018	Videomannen	Chefen	
2019	Parallel	Noel	Directed by Isaac Ezban; Canadian film
2024	Stolen	Robert	

== Television ==
Year	TV Series	Role	Notes
2002	Olivia Twist	Bosse	Mini-series
2002	Familjen	Fred Holde	12 episodes
2003	En ö i havet	Ragnar	Mini-series
2004	Lokalreportern	Robban	Mini-series
2004	Danslärarens åtkomst	Ung Molin	Mini-series
2007	Upp till kamp	Roger	Mini-series
2008	Selma	Nils	Television movie
2009	183 dagar	Bar Customer	1 episode
2009	Kommissarien och havet	Mats Östlund	1 episode; German production
2009	Oskyldigt dömd	Anders Hellman	1 episode
2009	Stenhuggaren	Anders Andersson	Television movie
2005–2010	Wallander	Jens/Johan Rasmusson	2 episodes
2010	Arn	Magnus Månsköld	Mini-series
2010	Drottningoffret	Johnny	Mini-series
2013	Morden i Sandhamn	Magnus	3 episodes
2014	Arvingarna	Matti	1 episode
2015–2019	Mr. Robot	Tyrell Wellick	Main role; American production
2017	Jeff And Some Aliens	Gustav	1 episode; American production
2020	Den Sista Sommaren	Police officer	7 episodes
2020–2023	Beck	Josef Eriksson	12 episodes
2022	Headhunters	Jon Christian Wiklund	6 episodes

== Music videos ==
Year	Artist	Title
2018	In Flames	I Am Above
