= Jon Ekstrand =

Swedish composer and film sound designer

- Born: Jon Petter Ekstrand; 14 December 1976 (age 49); Tumba, Stockholm, Sweden
- Genres: Film score, electronic, ambient
- Instruments: Keyboards, synthesizer, erhu, percussion
- Years active: 2003-present
- Website: www.jonekstrand.com

Jon Petter Ekstrand (born 14 December 1976) is a Swedish composer and film sound designer. As a composer, he has collaborated with director Daniel Espinosa scoring films such as Easy Money, Child 44, Life, and Morbius. Since 1999, he has worked and contributed as a composer or a sound designer on several films, television films, TV series and short films, including music for 4 episodes of the Swedish TV series Sebastian Bergman.

== Career ==
While studying at the Stockholm Film School, Ekstrand was a Tilliander scholar. His first work as a composer was the Danish short film The Fighter (2003) directed by Daniel Espinosa. Since then they have collaborated on several films, including Babylon Disease (2004), Outside Love (2007), Easy Money (2010), Child 44 (2015), Life (2017) and Morbius (2022).

== Filmography ==
=== As composer ===
English language

Year	Title	Director(s)	Notes
2015	Child 44	Daniel Espinosa	Soundtrack released by Lakeshore Records; Fifth collaboration with Espinosa
2017	Life	Daniel Espinosa	Soundtrack released by Milan Records; Sixth collaboration with Espinosa
2018	Slaughterhouse Rulez	Crispin Mills	Soundtrack released by Madison Gate Records; First composition for an English-language film not directed by Espinosa
2020	I Am Greta	Nathan Grossman	Composed with Rebekka Karijord. Soundtrack released by Oona Recordings
2020	Horizon Line	Mikael Marcimain	Composed with Carl-Johan Sevedag. Soundtrack released by Sony Classical; Second composition for an English-language film not directed by Espinosa.
2022	Morbius	Daniel Espinosa	Seventh collaboration with Espinosa. Soundtrack released by Madison Gate Records
2022	All the Old Knives	Janus Metz Pedersen	Composed with Rebekka Karijord. Third composition for an English-language film not directed by Espinosa.

Other languages

Year	Title	Director(s)	Country	Notes
2003	The Fighter	Daniel Espinosa	Denmark	Bokseren (original title); Short film First collaboration with Espinosa
2004	Babylon Disease	Daniel Espinosa	Sweden	Babylonsjukan (original title); Second collaboration with Espinosa
2007	Outside Love	Daniel Espinosa	Denmark	Uden for kærligheden (original title); Third collaboration with Espinosa
2007	Leo	Josef Fares	Sweden	
2008	Bedragaren	Åsa Blanck; Johan Palmgren	Sweden	Composed with Krister Linder; Documentary
2010	Easy Money	Daniel Espinosa	Sweden	Snabba cash (original title); Fourth collaboration with Espinosa
2012	Hamilton: In the Interest of the Nation	Kathrine Windfeld	Sweden	Hamilton: I nationens intresse (original title); Composed with Philippe Boix-Vives
2012	Easy Money II: Hard to Kill	Babak Najafi	Sweden	Snabba cash II (original title)
2012	Agent Hamilton: But Not If It Concerns Your Daughter	Tobias Falk	Sweden	Hamilton: Men inte om det gäller din dotter (original title)
2013	Easy Money III: Life Deluxe	Jens Jonsson	Sweden	Snabba cash - Livet deluxe (original title)
2017	Borg vs McEnroe	Janus Metz Pedersen	Sweden	
2017	Blind Alley	Manuel Concha	Sweden	
2018	Jimmie	Jesper Ganslandt	Sweden	
2019	Queen of Hearts	May el-Toukhy	Denmark	Dronningen (original title)
2024	The Helicopter Heist	Daniel Espinosa	Sweden	Published by IIP-DDS

Television

Year	Title	Studio	Notes
2010–2013	Sebastian Bergman	SVT1	Den fördömde (original title); Composed with Philippe Boix-Vives
2017—2019	Alex	Viaplay	Composed with Carl-Johan Sevedag
2017—present	Farang	C More Entertainment	Composed with Anders Niska and Klas Wahl
