= Snabba Cash (TV series) =

2021 Swedish crime television series

- Swedish: Snabba cash
- Genre: Action; Crime; Drama
- Starring: Evin Ahmad; Alexander Abdallah; Ayaan Ahmed
- Opening theme: "Försent"
- Composer: 1.Cuz feat. Greekazo
- Country of origin: Sweden
- Original language: Swedish
- No. of seasons: 2
- No. of episodes: 12

Production
- Production locations: Stockholm, Sweden
- Running time: 44 minutes
- Production company: SF Studios

Original release
- Network: Netflix
- Release: 7 April 2021 – 22 September 2022

Snabba Cash is a 2021 Swedish television series written by Jens Lapidus and Oskar Söderlund (screenwriter) and directed by Jesper Ganslandt. It is based on Lapidus' Stockholm Noir novel trilogy, the first of which was adapted into three films: Easy Money (2010), Easy Money II: Hard to Kill (2012), and Easy Money III: Life Deluxe (2013). The series takes place in Stockholm, ten years after the events of the film trilogy.

In June 2021, a second season was announced and was released in September 2022.

== Synopsis ==
In Season 1, Leya (Evin Ahmad), a single mother of Middle Eastern ancestry, is desperate for startup funding for an artificial intelligence firm she founded. Leya, like many others in the mostly immigrant housing developments where she resides, has few alternatives. She believes her only option is to borrow money from her drug-dealing brother-in-law Ravy (Dada Fungula Bozela), which jeopardises her future when he becomes a partner in her company.

Season 2 takes place one year later. Leya is pushing her startup towards a public offering while Ravy battles a ruthless new competitor for control of the drug trade. Leya's connections with the underworld continue to threaten her successful business career.

== Cast ==
- Evin Ahmad as Leya
- Alexander Abdallah as Salim
- Ayan Ahmed [] as Nala
- Ali Alarik as Tim
- Dada Fungula Bozela as Ravy
- Olle Sarri as Thomas Storm
- Nadja Christiansson as Ronja
- Egon Ebbersten as Martin Wallin
- Peter Eggers as Marcus Werner
- Love Ehn as Leon
- Jozef Wojciechowicz as Dani
- Alex Moore Eklund as Barre
- Yussra El Abdouni as Fatima
- Fredrik Evers as Tim's Father
- Yasmine Garbi as Li
- Khalil Ghazal as Osman
- Felice Jankell as Viktoria
- Ardalan Esmaili as Jamal

== Episodes ==
Episodes for seasons 1 and 2

No. overall	No. in season	Title	Directed by	Written by	Original release date
1	1	"Shuno Is 12 Percent"	Jesper Ganslandt	Unknown	7 April 2021
2	2	"Gonna Be 2 Rocks, Leya"	Jesper Ganslandt	Unknown	7 April 2021
3	3	"Friends and Family"	Jesper Ganslandt	Unknown	7 April 2021
4	4	"Was Never 'Bout the Cheese, Things Just Happened This Way"	Jesper Ganslandt	Unknown	7 April 2021
5	5	"If You Play with Fire, You're Gonna Get Burned"	Jesper Ganslandt	Unknown	7 April 2021
6	6	"Making Money Is Never Bad!"	Jesper Ganslandt	Unknown	7 April 2021
7	1	"It Was Dag Hammarskjöld, Fam"	Jesper Ganslandt	Jesper Ganslandt, Oskar Söderlund	22 September 2022
8	2	"Are They Chatting or Selling?"	Jesper Ganslandt	Jesper Ganslandt, Aron Levander, Oskar Söderlund	22 September 2022
9	3	"We'll Try One with You"	Måns Månsson	Jesper Ganslandt, Oskar Söderlund	22 September 2022
10	4	"Waste Them All"	Måns Månsson	Jesper Ganslandt, Mona Masri, Oskar Söderlund	22 September 2022
11	5	"Yeah, 100%. This Is the Last Last Time"	Lisa Farzaneh	Jesper Ganslandt, Oskar Söderlund	22 September 2022
12	6	"I Know Who You Are"	Lisa Farzaneh	Jesper Ganslandt, Oskar Söderlund	22 September 2022

== Reception ==
In his review for Wall Street Journal, John Anderson describe the series as The show's insular worlds collide, revealing complex relationships and impending doom. Once established, the series becomes engrossing, exploring desperation's influence on actions. New York Times Tobias Grey praised the show's creator, Oskar Soderlund, for highlighting the extreme versions of capitalism represented in these worlds, as how's adaptation of Jens Lapidus's novels modernizes crime in Stockholm, emphasizing the growth of organized crime and its brutality.
