= Joel Spira =

Swedish actor (born 1981)

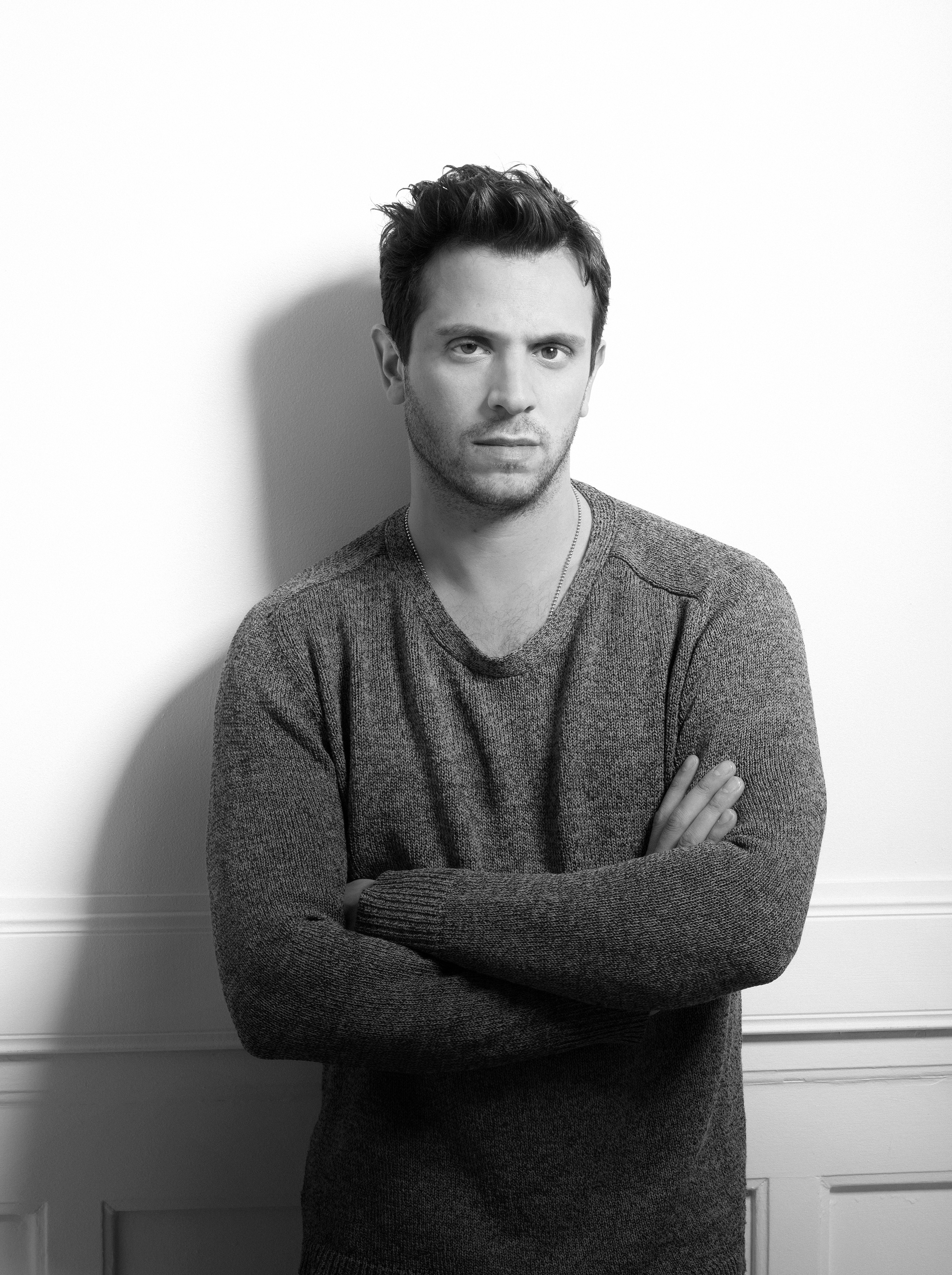
- Spira in 2014
- Born: 1981 (age 44–45); Stockholm, Sweden
- Education: Malmö Theatre Academy
- Occupation: Actor
- Years active: 2005–present

Joel Boris Spira (born 1981) is a Swedish film, television, and theatre actor.

== Early life and education ==
He was born in 1981 in Stockholm, Sweden.

While studying biology at the Stockholm University, Spira decided to give acting a chance.

He graduated from the Malmö Theatre Academy in 2007.

== Career ==
=== Theatre ===
Since graduating from Malmö Theatre Academy, Spira has appeared in several plays. He played Mowgli in Rudyard Kiplings The Jungle Book at Länsteatern in Västerås, Sweden. He later appeared in Lejonets unge at Länsteaten in Örebro. Since 2009, he has been part of the cast of The Brothers Lionheart at the Stockholm City Theatre where he plays the secondary lead character Jonathan.

=== Film ===
Spira made his movie debut in the 2009 short film Travemünde Trelleborg. His first appearance in a feature film was in the 2010 movie Snabba cash (English translation "Easy Money") by Swedish director Daniel Espinosa, based on the 2006 book of the same name by author Jens Lapidus.

=== Television ===
Spira appeared in the SVT produced Children's television series Barda in 2007. He also appeared in the SVT series Anno 1790 as one of the main characters. In 2013 he appeared in Crimes of Passion.

Spira starred in the three seasons of the drama Thicker Than Water (Tjockare än vatten) in 2014, 2016 and 2020, alongside Björn Bengtsson, Aliette Opheim and Jessica Grabowsky.
