= Easy Money III: Life Deluxe =

- Easy Money III- Life Deluxe poster.jpg
- Swedish: Snabba Cash: Livet Deluxe
- Directed by: Jens Jonsson
- Written by: Maria Karlsson; Jens Jonsson
- Based on: Livet Deluxe by Jens Lapidus
- Produced by: Fredrik Wikström Nicastro
- Starring: Matias Varela; Joel Kinnaman
- Cinematography: Askild Vik Edvardsen
- Music by: Jon Ekstrand
- Production company: Tre Vänner Produktion AB
- Distributed by: Nordisk Film AB
- Release date: 30 August 2013
- Running time: 127 minutes
- Country: Sweden
- Languages: Swedish, Spanish, Serbian, English

Easy Money III: Life Deluxe (Swedish: Snabba Cash: Livet Deluxe) is a 2013 Swedish thriller film directed by Jens Jonsson, based on the novel Livet Deluxe by Jens Lapidus. The film is the third and final installment in the Easy Money film trilogy, following Easy Money and Easy Money II: Hard to Kill. Matias Varela and Joel Kinnaman reprise their roles as career criminal Jorge and business student turned convict JW, respectively, alongside returning cast members Dejan Čukić and Madeleine Martin and series newcomers Martin Wallström and Malin Buska. Set after the events of the second film, Easy Money III: Life Deluxe continues the stories of Jorge, JW, and the Serbian mob as their paths intertwine through their criminal activities.

== Plot ==
Now living in the United States, JW continues his search to uncover the fate of his missing sister Camilla. Through his personal investigation, he learns she became involved with Serbian mob boss Radovan as an exotic dancer and mistress. When Radovan found out that Camilla was planning to leave, he had his second-in-command Stefanovic kill her to set an example for the other dancers.

Back in Sweden, Radovan survives an assassination attempt. To protect his only surviving child Natalie, he assigns subordinate Martin to watch over her. Unknown to Radovan, Martin is an undercover officer assigned to bring him to justice. Martin has been able to infiltrate the mob with information provided by the incarcerated Jorge, who is released early for his cooperation and sent to work at a nursing home. Jorge learns that Nadja, the former sex slave he became close with, is also working at the nursing home and the two start a relationship. While Nadja intends to stay out of criminal activities, Jorge is secretly planning a large robbery for Swedish mob boss Finnen that he believes will allow him to retire.

The robbery is successful, but Jorge and his men are double-crossed by Finnen. Only Jorge survives and manages to retrieve a bag of money, which he uses to escape to Mexico. He contacts Nadja, who reveals that she is pregnant. While Martin and Natalie become romantically involved, Radovan realizes Martin is a police officer, but is killed by a car bomb before he can take action. Natalie is led to believe the assassination was orchestrated by Stefanovic and attempts to kill him. Although her attempt fails, Martin saves her and kills Stefanovic, leaving Natalie as the mob's leader.

When Jorge calls Nadja again, he learns she has been kidnapped by Finnen and will only be released in exchange for the remaining money. He contacts Martin for assistance in saving Nadja and the two meet with Finnen and his men for the exchange. Martin manages to rescue Nadja, while Jorge engages in a gunfight with Finnen and is seemingly killed in an explosion. Natalie uncovers Martin's status as an undercover officer and confronts him with this information when he returns, but gives him the opportunity to escape. She then learns that her father's assassination was orchestrated by JW in retaliation for Camilla's murder. With this knowledge, Natalie tracks down JW and personally executes him.

Two weeks after Jorge's apparent death, Nadja learns he is still alive, having faked his death after killing Finnen and his men and retrieving the money. In a letter, Jorge explains that he was waiting for the right time to tell her the truth and extends an offer for her to live with him at his new home in Mexico. Nadja accepts and reunites with Jorge.

== Cast ==
- Matias Varela as Jorge
- Joel Kinnaman as JW
- Martin Wallström as Martin Hägerström
- Malin Buska as Natalie Krajnic
- Dejan Čukić as Radovan
- Madeleine Martin as Nadja
- Cedomir Djordjevic as Stefanovic
- Saša Petrović as Dragan
- Mats Andersson as Finnen
- Pablo Leiva Wenger as Pablo
- Hugo Ruiz as Sergio
- Maja Christenson Kin as Camilla Westlund
- Hamdija Causevic as Goran
- Claudio Oyarzo as Ramon
- Victor Gadderus as Ivan Hasdic
- Gerhard Hoberstorfer as Torsfjäll
- Kalled Mustonen as David
- Aliette Opheim as Lollo
- Ida Idili Jonsson as Anna/Candy
- Iwar Wiklander as Police colleague
