= Dejan Cukic =

Dejan Cukic may refer to:

- Dejan Cukić, Serbian and Yugoslav musician, journalist, author and translator
- Dejan Čukić, Danish/Montenegrin actor
