= Claudio Oyarzo =

- Born: 5 November 1979 (age 46)
- Genres: Alternative rock, alternative metal, progressive rock, melodic death metal, hardcore, death metal, nu metal
- Occupation: Musician
- Instruments: Guitar, bass, drums
- Years active: 1994–present
- Labels: Razzia/Razzia Notes, Dead Tree Music, earMUSIC, Putrid Filth Conspiracy

Claudio Andres Oyarzo Muñoz (born 5 November 1979) is a Swedish metal musician and youtuber. He currently lives in Gothenburg and played guitar with the melodic rock act Minora from Gothenburg and the bass with the Gothenburg-Stockholm metal band The Resistance. He played as a session member for a few months before he was asked to join the band, which happened during the video recording of the first single from the album Scars, called "Clearing the Slate".

The Resistance is mostly known as a Swedish death metal supergroup containing Jesper Strömblad (Ex. In flames), Glenn Ljungström (Ex. In Flames) and Marco Aro (The Haunted).

12 June 2020, Claudio along with Jennie Nord(Ex. Rave the Reqviem) created the band Aligned. 8 Mars 2023 Claudio along with Jonathan Thorpenberg, Hjalmar Almgren and Adam Ekholm created the band Vemød.

He is also known for his role as Ramon in the Swedish film Snabba Cash – Livet Deluxe, where he plays a robber together with Matias Varela, Joel Kinnaman among others. He also has a YouTube channel.

== Appearances ==
=== Aligned ===
- Remnants (2022, Album)
- Elysian (2025, Singel)
- Control (2025, Singel)
- Alone (2025, Singel)
- Fortress (2025, Singel)
- The Chase (2026, Singel)

=== Vemød ===
- Demons Within (2023, EP)
- Demons Within (Instrumental) (2023, Singel)
- Matriarch (Instrumental) (2023, Singel)
- Broken Clown (Instrumental) (2024, Singel)
- The Depths (Instrumental) (2024, Singel)
- Save Me (2025, Singel)
- Come Undone (2025, Singel)
- The Cynic (2025, Singel)
- Burden (2025, EP)
- Save Me (Instrumental) (2025, Singel)
- Come Undone (2025, Singel)
- The Cynic (2025, Singel)
- Burden (2025, Singel)
- Take Cover (2025, Singel) Collab with Markus Björnli and August Tapojärvi)

=== The Resistance ===
- Scars (2013) (Guitar solo on I Bend You Break and Your Demise)

=== Minora ===
- Imago (2011)
- Into the Ocean (2013, EP)

=== Movies ===
- Snabba Cash Livet Deluxe (2013)
