= Portent =

Portent may refer to:

- Portent (divination), a phenomenon that is believed to foretell the future, also known as an omen or presage
- The Portent, a comic book
- USS Portent (AM-106), an Auk-class minesweeper
