= Babak Najafi =

Iranian-Swedish film director (born 1975)

- بابک نجفی
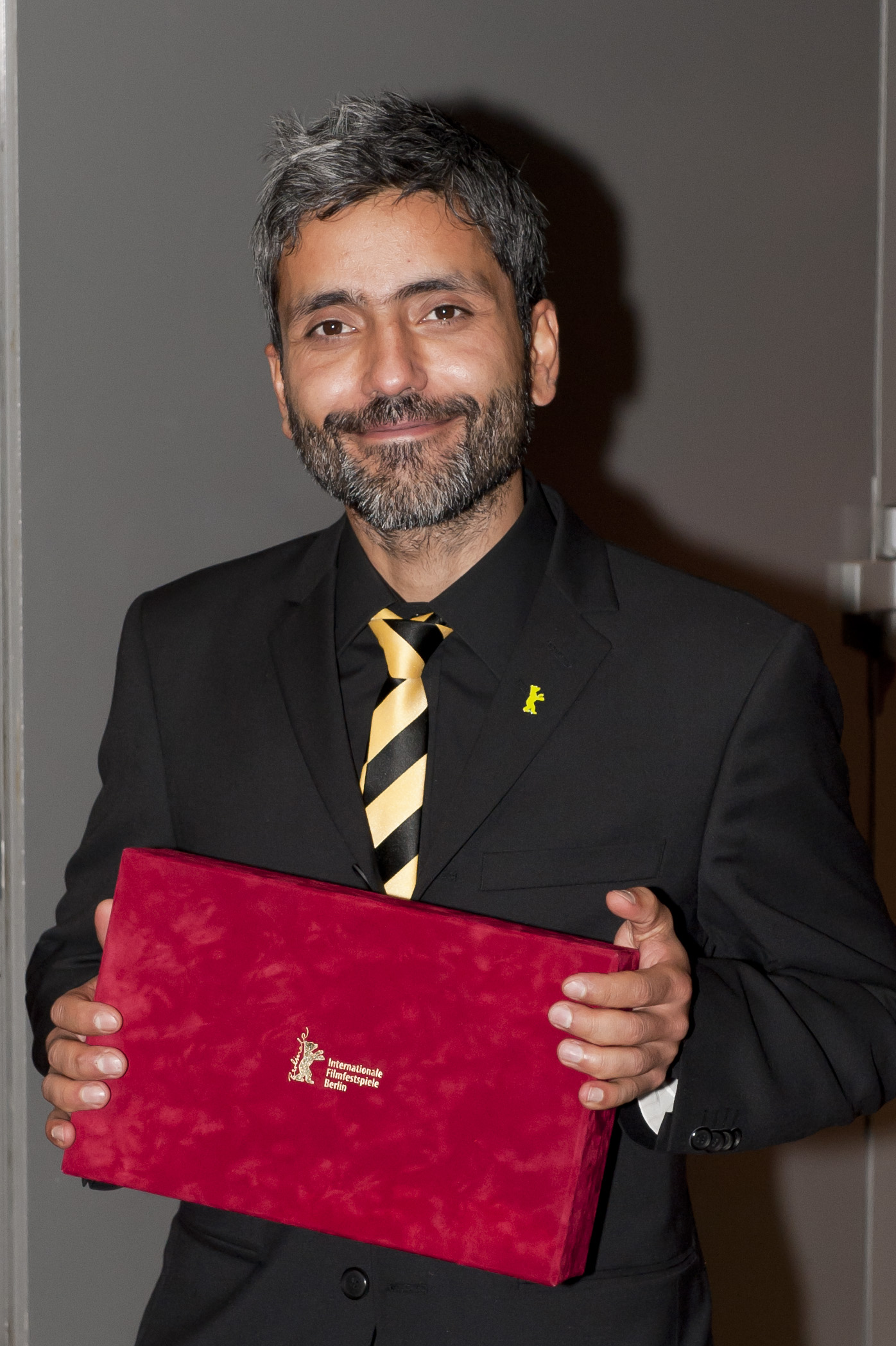
- Babak Najafi at the 60th Berlin International Film Festival, 2010.
- Born: Babak Najafi Karami; 14 September 1975 (age 51); Imperial State of Iran
- Occupations: Film director, screenwriter

Babak Najafi Karami (Persian: بابک نجفی, born 14 September 1975) is an Iranian-Swedish film director, screenwriter, and cinematographer. He is known for directing the 2016 film London Has Fallen.

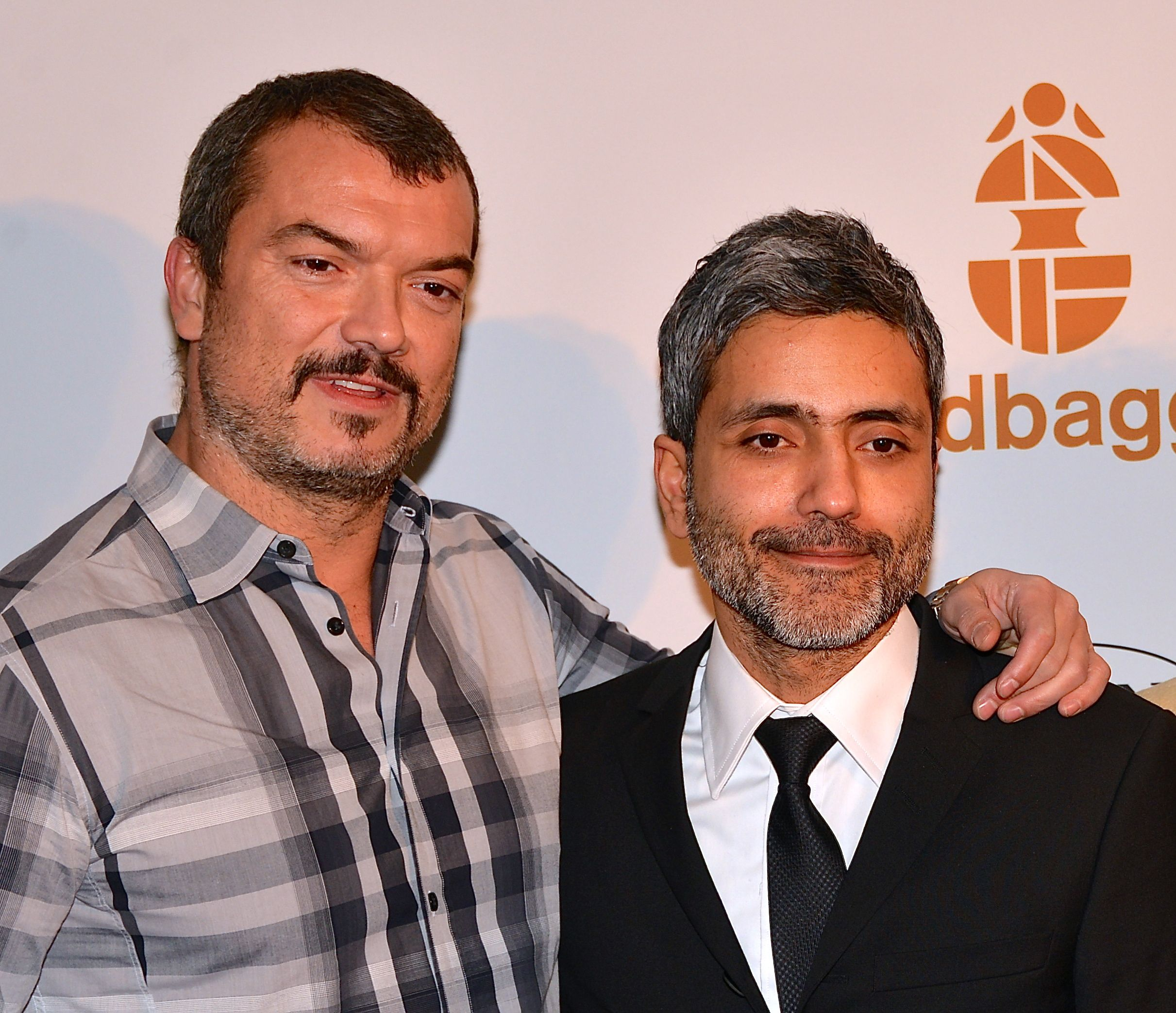
Dragomir Mrsic and Babak Najafi at the 48th Guldbagge Awards.

== Early years ==
Najafi was born in Iran, and came to Sweden as a refugee at the age of 11, when his family fled from the Iran–Iraq War. Two of his brothers remained in Tehran, and it took 11 years before they met again. The family settled in Uppsala, where he spent his childhood. Between 1998 and 2002, he studied documentary directing at the Dramatiska Institutet.

== Career ==
After graduation he wrote and directed a number of acclaimed short films, including the short film comedy Elixir (2004), which he was awarded the Bo Widerberg scholarship. In 2010, he made his directorial debut with the film Sebbe, which won a Guldbagge Award for Best Film, and earned him a nomination as best director at the 46th Guldbagge Awards. At the 60th Berlin International Film Festival, the film was competing in the Generation 14Plus category, for which Najafi won the award for Best First Feature. In 2012, he directed Easy Money II: Hard to Kill, the sequel to the 2010 film Easy Money.

Najafi made his English-language film debut with London Has Fallen (2016), the sequel to the 2013 film Olympus Has Fallen. The film was released to mostly negative reviews, but earned 205.8 million against a 60 million budget.

Babak Najafi== Filmography == Short film

Year	Title	Director	Writer	Notes
1999	Rasten	Yes	No	
2001	Gösta & Lennart	Yes	No	Also producer
2002	Pablos födelsedag	Yes	Yes	
2004	Elixir	Yes	Yes	
2008	Jag förstår inte	Yes	Yes	Also cinematographer
2015	Pojkarna	No	Yes	

Feature film

Year	Title	Director	Writer	DoP
2010	Sebbe	Yes	Yes	No
2012	Easy Money II: Hard to Kill	Yes	Yes	No
2013	Gabriel och lasermannen	Yes	Yes	Yes
2016	London Has Fallen	Yes	No	No
2018	Proud Mary	Yes	No	No
2026	The Florist	Yes	No	No
