= Tre Vänner =

Swedish production company

Tre Vänner Produktion AB (literally: Three Friends) was a Swedish production company founded in 1995 by the screenwriters Michael Hjorth, Johan Kindblom, and Tomas Tivemark. It made television programs, movies and commercials. They created the series Svensson, Svensson, Cleo, and Mannen som log. The company also produced several television episodes of several TV series, such as Världarnas bok, Poliser, and Ett gott parti, the films 7 miljonärer, Ett öga rött, Kid Svensk, and the series Det okända.

Tre Vänner also produced the 2010 film Easy Money (original name: Snabba cash), which is an adaptation of Jens Lapidus' novel with the same name. They have also made advertisements for the grocery chain ICA and Swedbank. In addition, the company has also created a wholly owned production company, along with Camilla Läckberg, producing ten 1.5-hour-long TV episodes named Fjällbackamorden.

In 2013, the company was bought by Svensk Filmindustri, and later merged to create the new studio SF Studios in 2016.
