= Matias Varela =

Swedish actor

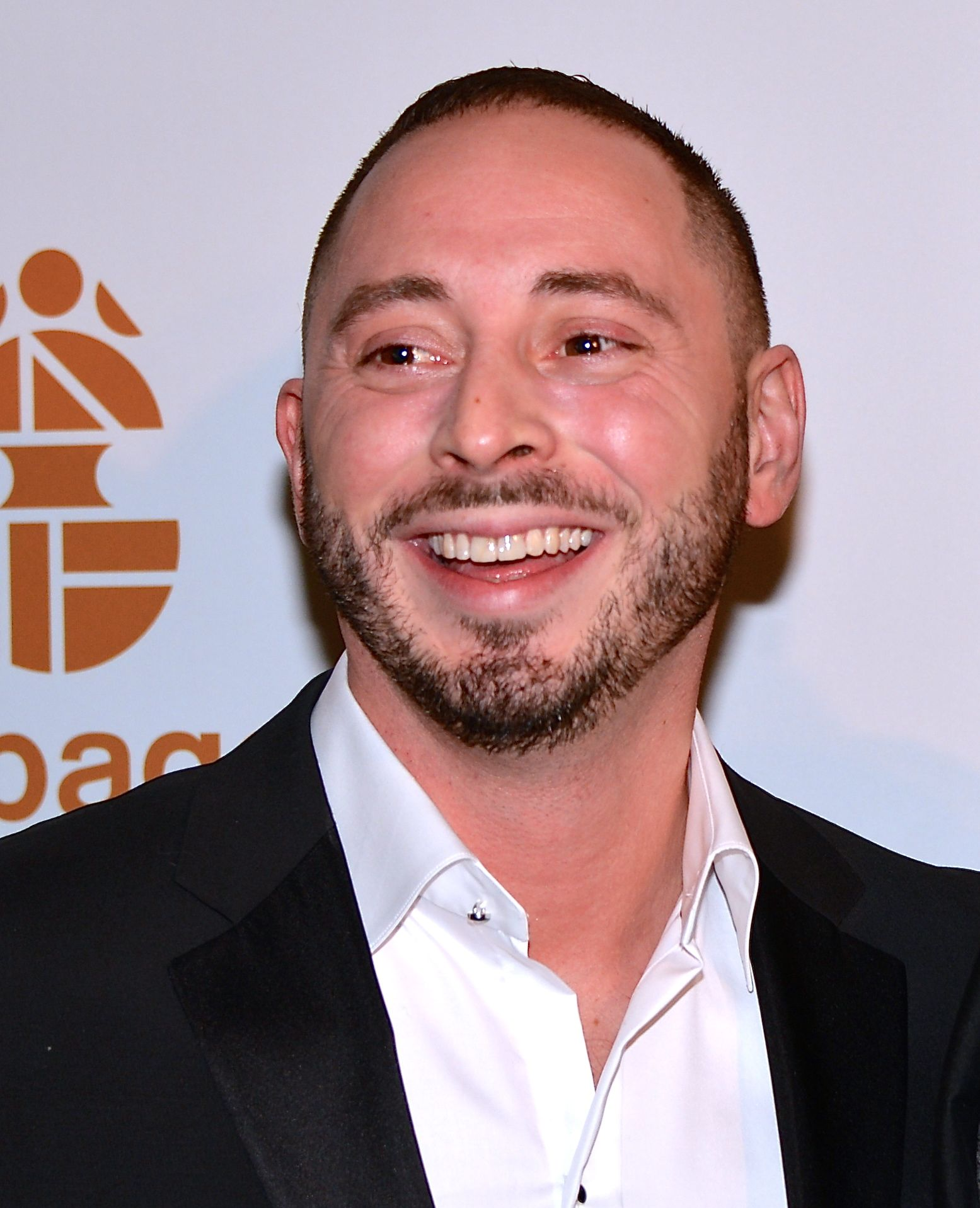
- Varela on 21 January 2013
- Born: Louis Matias Karl Padin Varela; 23 June 1980 (age 46); Stockholm, Sweden
- Other name: Louis Matias Padin Varela
- Occupation: Actor
- Years active: 2000–present
- Height: 1.79 m (5 ft 10 1/2 in)

Louis Matias Karl Padin Varela (born 23 June 1980) is a Swedish actor.

== Early life ==
Varela was born and grew up in Södermalm on the south side of Stockholm. Both of his parents are from Cambados, Galicia and he did not learn Swedish until he started school. During middle school, he became friends with Gustaf Skarsgård, son of actor Stellan Skarsgård. Varela did not then know of the famous Skarsgård family because he mostly watched Spanish satellite television. When his friend Skarsgård applied to a selective upper secondary school, Södra Latin's drama program near where both boys lived, Varela wanted to do the same. The elder Skarsgård gave the young Varela a few hours of acting instructions and he was accepted by the school. Varela said he was surprised, because he had shown up in a track suit and looked more like a "chav" than an aspiring actor.

== Career ==
After a brief appearance in the soap opera Nya tider, he left Sweden for a while and on returning worked as a construction worker with small acting jobs for a sideline. After reading the bestselling Swedish crime novel Snabba Cash and hearing that a film production company Tre Vänner was adapting the book for the big screen he set his sights on starring as the Swedish-Chilean drug dealer Jorge Salinas. Varela convinced the director Daniel Espinosa to give him a screen test. Espinosa, who himself is of Chilean descent, had stated he wanted someone with roots in Chile, and Varela would eventually land the role.

Easy Money was a success and Varela went on to star in both sequels: Easy Money II: Hard to Kill (2012) and Easy Money III: Life Deluxe (2013). He also got the part of Police Detective Jorge Chavez in the big budget TV series Arne Dahl. In series 2 Alexander Salzberger replaced him.

Varela had his first international role in an episode of Covert Affairs as a Basque terrorist. In 2013 he was in several episodes of Showtime's The Borgias in the prominent part of Ferdinand II of Naples.

Among his projects in 2015 and 2016 were Johan Renck's quirky crime drama Ettor och nollor alongside his old friend Gustaf Skarsgård, the 2015 remake Point Break, and the video game adaptation Assassin's Creed, with Michael Fassbender.

In 2017, he starred as Jorge Salcedo Cabrera, the head of security for the Cali Cartel in season three of the Netflix series Narcos. In 2020, he reprised the role in the second season of Narcos: Mexico.

In 2019 he co-starred again with Gustaf Skarsgård in 438 dagar (438 Days) based on the true story of two Swedish journalists who spent over year in an Ethiopian prison; Fartblinda (2019, 2022), a Swedish TV series set in the world of finance; and American independent film Heavy.

In 2020, he starred in HBO Max's Raised by Wolves by director Ridley Scott and Scott Free Productions.

In 2025, he has a supporting role in the romantic comedy feature The Dance Club.

== Personal life ==
He is fluent in Swedish, Spanish, Galician, and English.
