= Palme (film) =

- Theatrical release poster
- Directed by: Maud Nycander; Kristina Lindström
- Written by: Maud Nycander; Kristina Lindström
- Produced by: Fredrik Heinig; Mattias Nohrborg
- Cinematography: Magnus Berg; Anders Bohman
- Edited by: Andreas Jonsson Hay; Hanna Lejonqvist; Niels Pagh Andersen
- Music by: Benny Andersson
- Production companies: B-Reel Feature Films; SVT; Film i Väst
- Distributed by: Scanbox (cinema Sweden)
- Release dates: September 14, 2012 (Sweden); November 9, 2012 (Finland)
- Running time: 103 minutes (cinema); 175 minutes (TV)
- Country: Sweden
- Language: Swedish

Palme is a Swedish documentary film from 2012 directed, and written by Maud Nycander and Kristina Lindström. The film is a biographical portrait of the former Prime Minister Olof Palme, and covers his life from childhood to the role as a leading figure of Swedish politics.

It has been shown as a 103 minutes long feature film in the cinemas, and as a 175 minutes long TV-movie in three parts on SVT at Christmas and New Year the same year. At the 48th Guldbagge Awards, the film was nominated in three categories: Best Documentary Feature (Maud Nycander and Kristina Lindström), Best Editing (Andreas Jonsson, Hanna Lejonqvist and Niels Pagh Andersen) and Best Original Score (Benny Andersson). It won in the latter two categories.

== Synopsis ==
On Friday evening, February 28, 1986 Olof Palme was shot dead in the street. The day after, the news reached out to the people that the country's prime minister was dead, and the whole country found itself suddenly shocked.

In the film one can follow Palme's life from youth until he is murdered. His long career in the Swedish Social Democratic Party is also shown. Other subjects that the film also treats are more controversial topics, for example the situation with the IB affair. The film focuses on the person Olof Palme, as in almost 26 years has been overshadowed by his sudden death. It contains material from the Palmes family that has never been shown in public, private snapshots and family movies.

== Cast (in selection) ==
- Olof Palme
- Tage Erlander
- Lisbeth Palme
- Fidel Castro
- Thorbjörn Fälldin
- Ulf Adelsohn
- Gösta Bohman
- Ingvar Carlsson
- Kjell-Olof Feldt
- Anders Ferm
- Lennart Geijer
- Mona Sahlin
- Carl Bildt
- Harry Schein
- Ingmar Bergman
- Roy Andersson
- Desmond Tutu
- Anna Lindh
- Henry Kissinger
- Astrid Lindgren
- Tage Danielsson
- Mattias Palme
- Mårten Palme
- Joakim Palme
- Vilgot Sjöman
- Kristina Lindström - Narrator
