= Dragomir Mrsic =

Swedish actor

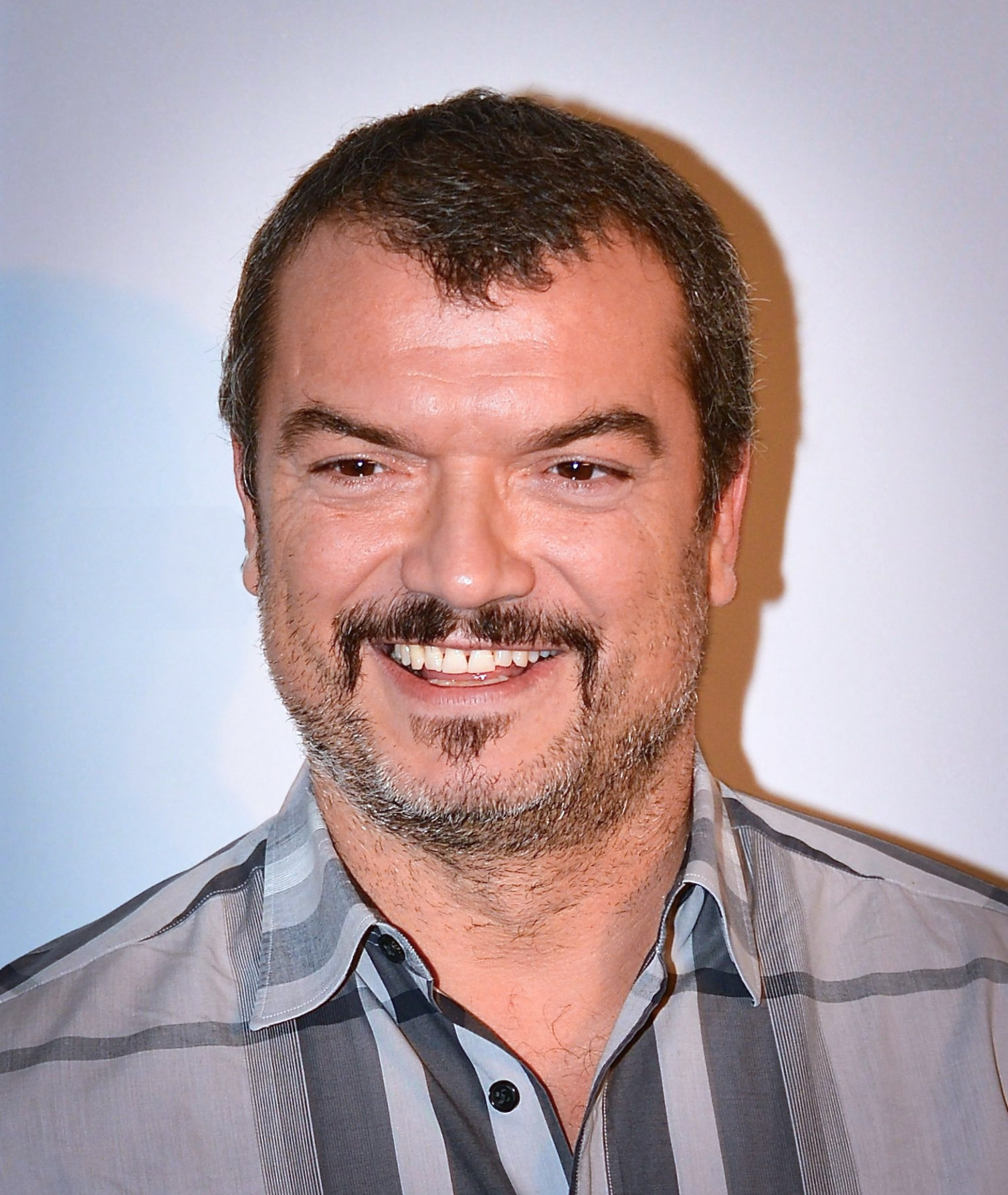
- Dragomir Mrsic at the 48th Guldbagge Awards.
- Born: 2 October 1969 (age 56); Prijedor, SR Bosnia and Herzegovina, Yugoslavia
- Occupations: Actor, sports consultant, sports leader

Dragomir Mrsic (born 2 October 1969), nicknamed Gago is a Serbian-Swedish actor, sports consultant and sports leader.

== Life and career ==
Mrsic was born in the Rasavci village near Prijedor, SR Bosnia and Herzegovina, Yugoslavia, to father Momir and mother Radojka. His father got a job in Sweden in the late 1960s. Dragomir moved with his mother and two older siblings to Sweden aged a month and a half, and was brought up in Fittja, a suburb of southern Stockholm. His father worked as a chef at Grand Hôtel in the city, his mother as a cleaner at the local school. His father was a functioning alcoholic. At 14 years of age he witnessed his brother's friend's suicide by jumping. His two siblings, sister Ranka and brother Radomir "Rajko", died due to drug usage.

He has been trained in Taekwondo since his youth, and has a black belt. His childhood idol was Bruce Lee. At 18 years of age, in 1987, he became the Nordic Champion in taekwondo. In 1990, he and his friend Liam Norberg were involved in the robbery of bank Götabanken; he stood guard some hundred meters away. He was arrested and sentenced to three years and six months in prison for the robbery, and served his sentence at Hall Prison. He studied Buddhism in prison. After serving his sentence, he entered into a sports college. He then started a gym, and became a sports consultant. He was a top program trainer in the Swedish Olympics Committee from 2000 to 2004.

After a few minor acting roles, such as in the Wallander film Kuriren (2009), he got his big break out in 2010 as Mrado, in the critically acclaimed film Easy Money (2010).

In 2014, he co-starred in the Tom Cruise film, Edge of Tomorrow.

In January 2015, he gave his voice and likeness to Dragan in the video game Payday 2. Mrsic is the only cast member in the game who has previously been involved in illegal activities.

In his gym, "Extreme Training", he has trained sportspeople such as Martina Navratilova, Helen Alfredsson and Douglas Murray and actors such as Rooney Mara.

He also starred in Stjärnorna på slottet in seasons 2019/2020.

Mrsic lives with the personal trainer Isabel Alonso. They met in 1992 and have a daughter and a son.

== Filmography ==
=== Movies ===
Year	Film	Role	Notes
2006	Exit	Extra	
2007	Gangster	Dragan	
2007	Leo	Gago	
2009	Wallander – Kuriren	Jovan	
2010	Easy Money	Mrado Slovovic	
2012	Easy Money II: Hard to Kill	Mrado Slovovic	
2014	Edge of Tomorrow	Kuntz	
2021	Omerta 6/12	Zlatko	Post-production

=== TV-series ===
Year	Film	Role	Notes
2014	Torpederna		
2017	Innan vi dör		
2017	Torpederna		
2017	Syrror		
2017-2019	Alex	Alex Leko	
2018	Bonusfamiljen	Branco	
2018	West of Liberty	Pavel	
2018	Bullets	Juri Borodin	

=== Video games ===
Year	Title	Role	Notes
2014	Payday 2	Dragan	Heister
2018	A Way Out	Prison Brute Hitman	The one that was big and bald.

== Writing ==
- Dragomir Mrsic & Majsan Boström; Extreme Training: from Fittja to Hollywood, Fitnessförlaget, 2014. ISBN 91-7363-062-4

== Annotations ==
1. His name in his native Serbian is rendered Dragomir Mrsić (Драгомир Мрсић) or Dragomir Mršić (Драгомир Мршић).
