= Wahlström & Widstrand =

Swedish publishing house

- Parent company: Bonnier
- Founded: 1885
- Founder: Per Karl Wahlström and Wilhelm Widstrand
- Country of origin: Sweden
- Headquarters location: Stockholm
- Publication types: Books
- Official website: www.wwd.se

Wahlström & Widstrand is a Swedish book publishing company.

Wahlström & Widstrand was established in 1885 by two book sellers in Stockholm, Per Karl Wahlström and Wilhelm Widstrand. The company started publishing fiction in the 1890s and later also published non-fiction works, especially historical biographies. Foreign authors introduced by Wahlström & Widstrand to Swedish readers in the first half of the 20th century include Hermann Hesse, Thomas Mann, Joseph Conrad, Maxim Gorky and Henri Bergson as well as later authors such as Franz Kafka in the 1940s, William Styron in the 1950s and Joseph Heller in the 1960s.

Numerous acclaimed Swedish writers have been discovered by the publishing house of Wahlström & Widstrand, and it has also published several Nobel Prize winners such as Aleksandr Solzhenitsyn, Gabriel García Márquez, Derek Walcott, Wole Soyinka, Joseph Brodsky, José Saramago, V. S. Naipaul and Herta Müller. Swedish writers published by the company include Per Wästberg, Tage Danielsson, Ulf Lundell, Lukas Moodysson, Jens Lapidus and Johan Theorin. Wahlström & Widstrand is now part of the Bonnier Books division of Bonnier group of Scandinavian publishing houses.
