= Jens Lapidus =

Swedish crime writer and lawyer (born 1974)

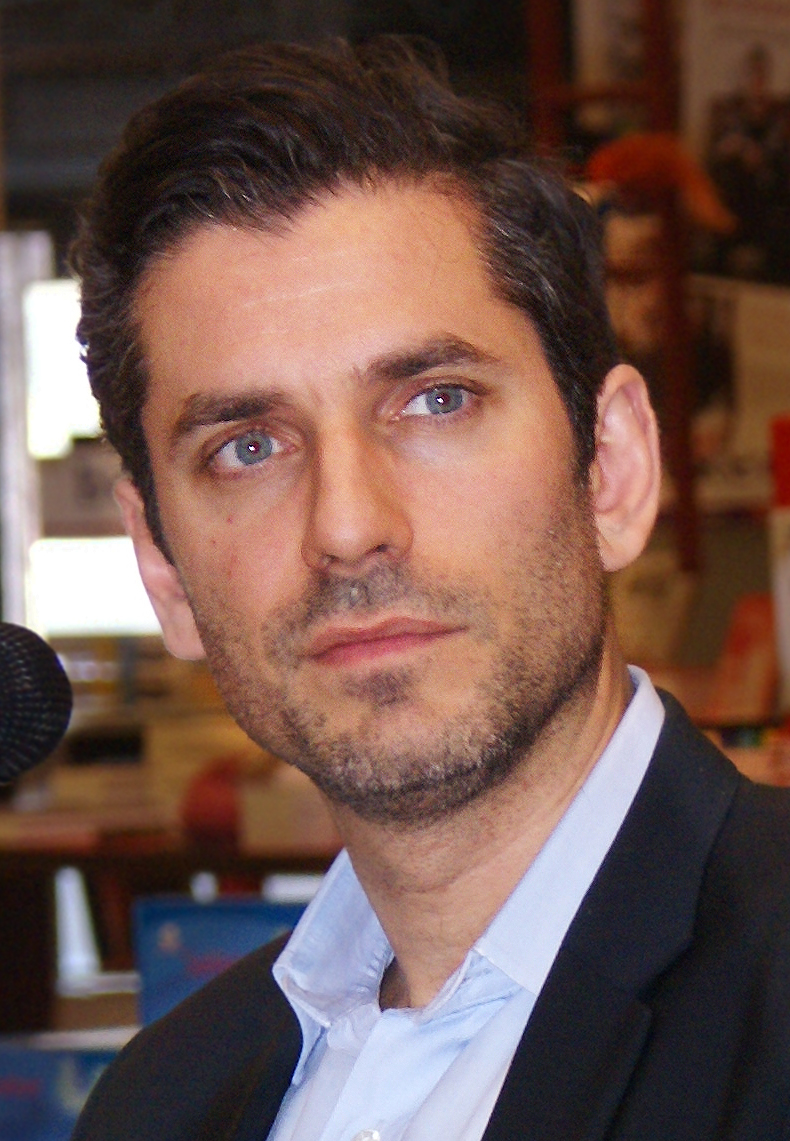
- Jens Lapidus in 2011
- Born: Jens Jacob Lapidus; 24 May 1974 (age 52); Hägersten, Sweden
- Occupations: Crime novelist, lawyer
- Writing career
- Genre: Crime fiction
- Subjects: Crime, thriller, mystery, noir
- Notable work: Easy Money
- Website: www.jenslapidus.se

Jens Jacob Lapidus (Swedish: [ˈjɛnːs laˈpǐːdɵs]; born 24 May 1974) is a Swedish criminal defense lawyer and author known for his books about the Stockholm underworld.

== Life and career ==
Lapidus was born into a middle class family in the Stockholm suburb Gröndal, with a mother who was a social worker. His family is Jewish. As a young man he was active in the Stureplan party scene, which plays a role in his novels. He made his writing debut in August 2006 with Easy Money, an account of the Stockholm underworld, and the first of his Stockholm Noir trilogy. Two years later the second installment Aldrig fucka upp was published by Wahlström & Widstrand. A graphic novel with illustrator Peter Bergting (The Portent) entitled Gängkrig 145 was published in May 2009. While this project does take place in the same universe as the novels, it is not the third part of the Stockholm Noir trilogy but rather a side story. The third part was published in 2011 with the title Livet deluxe. In 2014 Lapidus published the novel VIP-rummet which is the start of a new series unrelated to his Stockholm Noir trilogy. The second part STHLM Delete was published in 2015. His writing has been compared to James Ellroy's and Dennis Lehane's. The third part Top Dog in the new series was published in 2017 (in English in 2018). Other books are the dystopia Paradis city and Mr Ett fourth book about Emelie and Teddy (Top Dogg trilogy)

== Films and TV-series ==
The Stockholm Noir trilogy has been adapted into a Swedish trilogy of films: Easy Money (2010), Easy Money II: Hard to Kill (2012), and Easy Money III: Life Deluxe (2013). And in 2021 into a Netflix series, Snabba Cash which takes place ten years after the film trilogy. Together with two others Lapidus has written the TV-series Advokaten. Another TV-adaptation is Top dog in two seasons. Lex Lapidus is a series of TV-programs in Swedish television about the judicial system in different countries.

Lapidus has also together with his wife Hedda published a series of children's books, Dillstaligan.

Jens Lapidus lives in Stockholm with his wife, Hedda, one daughter and two sons.

Lapidus also does some modelling work and has among others represented Cartier.

Lapidus is a legal expert at TV4 TV-channel commenting on crime and legal issues.

2025, the legal series Rättegången, The trial ", is sent by the Swedish broadcasting company SVT.

== Bibliography ==
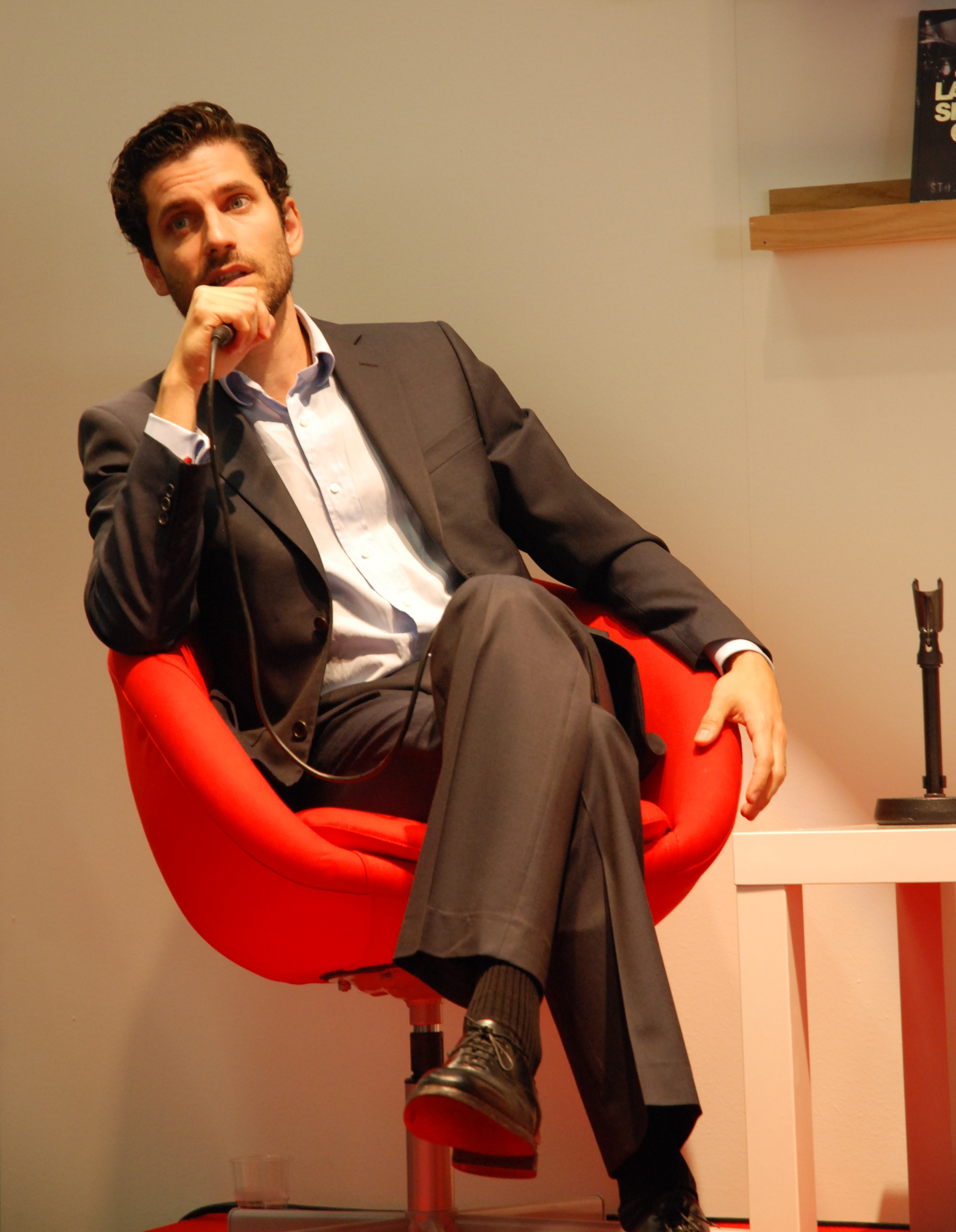
Lapidus in 2008

=== Novels ===
==== The Stockholm Noir trilogy ====
- Snabba cash (2006) (English publication: "Easy Money")
- Aldrig fucka upp (2008) (English publication: "Never Fuck Up"/ "Never Screw Up")
- Livet deluxe (2011) (English publication: "Life Deluxe")

==== New series ====
- VIP-rummet (2014) (English Translation: "VIP-room")
- STHLM Delete (2015) (English Translation: "Stockholm delete")
- Topp dogg (2017) (English Translation: "Top dog")

=== Other novels ===
- Paradis City (2021) Set in a dystopian version Scandinavia
- Mr Ett (2022) fourth book about Emelie and Teddy (Top Dogg trilogy)

=== Graphic Novel ===
- Gängkrig 145 (2009) (English Translation: "Gang War 145")

=== Short story collection ===
- Mamma försökte (2012) (English Translation: "Mama Tried")
