= Avalon (2011 film) =

- Directed by: Axel Petersén
- Written by: Axel Petersén
- Produced by: Jesper Kurlandsky; Erika Wasserman
- Starring: Johannes Brost; Peter Carlberg; Kelly Marlow
- Cinematography: Måns Månsson
- Edited by: Theis Schmidt
- Music by: Julian Hruza
- Release date: 11 September 2011 (TIFF)
- Running time: 79 minutes
- Country: Sweden
- Language: Swedish

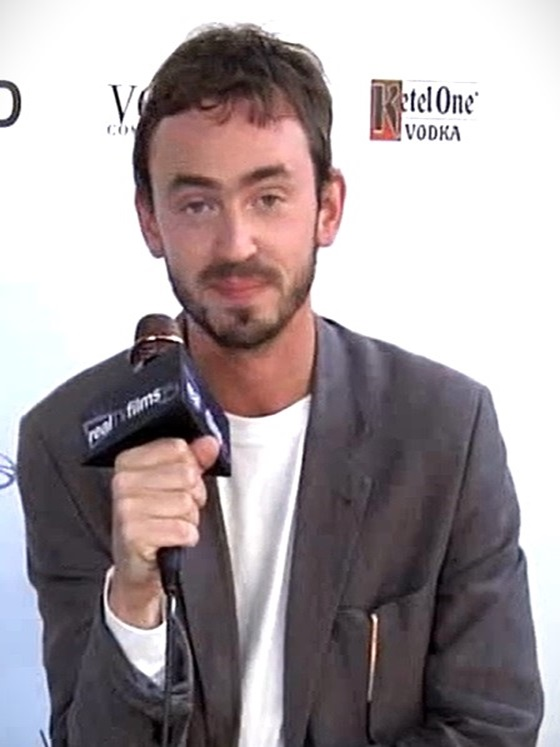
Axel Petersén interviewed at Toronto International Film Festival 2011

Avalon is a 2011 Swedish drama film directed by Axel Petersén.

== Plot ==
Janne has just finished a prolonged sentence where he was forced to wear an ankle monitor because of unlawful real estate dealings. Finally a free man Janne is preparing the grand opening of his Båstad nightclub "Avalon". In the 1980s Janne was a successful manager of a nightclub and longs back to that period which was the best time in his life. He is aided by his sister Jackie and is old friend Klas. He is also trying to rekindle his estranged daughter. With "Avalon" looking to be a big success, Janne's newfound happiness is soon shattered when he accidentally kills a baltic guest worker.

== Cast ==
- Johannes Brost – Janne
- Peter Carlberg – Klas
- Leonore Ekstrand – Jackie, Janne's sister
- Carl Johan De Geer – Leif
- Charlotte Wandt - Agnes, Janne's daughter
- Simas Lindesis - Donatas, the guestworker
- Migle Polikeviciute - Irina, Donatas' girlfriend
- Malou Stiller - Stefanie
- Henrik Lilliér - Becker, a Småland-gangster
- Stefan Huynh - Tonny
- August Wittgenstein - Michel

== Spin-off ==
In 2017 there was a spin-off focusing on the character Becker, called Becker - the king of Tingsryd.
