= Hannah med H =

- Swedish cover
- Directed by: Christina Olofson
- Screenplay by: Per Nilsson; Annika Thor
- Based on: Ett annat sätt att vara ung by Per Nilsson
- Produced by: Christina Olofson
- Starring: Tove Edfeldt; Joel Kinnaman; Adnan Zorlak
- Cinematography: Robert Nordström
- Release date: 12 December 2003 (Sweden)
- Running time: 96 minutes
- Country: Sweden
- Language: Swedish

Hannah med H is a 2003 Swedish film, about an 18-year-old woman named Hannah (Tove Edfeldt), who has just moved away from home. She meets a man named Jens (Thomas Mørk), claiming to be a teacher who admires her poetry. However, she starts to receive prank calls, and feels she is being watched. She then discovers that "Jens" is not actually called Jens, or a teacher at all. The soundtrack for this film was created by the Swedish electropop band The Knife, and released as an album, Hannah med H Soundtrack.

== Cast ==
- Tove Edfeldt as Hannah Andersen
- Joel Kinnaman as Andreas
- Adnan Zorlak as Edin
- Bibjana Mustafaj as Milena
- Thomas Mørk as Jens Nosslin
- Anna Larsson as Anna
- Neda Kozic as Cattis (as Neda Kocic)
- Anneli Martini as Hannah's mother
- Niels Andersen as Hannah's father
- Pär Luttrop as Hannah's brother Martin
- Johanna Wilson as Martin's wife
