= Marietta von Hausswolff von Baumgarten =

Swedish screenwriter

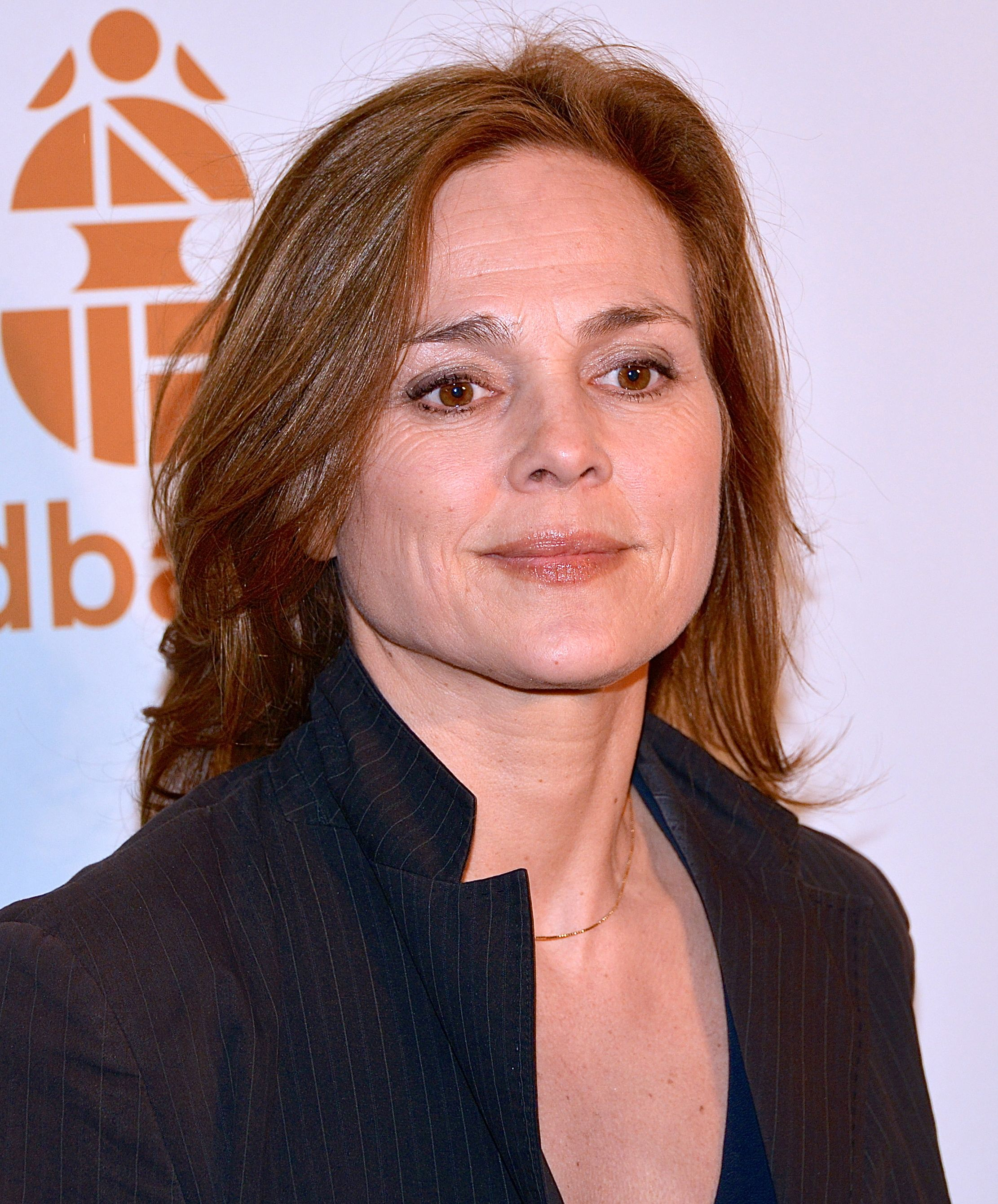
Marietta von Hausswolff von Baumgarten

Marietta von Hausswolff von Baumgarten (née von Baumgarten) is a Swedish screenwriter from Stockholm. She wrote the screenplay for the 2012 Guldbagge nominee film Call Girl. She also co-produced the film.

== Career ==
Von Baumgarten is an international script advisor who worked with development of films such as Mediterranea (Jonas Carpigano), The Babadook (Jennifer Kent), H (Rania Attieh, Daniel Garcia), Djeca, Children of Sarajevo (Aida Begic) Alaverdi (Maria Sachyan), Los Hongos (Oscar Ruiz Navia), The Dog Show (Ralston Jover), Svinalängorna/Beyond (Pernilla August), Hi -So ( Aditya Assarat), Les Quattro Volte (Michelangelo Frammartino) The Slut (Hagar Ben-Asher) Short Skin (Ducchio Chiarini) and the upcoming Rey by Niles Attallah, Blanka by Kohki Hasei, Underground Fragrance by Pengfei Song and The Fits by Anna Rose Holmer.

== Personal life ==
Von Baumgarten is married to Swedish artist Carl Michael von Hausswolff, father of Anna von Hausswolff and Maria von Hausswolff, and she also has three sons, Georg von Baumgarten, Erwin von Baumgarten, and Julius von Hausswolff. She is the daughter of journalist Marianne von Baumgarten-Lindberg.
