= The Portent =

Cover of the first issue

The Portent is a comic book by Peter Bergting, published by Image Comics. Bergting writes, draws and colors the comic himself. In a world set in its twilight days, the series follows Milo, a deeply troubled warrior, on his quest for redemption through a land beset by demons and the spirits of the dead.
