= Peter Carlberg =

Swedish actor

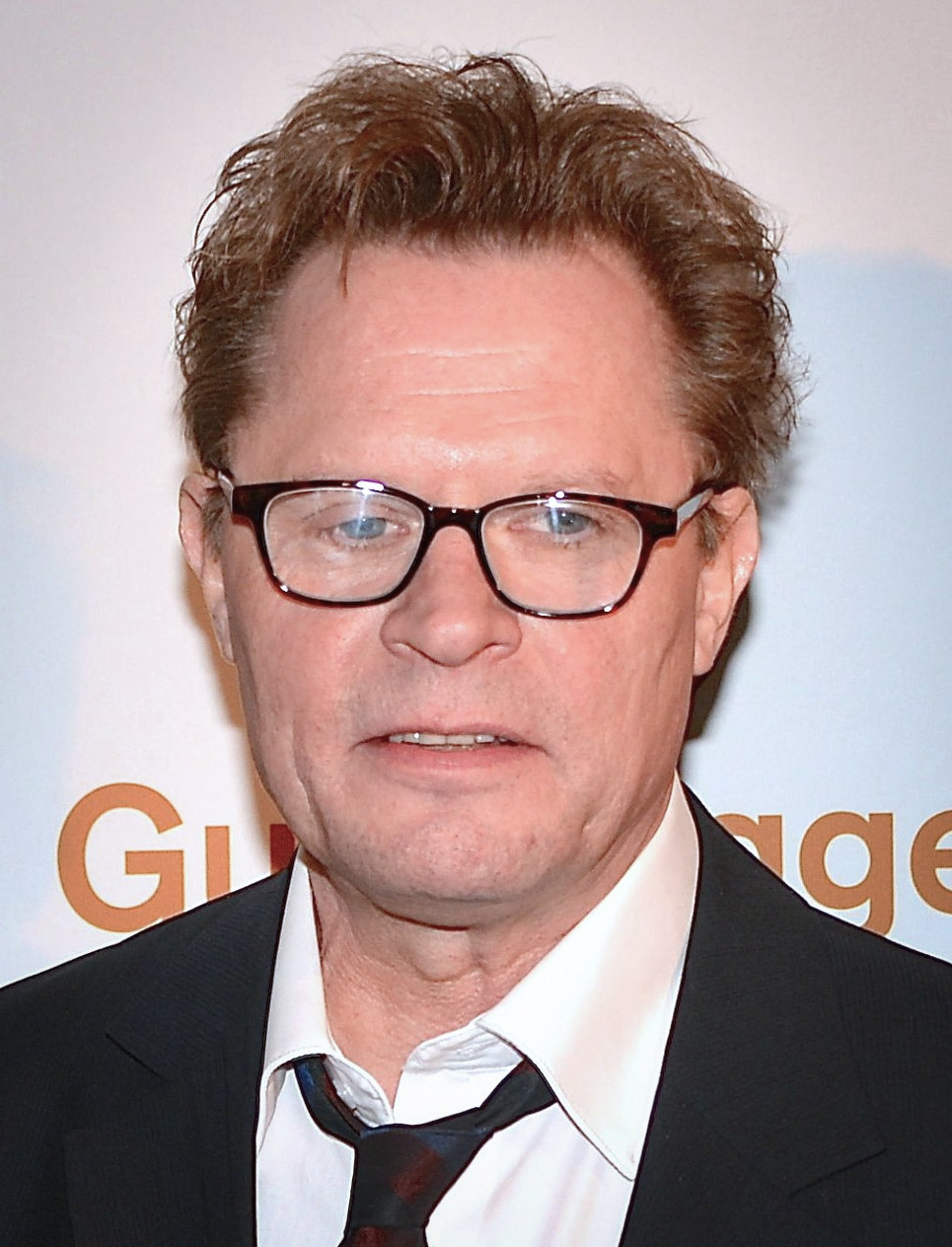
- Born: Peter Sigvard Carlberg; 8 December 1950 (age 75); Stockholm, Sweden
- Occupation: Actor

Peter Sigvard Carlberg (born 8 December 1950) is a Swedish actor. He was educated at the Swedish National Academy of Mime and Acting.

== Filmography ==
=== Feature films ===
- 2012 - Call Girl
- 2011 - Avalon
- 2010 - Trust Me
- 2008 - Let the Right One In - Lacke
- 2004 - Bombay Dreams
- 2004 - Skjærsild

=== Short films ===
- 1992 - Den flygande norrlänningen - the father

=== TV series ===
- 2013 - Crimes of Passion
- 2007 - Beck - Det tause skriket
- 2007 - Höök - Janne Hall
- 2005 - God morgon alla barn – Kent
