= Easy Money (Lapidus novel) =

2006 novel by Jens Lapidus

Snabba cash
- Author: Jens Lapidus
- Language: Swedish
- Genre: Crime fiction, hardboiled
- Publisher: Wahlström & Widstrand
- Publication date: 2006
- Publication place: Sweden
- Media type: Print (Hardback & Paperback)
- Pages: 474 pp

Easy Money (Swedish title: Snabba cash) is a 2006 novel by Jens Lapidus. The paperback was the fourth bestselling Swedish novel of 2007.

The first book in the Stockholm Noir trilogy, it was adapted into a film in 2010 starring Joel Kinnaman and a narratively unrelated Netflix TV series bearing the same name in 2021 and subsequently a second season in 2022.

== Plot summary ==
JW is a young man originally from the countryside who now lives in Stockholm. JW feigns the appearance of a stekare (in Swedish parlance, a lifestyle based on flaunting one's apparent wealth; a jetsetter or yuppie), actually leading a double life driving taxi illegally to finance his expensive life on Stureplan. Abdulkarim, who runs the taxi business, offers JW a job selling cocaine instead. JW accepts the offer and enters the criminal underground of Stockholm. Jorge Salinas Barrio is a Latino who has gone to prison after taking the blame for drug business in which the Yugoslav mafia was involved. He escapes from Österåker Prison with plans to flee the country. Mrado Slovovic is a Serbian henchman who runs errands for the Yugoslav mafia, but secretly he dreams of a normal life with his daughter Lovisa.

The three characters unite in the book through their dreams about quick earnings. Once JW and Abdulkarim have the cocaine sales going they want to expand. Abdulkarim has heard of Jorge, the recent escapee. The word on the street is that Jorge got very knowledgeable about the cocaine trade while he was in prison and thus JW gets an assignment to hire him. Simultaneously Jorge has tried to blackmail the Yugoslav mafia boss. The hitman Mrado has been contracted to dissuade him. When JW finally finds Jorge he is laying beaten-up in a forest, courtesy of Mrado.
