= Easy Money (2010 film) =

- DVD cover
- Directed by: Daniel Espinosa
- Screenplay by: Maria Karlsson
- Story by: Daniel Espinosa; Abdullahi Ahmed Sattarvandi; Fredrik Wikström
- Based on: Easy Money by Jens Lapidus
- Produced by: Fredrik Wikström
- Starring: Joel Kinnaman; Matias Varela; Dragomir Mrsic
- Cinematography: Aril Wretblad
- Edited by: Theis Schmidt
- Music by: Jon Ekstrand
- Production company: Tre Vänner Produktion AB
- Distributed by: Nordisk Film
- Release date: 15 January 2010
- Running time: 124 minutes
- Country: Sweden
- Languages: Swedish, Spanish, Serbian
- Budget: SEK30 million
- Box office: SEK59.1 million

Easy Money (Swedish: Snabba cash) is a Swedish crime thriller film directed by Daniel Espinosa (in his directorial debut) that was released on 15 January 2010. It is based on the 2006 novel of the same name by Jens Lapidus. Joel Kinnaman stars in the lead role of Johan "JW" Westlund, a rather poor man living a double life in the upper class areas of Stockholm. After meeting a wealthy girl, he is enticed into the world of organized crime and begins to sell cocaine to afford his expensive lifestyle. Easy Money was well received by critics and was a hit at the box office.

Two sequels to the film have been made: Easy Money II (2012) and Easy Money III (2013). In 2010, Warner Bros. announced their plans for an American remake of Easy Money starring Zac Efron, but the project was shelved. In 2021, the TV series Snabba Cash was released on Netflix, containing 6 episodes based on the original novel. A second season was announced in June 2021, and released in September 2022.

== Plot ==
Johan "JW" Westlund is a man living in Stockholm and is a promising student at the Stockholm School of Economics. JW is originally from the Norrland region in Sweden where his father, who has a slight drinking problem, works in a saw mill, while his mother works in an employment agency. JW is wracked by the disappearance of his sister, Camilla, four years earlier. JW feigns the appearance of a stekare (in Swedish parlance, a lifestyle based on flaunting one's apparent wealth, similar to yuppies), actually leading a double life driving taxi illegally to finance his expensive life on Stureplan. A romance with the upper-class girl Sophie leads to him being enticed into the world of organized crime. Abdulkarim, who is running the taxi business, offers JW a job in helping him start his cocaine business.

Jorge Salinas Barrio is a Chilean man who went to prison after being caught in the drug business. He has now escaped and is on the run from the police. Jorge knows everything about cocaine. He has a plan: to avenge those who wronged him, among them Serbian Mafia boss Radovan Kranjic, and to make one final cocaine delivery and then leave the country for good.

Mrado Slovovic, a hitman who runs errands for the Serbian Mafia, is sent by Radovan on a mission to take care of Jorge. At the same time, he has to struggle with taking care of his eight-year-old daughter, who he is forced to take with him on his job because the mother has a drug addiction.

These three characters cross paths through their dreams about quick earnings. Once JW and Abdulkarim begin their cocaine business, they want to expand. Abdulkarim has heard that Jorge, who has escaped from prison by this time, has learned everything about the cocaine business while in prison. Simultaneously, Jorge has tried to blackmail Radovan, the Serbian Mafia boss. Mrado is tasked by Radovan to kill Jorge to prevent him from helping any of Radovan's competitors. Meanwhile, JW is promised 20,000 SEK if he can bring Jorge back to Abdulkarim alive. After noticing Mrado following Jorge, JW tails both of them, losing sight of Jorge when he gets on a bus. JW fortuitously finds them when he notices the car he saw Mrado drive away in standing in a forest clearing. When he enters the forest, he finds Mrado and one of Radovan's henchmen savagely beating Jorge. JW sets off the car alarm of the Serbian attackers to distract them. Meanwhile, Jorge hides from his attackers, who then travel further into the forest to find him. JW approaches a badly wounded Jorge and takes him back to his dormitory. Abdulkarim visits JW and Jorge and helps Jorge recuperate. Though hesitant about keeping Jorge in his dorm room, JW relents when Abdulkarim offers him 1000 SEK for every day Jorge stays. As Jorge recuperates, he learns more about JW and the two become friends.

At one of the jetsetter parties, JW falls for Sophie (Lisa Henni), the on and off girlfriend of jet-setter Carl. JW learns that Carl's father's investment bank is in serious financial trouble and Carl may not be able to afford the extravagant stekare lifestyle. This becomes important when Abdulkarim asks JW to figure out how they can launder the 20,000,000 SEK profit they will eventually earn. JW proposes that they buy shares of Carl's father's failing bank, giving it a stimulus that would not only save the business but immediately increase the price of the shares, making it more profitable. JW acts as the front man for Abdulkarim's cocaine syndicate as they attempt to purchase the bank. Though Carl's father has reservations, he eventually relents and accepts the deal.

Soon after, JW and the drug syndicate visit Jorge's drug dealer friends in Germany. The drug dealers show how they smuggle drugs by inserting drug capsules under the skin of dogs and then letting the incision heal and the hair grow back which takes two months according to the drug dealers. The drug dealers also place drug capsules in the leaves of young cabbage plants and then let the cabbage grow a full size head around the capsule. Abdulkarim's syndicate ultimately negotiates for a shipment of 40 kilos of pure cocaine. The drug dealers want the money deposited in a Swiss account. JW immediately raises concerns about that plan, arguing that Switzerland is not that secret anymore and recommends an account in Andorra or Liechtenstein instead. This gains the drug dealer's trust and allows the transaction to run smoothly. Later, Jorge advises that JW that he is unlikely to see the money promised by Abdulkarim. JW visits Abdulkarim in his hideout and, while talking with Abdulkarim, realizes that what Jorge said was true.

Mrado is waiting with his daughter at JW's apartment building and offers JW two million for assistance in raiding Abdulkarim's drug shipment. JW agrees on the understanding that no one will get hurt. The drugs arrive in an eighteen-wheeler full of cabbages. Jorge and Abdulkarim's men start repackaging the drugs in a warehouse. Meanwhile, JW assists Mrado and one of Mrado's Serbian friends in entering the warehouse. A firefight occurs and one of Abdulkarim's men is seriously wounded immediately. JW is shocked by the turn of events. Jorge realizes that JW has double crossed them. Meanwhile, Radovan has phoned the police to report the drug delivery. JW grabs a weapon and holds off the Serbians as the police arrive and a firefight breaks out. JW and Jorge escape to the rooftop and eventually get to a car. Mrado's friend is seriously wounded, but intends to hold off the others so that Mrado can escape. As Mrado runs from an alley, he is hit and seriously injured by the car with Jorge and JW in it. JW, the least injured of the three, is angry with Mrado who had promised that no one would get hurt. JW shoots Mrado. JW then fires shots at the policemen closing in, thereby allowing Jorge to escape in the car. JW then surrenders to the police. Mrado is taken away by ambulance and calls his daughter on the way to the hospital. Jorge drives off into a forest and is last seen running through a field similar to the field that he ran through after escaping from prison.

The movie ends with JW in prison with tattoos of "JW" and "Camilla" on his arms. He is visited by Sophie who still cares deeply for JW, but she is leaving Sweden to stay at her parents’ house in France. She asks JW if he cares for her. JW appears to care for Sophie, but says nothing. As Sophie leaves, she relays a message from Jorge who says that Paola had a baby girl. JW says that if Jorge calls again, tell him that '"Mr. Brains" says 'Hello.'"

== Cast ==
- Joel Kinnaman as Johan "JW" Westlund
- Matias Varela as Jorge Salinas Barrio
- Dragomir Mrsic as Mrado Slovovic
- Lisa Henni as Sophie
- Mahmut Suvakci as Abdulkarim
- Jones Danko as Fahdi
- Lea Stojanov as Lovisa
- Dejan Čukić as Radovan Kranjic
- Miodrag Stojanovic as Nenad
- Joel Spira as Nippe
- Christian Hillborg as Jetset-Carl
- Jan Waldekranz as Carls' father
- Annika Ryberg Whittembury as Paola Salinas Barrio
- Fares Fares as Mahmoud

== Production ==
Jens Lapidus released the novel Snabba cash in 2006. It received praise from critics and was a success in terms of sales. Ever since it came out, Swedish director Daniel Espinosa dreamed of getting the opportunity to adapt it into a film. The opportunity came only a few years later when he met film producer Fredrik Wikström who asked him to direct the film. Espinosa has said that the book is important to him because of his Chilean roots and because he was raised in the Swedish suburbs. "When I lived in Skogås there were not so many Chileans, so I hung out with Yugoslavians [...] until I was 17 years old. Then a lot of crazy stuff happened and I ended up at Sigtuna with a bunch of upper class brats."

Joel Kinnaman was cast in the lead role of Johan "JW" Westlund. He told Helsingborgs Dagblad that "It is a difficult role and a difficult character to play. I love my character deeply, but he makes a lot of decisions in life that are idiotic and he chooses paths that lead to disaster and that gets unbelievably painful consequences for both him and the people that mean something for him." Filming began in March 2009 in Stockholm. Other shooting locations include Gothenburg and Germany (9–11 June 2009).

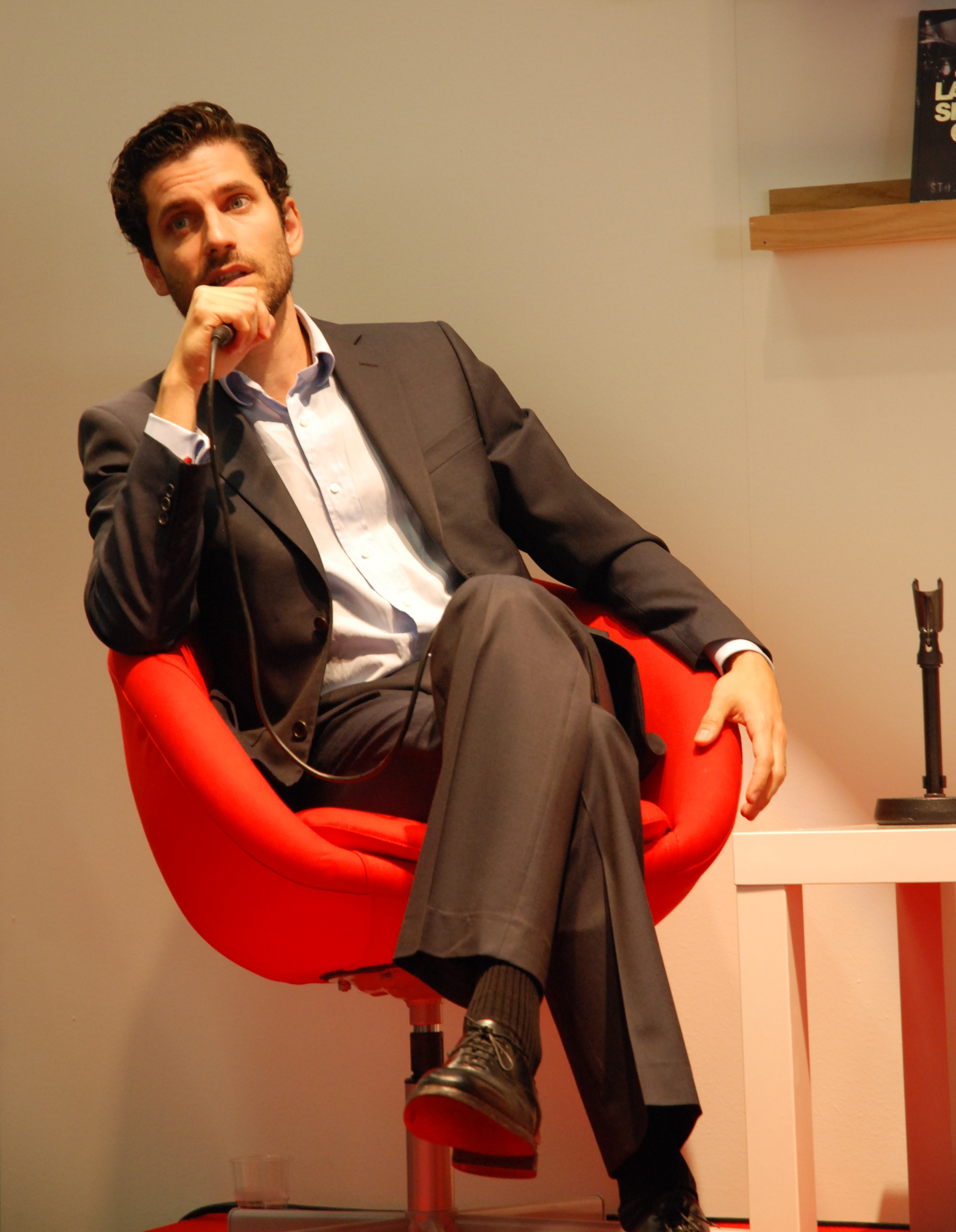
Jens Lapidus, author of the novel Snabba cash

In December 2009 Lapidus told the newspaper Svenska Dagbladet that he had seen an early version of the film and "it feels good. The film is based on my book, but is at the same time a story of its own. Naturally my main characters are in it and they have managed to capture the authentic feel, but I haven't written the manuscript, I've only given pointers." Lapidus has written two back-to-back sequels to Snabba cash, which are also to be adapted into films. Filming began in the summer of 2011 with Babak Najafi as director and most of the main cast members from the first film. Easy Money II: Hard to Kill was released in August 2012 and the second sequel Easy Money III: Life Deluxe was released on 30 August 2013.

== Distribution ==
Easy Money was released in Sweden on 15 January 2010. At the Berlin Film Festival film festival that year it raised international interest. The American film studio The Weinstein Company soon acquired the rights, after a bidding war, to distribute the film in the United States, Germany, and Italy.

== Remake ==
After a bidding on the project, involving Warner Bros., Universal Studios, Summit Entertainment, Paramount Pictures, 20th Century Fox, The Weinstein Company, and Mandate Pictures - Warner Bros. won the rights to produce an American remake. Zac Efron will star in and produce the film.

Fredrik Wikström, a producer of Swedish film, will also be a producer on Warner Bros.'s remake. He commented on the hype of the original film in Sweden: "We had a huge hype for the film before anyone had even seen it; everyone was hoping it would be the next Stieg Larsson. The film premiered January 15 in Sweden, and the eyes were on us from the start. Somehow a bootleg DVD of the film made it to L.A. and was passed around. We started getting calls. Less than three months later we did the deal with Warner Bros."

== Reception ==
Easy Money was an instant hit in Sweden with more than 100,000 tickets sold during the film's first weekend in theaters, topping the box office charts. Aftonbladet critic Karolina Fjellborg gave it four out of five stars, commenting that Espinosa "has made a believable, well-acted, nice-looking, and surprisingly thrilling film, with a nerve and a pace that is often missing in Swedish thrillers." She also praised the cast of the film, Kinnaman in particular. Expressen's Miranda Sigander wrote that Kinnaman plays JW "in a natural and convincing way and steals the show with his charisma."

Mats Johnson of Göteborgs-Posten gave the film a 3/5 rating for "the realism and the intensity in the best scenes of the film, and for the convincing acting by the main cast members." He added, however, that the film lacks coherence and that the story becomes disjointed because of the constant jumps between the three main characters. Sveriges Television's Jerker Peterson, on the other hand, thought that Espinosa and his writer Maria Karlsson were able to "nicely keep together the straggling story." He gave the film a rating of four out of five and commented that it is "altogether a really sharp thriller and a good start to the Swedish film year."

In his book Swedish Sensationsfilms: A Clandestine History of Sex, Thrillers, and Kicker Cinema, Daniel Ekeroth notes that the movie is, unlike many other Swedish crime films, "without any tired old inspectors" and that that fact is "reason enough for praise!" He continues by saying that Snabba Cash has "sharp pacing, a fresh storyline, and above all a sinister portrayal of Stockholm as a cold and dark place."
