= Joel Kinnaman =

Swedish actor (born 1979)

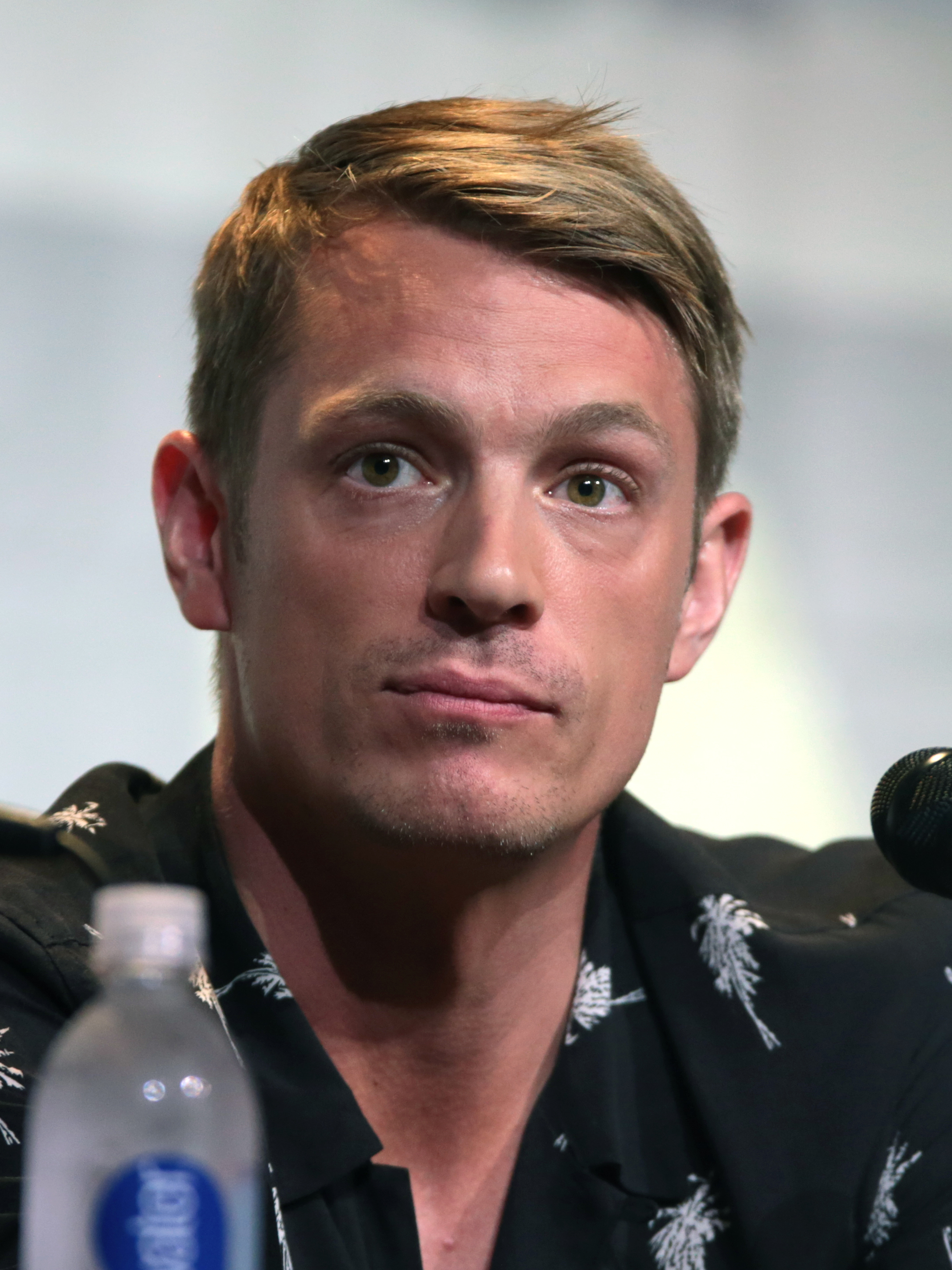
- Kinnaman in 2016
- Born: Charles Joel Nordström Kinnaman; 25 November 1979 (age 46); Stockholm, Sweden
- Citizenship: Sweden; United States
- Occupation: Actor
- Years active: 1990–present
- Spouses: Cleo Wattenström (m. 2015; div. 2018) Kelly Gale (m. 2024)
- Relatives: Melinda Kinnaman (half-sister)

Charles Joel Nordström Kinnaman (Swedish pronunciation: [ˈjǔːɛl ˈkɪ̂nːaˌman]; born 25 November 1979) is a Swedish-American actor. He first gained recognition for his roles in the 2010 Swedish film Easy Money and the Johan Falk crime series. Kinnaman is known internationally for his television roles as Detective Stephen Holder in AMC's The Killing, Takeshi Kovacs in the first season of Altered Carbon, and Governor Will Conway in the American version of House of Cards. He has also played Alex Murphy in the 2014 RoboCop remake, and Rick Flag in the DC Comics superhero films Suicide Squad (2016) and The Suicide Squad (2021). From 2019 to 2026, he starred as NASA astronaut Ed Baldwin in the Apple TV+ science fiction drama series For All Mankind.

== Early life ==
Kinnaman was born and raised in Stockholm, Sweden. His mother, Bitte (née Nordström), a therapist, is a Swedish citizen. His father, Steve Kinnaman (originally David Kinnaman), is an American who was drafted during the Vietnam War and deserted the military from his base in Bangkok. Kinnaman is a dual citizen of Sweden and the United States. His father, whose family was from the American Midwest, is of Irish and Scottish descent; his maternal grandmother is of Ukrainian Jewish descent.

He has five sisters, one of whom is actress Melinda Kinnaman (paternal half-sister). During his childhood, Kinnaman learned two languages as he "spoke English with my dad and Swedish with my mom". He grew up with fellow actors Alexander Skarsgård and Noomi Rapace, and spent a year in Del Valle, Texas, as a high school exchange student. After graduating from high school, he decided to travel around the world. To finance the trips, he worked in various jobs — as a beer factory line worker and roof-sweeper in Norway, and as a bar manager in the French Alps. He then traveled for four to five months at a time over a period of two years in Southeast Asia and South America, the latter with fellow Scandinavian actor David Dencik.

== Career ==
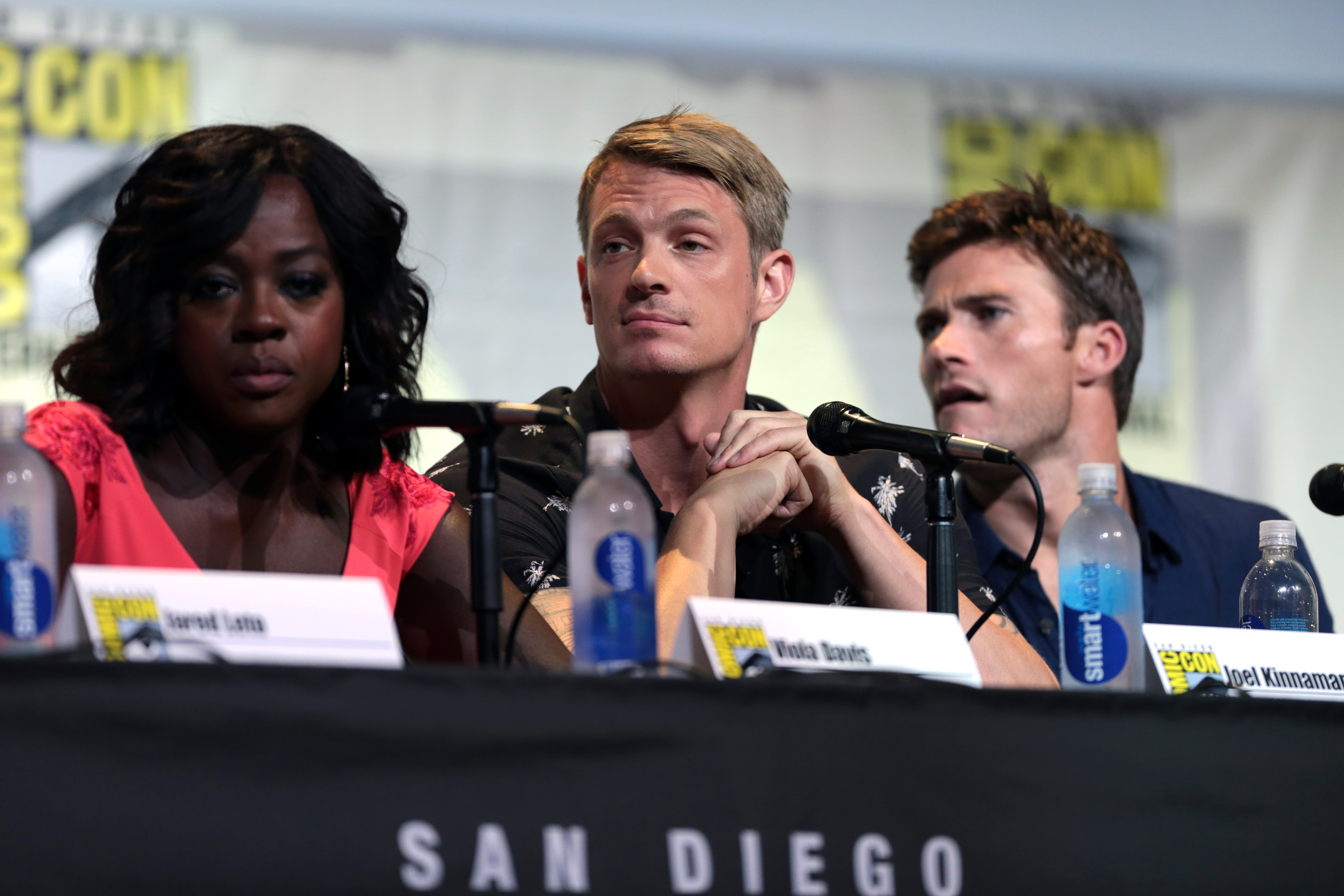
Kinnaman at the 2016 San Diego Comic-Con to promote Suicide Squad

Kinnaman began his acting career as a child actor in Swedish soap opera Storstad (1990). His older sister was dating one of the show's directors, and he asked Kinnaman to audition for a part on the show. After portraying Felix Lundström in 22 episodes, he stepped away from acting.

Kinnaman restarted his acting career in 2002. While studying at drama school, Kinnaman featured in several films such as Hannah med H and God Save the King (Swedish: Tjenare kungen). He also worked on productions staged at the Backa Theatre in Gothenburg. He graduated from Malmö Theatre Academy in 2007 and started working at the Gothenburg City Theatre. In the same year, he attracted the attention of Swedish media with the role of Raskolnikov in a stage adaptation of Crime and Punishment. In 2009, he starred in the film In Your Veins (Swedish: I skuggan av värmen) and played the role of a police informant in six films of the Johan Falk film series. He was cast in the film Easy Money (released January 2010), which brought him mainstream attention in Sweden and at the international film market, and also earned him a Guldbagge Award in the Best Actor category.

Looking to expand his acting career, Kinnaman hired an agent in the United States. It was announced in the spring of 2010 that he would be making his international film debut in the thriller The Darkest Hour, which began filming in Moscow in June 2010 and was released in December 2011. Between April 2011 and August 2014, Kinnaman had a four-season starring role as Detective Stephen Holder in the AMC television series The Killing, based on the Danish television series Forbrydelsen. Kinnaman was one of the contenders for the lead roles in Thor (2011) and Mad Max: Fury Road (2015). Although Kinnaman said that he is eager to work and become recognized in the U.S., he added that "I absolutely don't feel that I have to take any role that I can get just because it is the United States. I'm looking for something interesting, I'm still young in my artistry, and I must dare to do things even when there's a risk for failure".

In 2012, Kinnaman reunited with Easy Money director Daniel Espinosa in the latter's Hollywood debut, Safe House, and also starred in the indie film Lola Versus. On 3 March 2012, it was confirmed that Kinnaman would play the lead role of Alex James Murphy/RoboCop in the remake of 1987's RoboCop. The film was released in February 2014. In 2015, he starred in the action thriller Run All Night and mystery drama Child 44.

In 2016, Kinnaman played Rick Flag in the Warner Bros. film adaptation of DC Comics anti-hero team Suicide Squad, directed by David Ayer. He reprised his role as Rick Flag in its 2021 sequel/soft reboot, The Suicide Squad, directed by James Gunn. He also starred in the independent drama-thriller film Edge of Winter, in which he plays Elliot Baker, a father of two who takes his children on a shooting trip that goes wrong. The film was released on demand on 27 July 2016, and in select theaters on 12 August 2016.

Between 2016 and 2019, Kinnaman worked on four different original productions of streaming television networks such as Netflix, Amazon Prime Video and Apple TV+. Kinnaman played Governor Will Conway in Seasons 4 and 5 of the American version of House of Cards on the streaming service Netflix, and the protagonist Takeshi Kovacs in Netflix's Altered Carbon, an adaption of Richard K. Morgan's hardboiled cyberpunk science fiction novel of the same name. Also in 2019, Kinnaman starred as Erik in the Amazon Prime Video series Hanna, an adaptation of the 2011 action film of the same name. Since 2019, Kinnaman starred as NASA astronaut Ed Baldwin in the Apple TV+ original science fiction space drama series For All Mankind.

In 2019, Kinnaman played Pete Koslow in Andrea Di Stefano's action thriller film The Informer. In 2020, Kinnaman starred as Thomas Steinman in Yuval Adler's post-war thriller The Secrets We Keep. Kinnaman also starred in Jérémie Guez's crime drama Brothers by Blood which was released in the United States in 2021. In January 2021, it was announced that Kinnaman was cast in Season 4 of the In Treatment reboot at HBO. He will star as Adam, the on and off boyfriend of the main character Dr. Brooke Taylor (played by Uzo Aduba). He also reprised his role as Ed Baldwin in Season 2 of For All Mankind, which aired in 2021.

Between 2022 and 2023, Kinnaman reprised his role as Ed Baldwin in Season 3 of For All Mankind and once again for Season 4, airing in 2022 and 2023 respectively.

== Personal life ==
Kinnaman grew up with the condition of pectus excavatum, with a caved-in appearance of the chest. He underwent surgery prior to the filming of Altered Carbon, inserting two metal bars to push the sternum outward.

Kinnaman is a fan of his hometown football club Hammarby IF from an early age.

In his roles in American movies, he is said to have "no detectable accent," something, he admits, on which he has had to work when he realized his American accent was "not perfect."

Kinnaman was married to Swedish tattoo artist Cleo Wattenström from 2015 to 2018. In early 2019, he began a relationship with Swedish-Australian model Kelly Gale. The couple announced their engagement in January 2021 and, at the 2024 Burning Man Festival in Black Rock City, Nevada, they were married in an "intimate ceremony."

On 6 August 2021, Kinnaman obtained a temporary restraining order against Gabriella Magnusson, who, he alleged, was threatening to extort him on the basis of their 2018 "brief romantic" relationship. Magnusson denied any intention to extort Kinnaman.

On 11 August 2021, Gabriella Magnusson accused Kinnaman of negligent rape. The preliminary investigation by law enforcement and the Swedish Prosecution Authority concluded, in October 2022, that no crime could be proven to have taken place and that, therefore, the case is closed.

== Filmography ==
=== Film ===
Key
†	Denotes films that have not yet been released

Year	Title	Role	Notes
2002	Den osynlige	Kalle	
2003	Hannah med H	Andreas	
2005	Tjenare kungen	Dickan	
2005	Storm	Bartender	
2007	Arn – The Knight Templar	Sverker Karlsson	
2008	Arn – The Kingdom at Road's End	Sverker Karlsson	
2009	In Your Veins	Erik	
2009	Johan Falk – Gruppen för särskilda insatser	Frank Wagner	
2009	Johan Falk – Vapenbröder	Frank Wagner	
2009	Johan Falk – National Target	Frank Wagner	
2009	Johan Falk – Leo Gaut	Frank Wagner	
2009	Johan Falk – Operation Näktergal	Frank Wagner	
2009	Johan Falk – De fredlösa	Frank Wagner	
2009	Simon & Malou	Stefan	
2010	Easy Money	Johan "JW" Westlund	
2011	The Girl with the Dragon Tattoo	Christer Malm	
2011	The Darkest Hour	Skyler	
2012	Safe House	Keller	
2012	Lola Versus	Luke	
2012	Easy Money II: Hard to Kill	Johan "JW" Westlund	
2012	Johan Falk – Spelets regler	Frank Wagner	
2012	Johan Falk – De 107 patrioterna	Frank Wagner	
2012	Johan Falk – Alla råns moder	Frank Wagner	
2012	Johan Falk – Organizatsija Karayan	Frank Wagner	
2012	Johan Falk – Barninfiltratören	Frank Wagner	
2012	Johan Falk – Kodnamn Lisa	Frank Wagner	
2013	Easy Money III: Life Deluxe	Johan "JW" Westlund	
2014	RoboCop	Alex Murphy / RoboCop	
2015	Knight of Cups	Errol	
2015	Run All Night	Mike Conlon	
2015	Child 44	Wasilij Nikitin	
2016	Suicide Squad	Rick Flag	
2016	Edge of Winter	Elliot Baker	
2019	The Informer	Pete Koslow	
2020	Brothers by Blood	Michael Flood	
2020	The Secrets We Keep	Thomas Steinman	
2021	The Suicide Squad	Rick Flag	
2023	Sympathy for the Devil	The Driver / David Chamberlain / James Levine	
2023	Silent Night	Brian Godlock	Also executive producer
2024	The Silent Hour	Detective Frank Shaw	
2025	Icefall	Harlan	
2026	The Beast †	Agent Taft	

=== Television ===
Key
†	Denotes television productions that have not yet been released

Year	Title	Role	Notes
1990–1991	Storstad	Felix Lundström	33 episodes, Swedish TV series; Credited as Joe Nordström
2006	Vinnarskallar	Gurra	Swedish TV series
2008	Andra Avenyn	Gustav	2 episodes (#1.62 and #1.64), Swedish TV series
2009	183 dagar	Byron	3 episodes, Swedish TV series
2011–2014	The Killing	Stephen Holder	44 episodes
2016–2017	House of Cards	William "Will" Conway	15 episodes (seasons 4–5)
2018–2020	Altered Carbon	Takeshi Kovacs / Elias Ryker	11 episodes
2019–2021	Hanna	Erik Heller	12 episodes
2019–2026	For All Mankind	Edward Baldwin	Lead role (seasons 1–5); 43 episodes
2021	In Treatment	Adam	8 episodes (season 4)
2025	Peacemaker	Rick Flag Jr., Rick Flag Jr. (Earth–X)	Episode: "Another Rick Up My Sleeve" (uncredited)
2026	Jo Nesbø's Detective Hole	Tom Waaler	Main role; 9 episodes
2026	Imperfect Women	Robert	Main role; 8 episodes
2026	High Value Target: The Hunt for Saddam	John Nixon	Lead role; 8 episodes
TBA	Bishop †	Bishop Graves	Lead role
TBA	The Husbands †	TBA	Main role

== Awards and nominations ==
Awards and nominations received by Joel Kinnaman
Year	Award	Category	Nominated work	Result	Ref.
2009	Såstaholms pris till Höstsols minne	—N/a	—N/a	Won	
2009	Guldbagge Awards	Best Actor in a Supporting Role	Johan Falk – Gruppen för särskilda insatser	Nominated	
2011	Guldbagge Awards	Best Actor in a Leading Role	Easy Money	Won	
2012	Saturn Award	Best Supporting Actor on Television	The Killing	Nominated	
2022	Saturn Award	Best Supporting Actor on Television (Streaming)	For All Mankind	Nominated	
