= Dejan Čukić =

Serbian-Danish actor

- Дејан Чукић
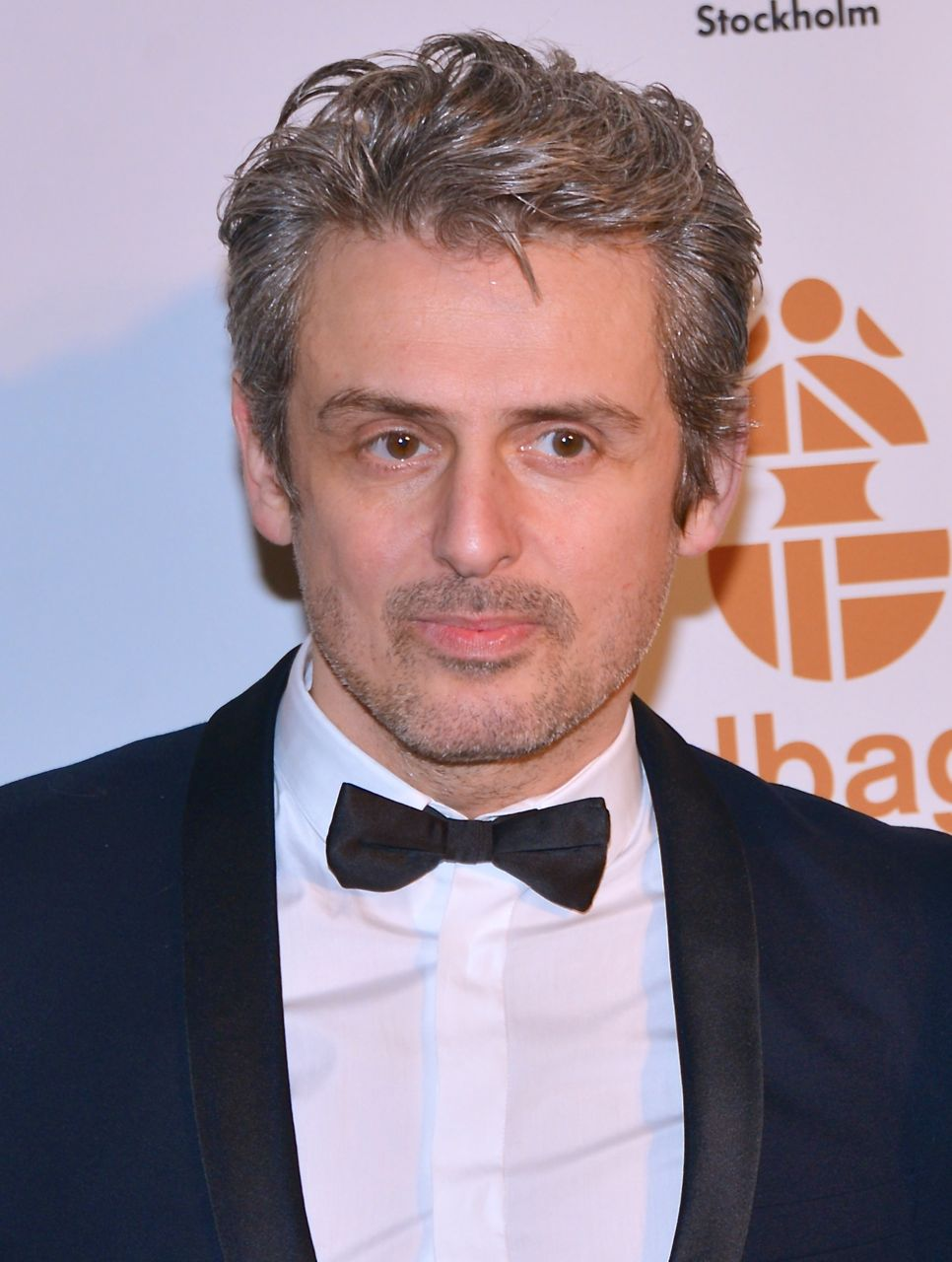
- Dejan Cukic at the Guldbagge Awards
- Born: 25 November 1966 (age 59); Ivangrad, SR Montenegro, SFR Yugoslavia
- Occupation: Actor
- Years active: 1993–present

Dejan Čukić (Serbian Cyrillic: Дејан Чукић; born 25 November 1966) is a Montenegrin-Danish actor. He appeared in the Wallander TV film series as Lars in The Ghost, based on the novel by Henning Mankell. He also played Cardinal Giulano della Rovere in the TV drama series Borgia.

== Selected filmography ==
Year	Film	Role	Notes
2026	Home (Danish: Hjem)	Marko	
2018–19	Berlin Station	Kolya Akulov	TV series
2013	Circles (Serbian: Krugovi)	Rade	
2011–14	Borgia	Cardinal Giuliano della Rovere / Pope Julius II	TV series
2010	Easy Money (Swedish: Snabba Cash)	Radovan Kranjic	
2008	Ulvenatten	Jimmy Wallace	
2007	Erik Nietzsche - de Unge år	Selkoff	
2007	Just Another Love Story		
2007	Daisy Diamond	Bettina	
2007	Torpedo	Čedomir	(mini) TV Series
2007	Klopka	Petar Ivković	
2006	The Amazing død fru Müller	Tango	
2006	Anna Pihl	Stavro	6 episodes
2006	Snart kommer Tiden	Hilbert	TV
2005	Drengen og træet	Far	
2005	Bag Det stille Ydre	David	
2005	Opbrud	Gustav	
2004	Hotet	Jacek	
2003	Skjulte Spor	Haak	2 episodes
2003	Nikolaj og Julie	Philip	22 episodes, 2002–2003
2003	Hvem er den største	Nyheter Reader	
2002	Hvor svært Kan Det seg å være	Carsten	1 episode
2002	Den Gamle Møller	Kulturgangster III	
2001	D-dag - Den færdige	Boris	TV
2001	Den Serbiske dansker	Vuk (Ratko)	TV
2001	Escape - Flugten fra ensomheden		
2000	D-dag - Boris	Boris	TV
2000	D-dag - Carl	Boris	TV
2000	D-dag	Boris	
2000	D-dag - Lise	Boris	TV
2000	D-dag - Niels-Henning	Boris	
1999	In China They Eat Dogs (Danish: I Kina Spiser de Hunde)	Arvid	
1996	Ondt blod	Salto	
1996	Bella, min Bella	Drago	
1995	Landsbyen	Simon	
1995	Operasjon Cobra	Zak	
1993	En Suksess		TV
