= Daniel Espinosa =

Swedish filmmaker (born 1977)

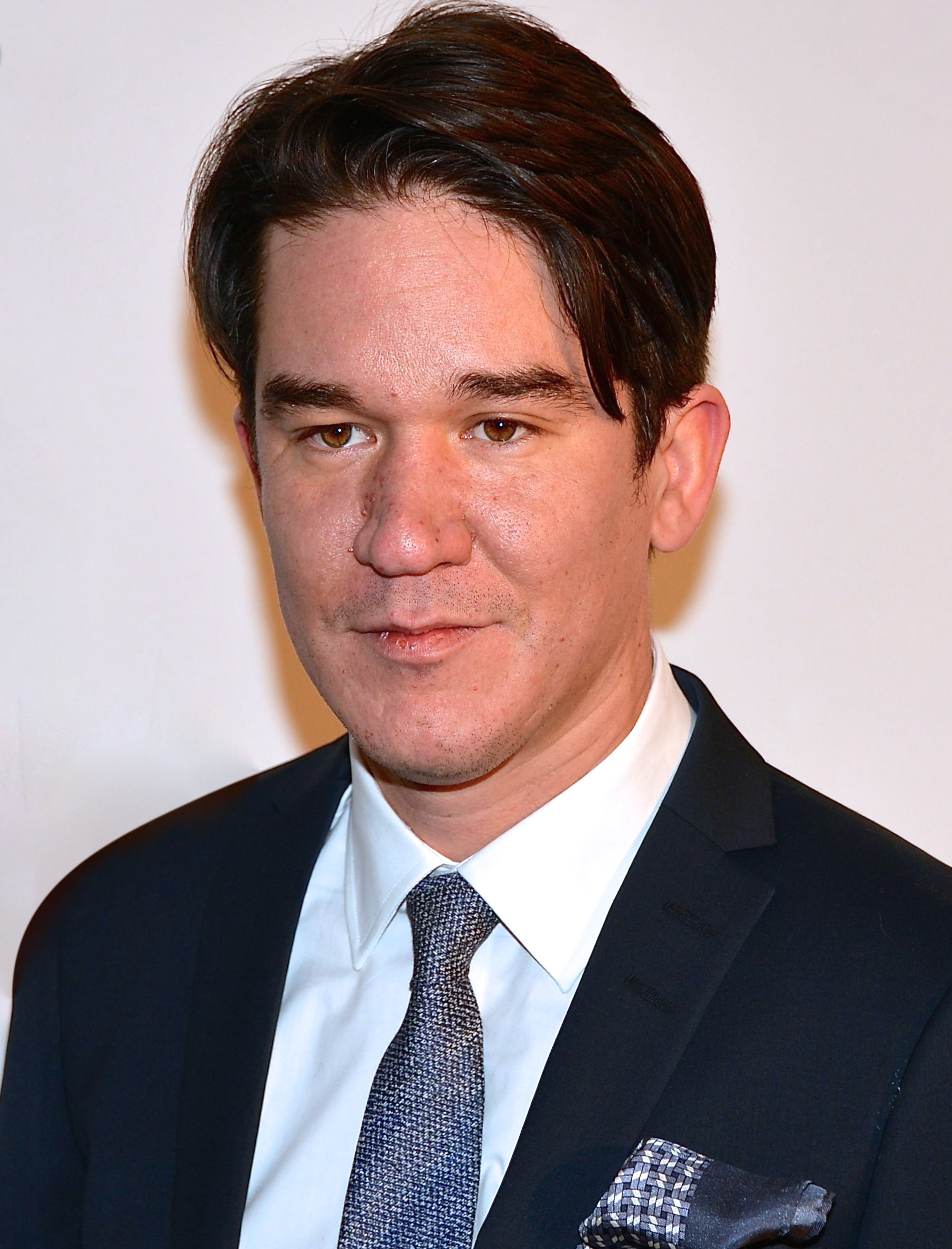
- Espinosa in 2013
- Born: Jorge Daniel Espinosa; 23 March 1977 (age 49); Stockholm, Sweden
- Education: Sigtunaskolan Humanistiska Läroverket; National Film School of Denmark
- Occupation: Film director
- Years active: 2000–present
- Spouse: Gabriella Borbely

Jorge Daniel Espinosa (born 23 March 1977) is a Swedish film director.

== Early life and education ==
Espinosa was born in Stockholm in 1977. His Chilean parents emigrated to Sweden after the 1973 Chilean coup d'état led by Augusto Pinochet. Espinosa spent his early childhood in several African countries, before his parents separated and his mother brought him back to Sweden. He was raised in the Skogås district of the Huddinge Municipality of Stockholm County.

Espinosa recalled having a difficult childhood and being jailed in a juvenile detention center at age 17. At the suggestion of a court psychologist, he was enrolled in the Sigtunaskolan Humanistiska Läroverket boarding school, which he credits with spurring his interest in filmmaking. He then attended the National Film School of Denmark and graduated in 2003.

== Career ==
His third feature film, Easy Money, was the Swedish film with the most admissions in Sweden in 2010. Espinosa was in talks about directing the film adaptation of Assassin's Creed but was ultimately replaced by Justin Kurzel.

Safe House in 2012 was Espinosa's debut directing an English-language film. Reviews were mixed, but Safe House was a financial success.

He also directed the critically panned Sony's Spider-Man Universe film Morbius (2022).

His 2024 film Madame Luna was nominated for Best Nordic Film at the Gothenburg Film Festival. The same year, he co-directed the miniseries The Helicopter Heist.

== Filmography ==
=== Film ===
Year	Title	Notes
2003	Bokseren	Student short film
2004	Babylonsjukan	
2007	Uden for kærligheden	
2010	Easy Money	
2012	Safe House	
2015	Child 44	
2017	Life	
2022	Morbius	
2024	Madame Luna	Also writer

=== Television ===
Year	Title	Notes
2010	Den fördömde	Episode #1.1
2024	The Helicopter Heist	Miniseries

== Awards and nominations ==
Institution	Year	Category	Work	Result
Brussels International Film Festival	2005	Golden Iris	Babylonsjukan	Nominated
Golden Raspberry Awards	2023	Worst Director	Morbius	Nominated
Gothenburg Film Festival	2024	Best Nordic Film	Madame Luna	Nominated
Guldbagge Awards	2010	Audience Award	Easy Money	Nominated
International Filmfestival Mannheim-Heidelberg	2007	Prize of the Ecumenical Jury	Uden for kærligheden	Won
Palm Springs International Film Festival	2011	Directors to Watch	Easy Money	Won
Tallinn Black Nights Film Festival	2003	Best Fiction Film	Bokseren	Won
Warsaw Film Festival	2007	Warsaw Award	Uden for kærligheden	Nominated
