= List of Swedish films of the 2010s =

This is a list of films produced in Sweden and in the Swedish language in the 2010s.

== 2010s ==
Swedish title	English title	Director	Cast	Genre	Notes
2010
Änglavakt		Johan Brisinger	Ewa Fröling, Tchéky Karyo, Michael Nyqvist, Izabella Scorupco	Drama	
Himlen är oskyldigt blå		Hannes Holm	Peter Dalle, Björn Kjellman, Bill Skarsgård	Comedy, drama	
Luftslottet som sprängdes	The Girl Who Kicked the Hornets' Nest	Daniel Alfredson	Noomi Rapace, Michael Nyqvist	Thriller	
Madness		Sonny Laguna, David Liljeblad, Tommy Wiklund	Max Wallmo, Yohanna Idha, Andreas Vaehi, Victoria Bloom	Horror	
Sebbe	Sebbe	Babak Najafi	Sebastian Hiort af Ornäs, Eva Melander, Kenny Wåhlbrink	Drama	
Snabba Cash	Easy Money	Daniel Espinosa	Joel Kinnaman, Matias Varela, Dragomir Mrsic	Thriller	
Svinalängorna	Beyond	Pernilla August	Noomi Rapace, Ville Virtanen	Drama	Winner of the Nordic Council Film Prize (2011)
Till det som är vackert	Pure	Lisa Langseth	Alicia Vikander, Samuel Fröler	Drama	
Dragonetti: The Ruthless Contract Killer		Jonas Wolcher	Aldo Cunei, Johan Westergren	Horror	
2011
Apflickorna	She Monkeys	Lisa Aschan	Mathilda Paradeiser, Linda Molin, Isabella Lindqvist	Drama	
The Girl with the Dragon Tattoo	The Girl with the Dragon Tattoo	David Fincher	Daniel Craig, Rooney Mara	Thriller	Co-produced with the US, UK and Germany
Gränsen	Beyond the Border	Richard Holm	André Sjöberg, Antti Reini, Bjørn Sundquist	War drama	
Jägarna 2	False Trail	Kjell Sundvall	Peter Stormare, Rolf Lassgård	Thriller	
Kronjuvelerna	The Crown Jewels	Ella Lemhagen	Timbuktu, Loa Falkman, Björn Gustafsson, Bill Skarsgård, Tomas von Brömssen		
Marianne	Marianne	Filip Tegstedt	Peter Stormare, Thomas Hedengran	Horror	
Misterioso		Harald Hamrell	Shanti Roney	Drama	
Play	Play	Ruben Östlund		Drama	Winner of the Nordic Council Film Prize (2012)
Stockholm Östra	Stockholm East	Simon Kaijser	Mikael Persbrandt	Drama	
Svensson, Svensson - i nöd och lust		Leif Lindblom	Allan Svensson, Suzanne Reuter, Peter Dalle, Torkel Petersson	Comedy	
The Stig-Helmer Story	The Stig-Helmer Story	Lasse Åberg	Lasse Åberg, Jon Skolmen	Comedy	
2012
Äta sova dö	Eat Sleep Die	Gabriela Pichler	Nermina Lukac, Milan Dragišić	Drama	
Call Girl	Call Girl	Mikael Marcimain	Sofia Karemyr, Simon J. Berger, Josefin Asplund, Pernilla August, David Dencik	Drama	
En fiende att dö för	An Enemy to Die For	Peter Dalle	Axel Prahl, Richard Ulfsäter, Jeanette Hain	Thriller	
Hamilton – I nationens intresse	Hamilton: In the Interest of the Nation	Kathrine Windfeld	Mikael Persbrandt, Saba Mubarak, Pernilla August	Thriller	
Hamilton 2: Men inte om det gäller din dotter	Agent Hamilton - But Not if it Concerns Your Daughter	Tobias Falk	Mikael Persbrandt, Saba Mubarak, Frida Hallgren	Thriller	
2013
Återträffen	The Reunion	Anna Odell	Sandra Andreis	Drama	
Hundraåringen som klev ut genom fönstret och försvann	The Hundred-Year-Old Man Who Climbed Out of the Window and Disappeared	Felix Herngren	Robert Gustafsson	Comedy	
2014
En andra chans	A Second Chance	Susanne Bier	Nikolaj Coster-Waldau, Ulrich Thomsen, Maria Bonnevie, Nikolaj Lie Kaas, Lykke May Andersen	Thriller	
Before I Go to Sleep	Before I Go to Sleep	Rowan Joffé	Nicole Kidman, Colin Firth, Mark Strong, Anne-Marie Duff, Dean-Charles Chapman	Thriller	
En duva satt på en gren och funderade på tillvaron	A Pigeon Sat on a Branch Reflecting on Existence	Roy Andersson	Nisse Vestblom, Holger Andersson	Comedy; Drama	
Dyke Hard	Dyke Hard	Bitte Andersson	Lina Kurttila	Comedy	
Fasanjägarna	The Absent One	Mikkel Nørgaard	Nikolaj Lie Kaas, Fares Fares, Pilou Asbæk, Sarah-Sofie Boussnina, Danica Curcic	Crime; Mystery; Thriller	
Faust 2.0	Faust 2.0	Nicolas Debot, Micke Engström, Allan Gustafsson, Johannes Pinter, Robert Selin	Thomas Hedengran	Horror	
The Fen	The Fen	Daniel Garptoft	Charles Patrick Andersson, Simon Hultbrand, Gunnar Johansson	Horror	
Gentlemen	Gentlemen	Mikael Marcimain	David Dencik, Ruth Vega Fernandez, Sverrir Gudnason, David Fukamachi Regnfors	Drama	
En iskall jävel	In Order of Disappearance	Hans Petter Moland	Stellan Skarsgård	Action; Comedy	
Krakel Spektakel		Elisabet Gustafsson	Lea Stojanov, Vanja Blomkvist, Anton Lundqvist	Family	
Lucia de B.	Accused	Paula van der Oest	Ariane Schluter	Drama	
Nirbashito	Nirbashito	Churni Ganguly		Biography; Drama	India-Sweden coproduction
Revolten	White God	Kornél Mundruczó	Zsófia Psotta	Drama	
The Salvation	The Salvation	Kristian Levring	Mads Mikkelsen, Eva Green, Eric Cantona, Mikael Persbrandt, Jeffrey Dean Morgan, Jonathan Pryce, Michael Raymond-James	Western	
Star Wars: Threads of Destiny	Star Wars: Threads of Destiny	Rasmus Tirzitis	Patrik Hont, Carolina Neurath, Karl Lindqvist, Andreas Rylander, Karl Winden, Pale Olofsson, Sabinje von Gaffke, Anders Menzinsky	Fan	
Sune i fjällen	The Anderssons Rock the Mountains	Gustaf Åkerblom	Morgan Alling, Anja Lunqvist, William Ringström	Comedy; Family	
Turist	Force Majeure	Ruben Östlund	Johannes Kuhnke, Lisa Loven Kongsli, Clara Wettergren, Vincent Wettergren, Kristofer Hivju, Fanni Metelius	Drama	
2015
Alena	Alena	Daniel di Grado	Amalia Holm Bjelket, Felice Jankell, Rebecka Nyman	Horror	Based on the graphic novel Alena
En man som heter Ove	A Man Called Ove	Hannes Holm	Rolf Lassgård, Bahar Pars, Filip Berg	Comedy-Drama	
2016
Sameblod	Sami Blood	Amanda Kernell	Lene Cecilia Sparrok	Drama	
2017
The Square	The Square	Ruben Östlund		Drama	
Borg vs. McEnroe	Borg vs. McEnroe			Drama	
2018
