= The Score (1978 film) =

- Directed by: Christer Dahl
- Written by: Lasse Strömstedt; Christer Dahl; Anders Lön; Bodil Mårtensson
- Produced by: Bo Jonsson
- Starring: Anders Lönnbro; Bodil Mårtensson; Roland Janson; Weiron Holmberg; Pale Olofsson
- Cinematography: Anders Barréus
- Edited by: Lasse Strömstedt; Christer Dahl; Anders Lön
- Music by: Christer Boustedt; Bernt Andersson; Kjell Jansson; Conny Sjökvist
- Distributed by: Europa Film; SF
- Release date: 20 January 1978
- Running time: 117 minutes
- Country: Sweden
- Language: Swedish

The Score (Swedish: Lyftet) is a 1978 Swedish crime film, based on the Kennet Ahl (Lasse Strömstedt/Christer Dahl) novel with the same name. The film deals with different themes such as drug addiction, institutionalisation, and the Swedish criminal justice system. This was Peter Stormare's screen debut.

== Plot ==
Kennet, a drug addict and incorrigible petty criminal, longs to even 'the score', which is not in his favour.

== Cast ==
- Anders Lönnbro as Kennet Ahl, the main protagonist.
- Bodil Mårtensson as Karin Åberg
- Carl-Axel Heiknert as Oskar Åberg, Karin's father
- Siv Ericks as Linnéa Åberg, Karin's mother
- Pale Olofsson as "Varan"
- Roland Janson as "Eleganten"
- Weiron Holmberg as Curt Storm
- Sten Ljunggren as "Bromsbandet"
- Roland Hedlund as "Sundsvalls-Jesus"
- Lasse Strömstedt as Douglas Andersson
- Bo Högberg as "Roten"
- Lena Lindgren as Vera Lind
- Anders Granström as Piketen leader
- Bernt Ström as Union leader
- Peter Stormare as a prisoner

== Accolades ==
Anders Lönnbro won the award for Best Actor at the 14th Guldbagge Awards for his role as Kennet Ahl.
