= Carolina Neurath =

Swedish journalist and writer

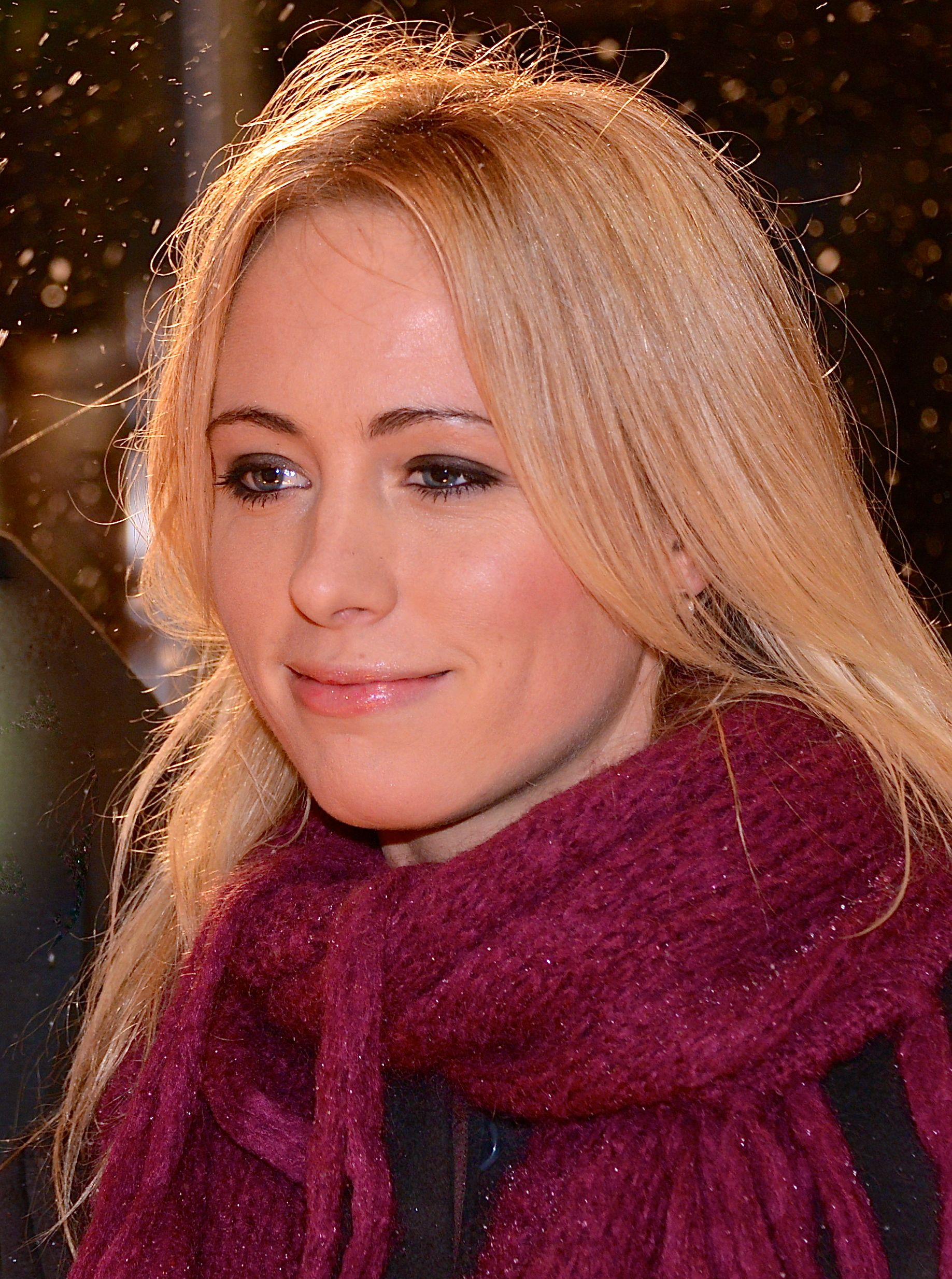
- Neurath at a film premiere in Filmstaden in December 2012
- Born: Anna Carolina Neurath; 17 November 1985 (age 40); Segeltorp, Huddinge, Sweden
- Education: Stockholm University; Poppius Journalistskola
- Occupations: Journalist, writer

Anna Carolina Neurath (born 17 November 1985) is a Swedish journalist and writer. She specializes in writing business articles for the newspaper Svenska Dagbladet. In 2016 her first work of fiction, Fartblinda, was published.

== Personal life ==
Neurath was born in 1985. She studied journalism at the Stockholm University Department of Journalism, Media, and Communication (JMK) and then at Poppius Journalistskola.

She married in 2017 and has one child (born 2014).

== Career ==
Neurath began her career as a reporter for the business newspaper Dagens Industri. She served as an editor on the Placera.nu website. In 2011, Neurath published Den stora bankhärvan: Finansparet Hagströmer och Qvibergs uppgång och fall, a book depicting the rise and fall of HQ Bank and the reasons for its failure.

On 19 July 2013, Neurath made a guest appearance as a "Sommarpratare" ("Summer Presenter") in the Sveriges Radio show Sommar i P1. She also participated in SVT's Sommarpratarna in October 2014.

In 2014, Neurath released her second book, De svenska riskkapitalisterna (The Swedish Venture Capitalists), co-authored by Jan Almgren. The same year, Neurath's history of acting became news when the low budget fan film Star Wars: Threads of Destiny premiered, including 2006 footage of Neurath as Princess Arianna Ad'lah.

Her third book is her first work of fiction: a 2016 finance thriller called Fartblinda where a young female finance journalist attempts to uncover the business of shady financiers. The rights for a TV series has been bought by FLX, a production company known for Felix Herngrens involvement.

== Awards ==
Neurath has received various awards for her work. In 2010, she and a Svenska Dagbladet colleague, Jacob Bursell, were presented with the Guldspaden journalism award in the Larger Newspapers category for their coverage of the Swedish auditing industry.

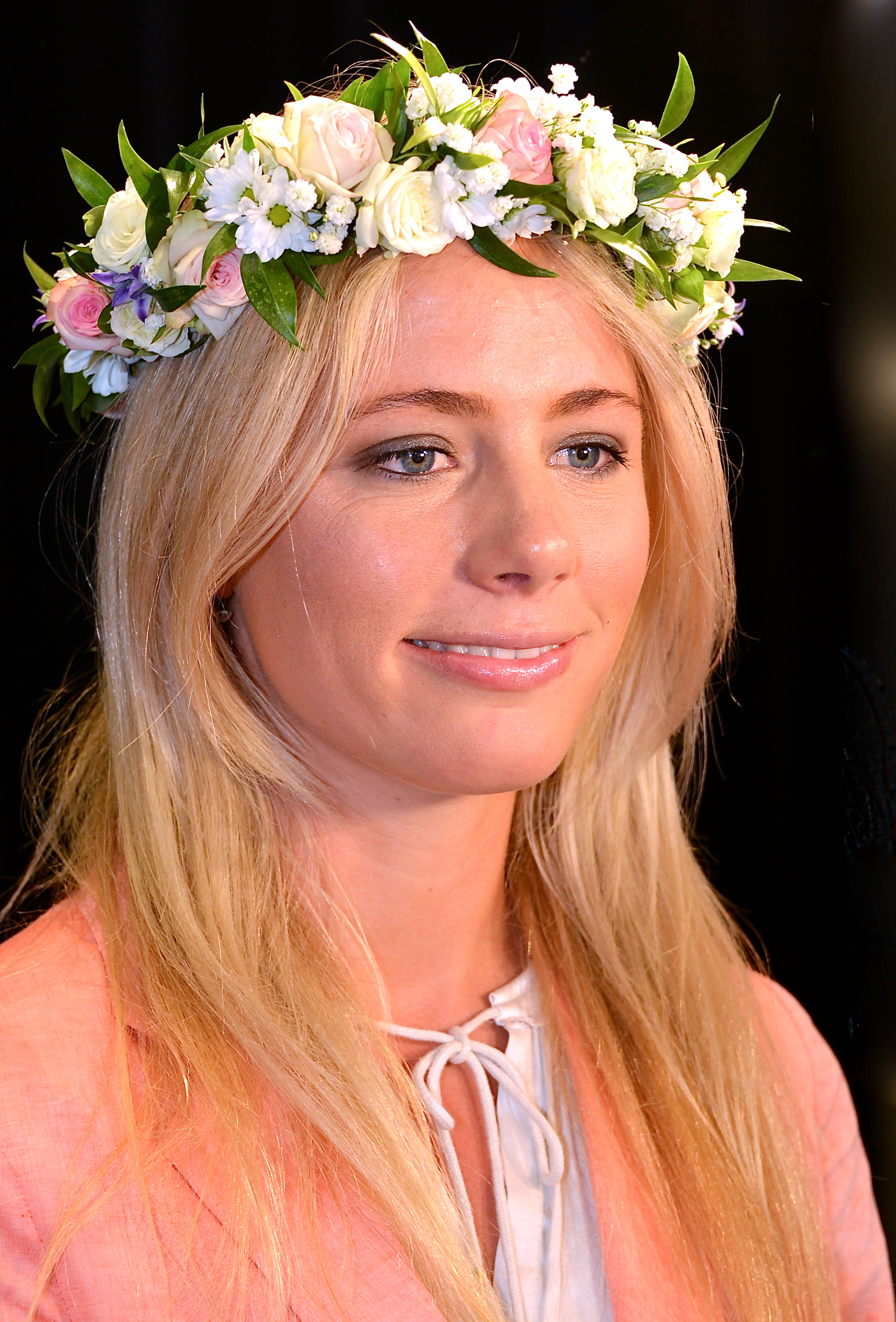
Carolina Neurath at the presentation of the hosts for Sommar i P1 on 29 May 2013

In 2011, Neurath was nominated for a second Guldspaden award for her book Den stora bankhärvan: Finansparet Hagströmer och Qvibergs uppgång och fall, but did not win.

The same year, Neurath was named one of "Sweden's Supertalents" by the newspaper Veckans Affärer; the Shortcut magazine included her on its list, "Årets uppstickare" ("Newcomer of the Year"). She was also named "Woman of the Year" by the newspaper Expressen.

In 2012, Neurath was awarded the Stora Journalistpriset for her work on the interest rate map. She was also named Sweden's best business journalist by the public relations firm Halvarsson & Halvarsson in their yearly review of the financial market.

In July 2013, Neurath was given the title "Powermama" of the year by the magazine Mama. Additionally, she was named one of the world's best investigative journalists by the international Monocle magazine.

In 2014, Neurath was also awarded the Per Wendel-pris for her work in journalism, which came with a prize of 100,000 SEK.

== Works ==
- Den stora bankhärvan: finansparet Hagströmer och Qvibergs uppgång och fall Stockholm: Norstedt, 2011. Print. ISBN 9789113036984
- De svenska riskkapitalisterna: en berättelse om makt, pengar och hemligheter Stockholm: Norstedt, 2014. Print. ISBN 9789113055787
- Fartblinda Stockholm: Piratförlaget, 2016. Print. ISBN 9789164204752
