= Yohanna Idha =

Swedish actress (born 1978)

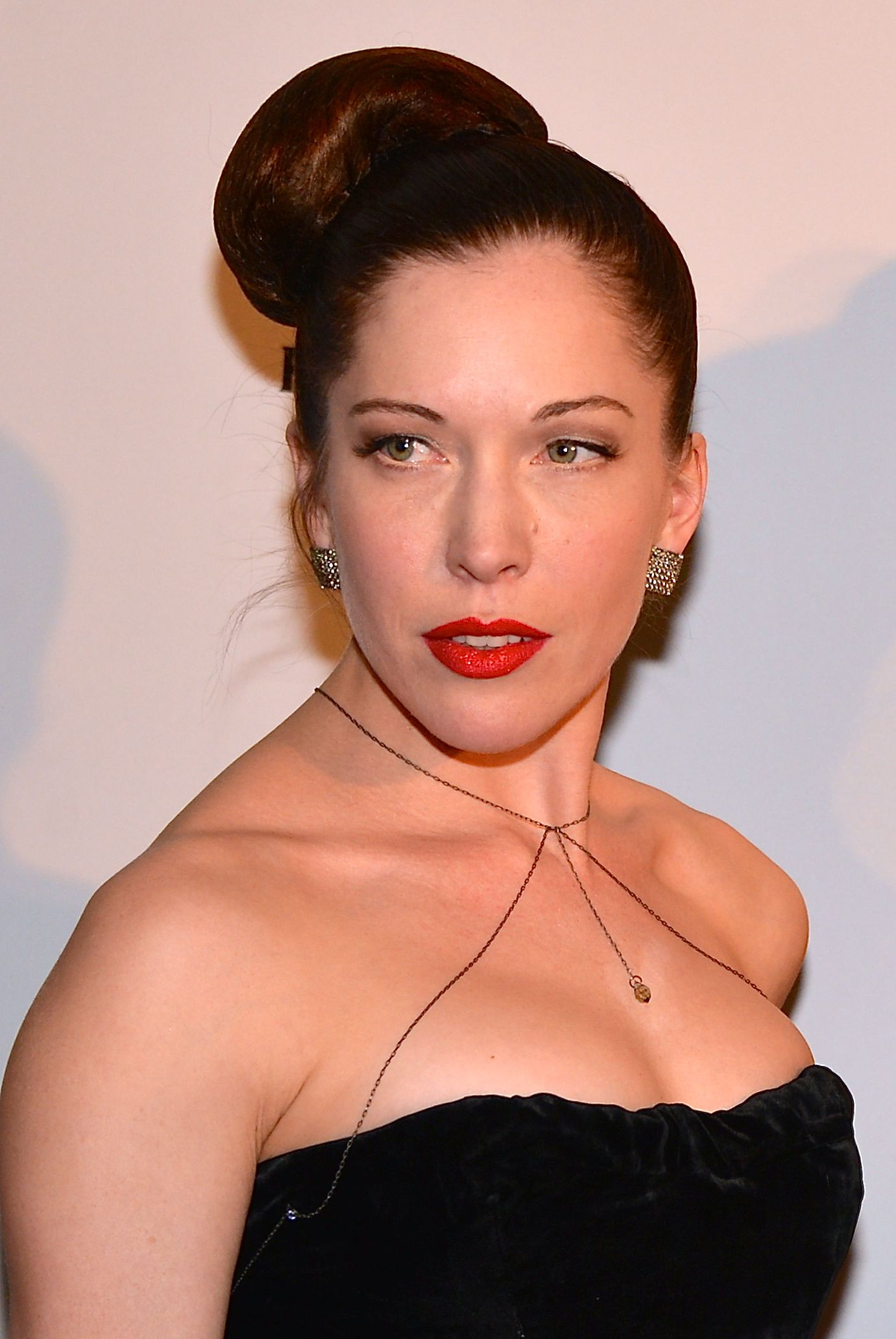
- Idha in 2013
- Born: 1978 (age 46–47); Eskilstuna, Sweden
- Occupation: Actress

Yohanna Idha (born 1978) is a Swedish actress. She was nominated for a Guldbagge Award in 2013 for her role as Linda in the film Katinkas kalas. In 2011 she was nominated to the Lóreal Paris Rising Star award 2011.

Idha was born and raised in Eskilstuna.

== Roles (selection) ==
- Molly i världen (2003)
- Kärringen därnere (2006)
- Beck – Den japanska shungamålningen (2007)
- Gangster (2007)
- Död vid ankomst (2008)
- Wallander (2008)
- The Horror Vault 2 (2009)
- Madness (2010)
- Himlen är oskyldigt blå (2010)
- Angry (2010),
- Katinkas kalas (2011)
- Äkta människor (2012)
- Star Wars: Threads of Destiny (2014)
- 'melsas värld (2013)
- Vilsen (film) (2015)
- boymachine (2015)
