= Shortcut =

Shortcut may refer to:

== Navigation ==
- Rat running or shortcut, a minor-road alternative —used by motorists— to a signposted route
- File shortcut, a handle which allows the user to find a file or resource located in a different directory or folder on a computer
- Keyboard shortcut, a combination of keystrokes that provides easier access to a command or operation

== Film ==
- Shortcut (2015 film), a Bollywood film about cybercrime
- Shortcut (2020 film), an Italian horror film
- The Shortcut, a 2009 US film
- Shortcuts, also known as Cutting It Short, a 1981 film directed by Jirí Menzel

== Other uses ==
- Shortcut (magazine), a Swedish magazine
- Shortcut (software), project management software
- Shortcuts (comics), a syndicated comics page feature
- Shortcuts (app), a scripting application for iOS

== See also ==
- Shortkut, a 2009 Bollywood film
- Short Cut (disambiguation)
