= Simon Irvine =

Swedish-English gardener and author (born 1952)

Simon Richard Gower Irvine (born 15 April 1952) is a Swedish-English gardener and author. Irvine presented the Sveriges Radio show Sommar i P1 on 17 August 1999.
