= Love Hurts (disambiguation) =

"Love Hurts" is a song by Boudleaux Bryant, first recorded by The Everly Brothers, and covered by Nazareth, Gram Parsons, Cher, and other artists.

Love Hurts may refer to:

== Music ==
- Love Hurts (Cher album), 1991
  - Love Hurts Tour, a tour for the album above
- Love Hurts (Elaine Paige album), 1985
- Love Hurts (Jon B. album)
- Love Hurts (Julian Lage album), 2019
- "Love Hurts" (Incubus song), 2008
- "Love Hurts", by Suzi Quatro from the album Suzi ... and Other Four Letter Words
- "Love Hurts", by Tynisha Keli
- "Love Hurts", by Playboi Carti featuring Travis Scott from the album Die Lit

== Film ==
- Love Hurts (1990 film), directed by Bud Yorkin
- Love Hurts (1993 film), a Dutch film
- Love Hurts (2009 film), directed by Barra Grant
- Love Hurts (2025 film), a film directed by Jonathan Eusebio

== Television ==
- Love Hurts (TV series), a British series
- "Love Hurts" (Brooklyn South), a 1997 episode
- "Love Hurts" (Charmed), a 1999 episode
- "Love Hurts" (Doctors), a 2003 episode
- "Love Hurts" (House), a 2005 episode
- "Love Hurts" (NCIS: New Orleans), a 2014 episode

== Literature ==
- Love Hurts (graphic novel), a Swedish graphic novel by Kim W. Andersson
