= Clubhouse =

Clubhouse may refer to:

== Locations ==
- A building which serves as the headquarters of:
  - A club (organization), an association of two or more people united by a common interest or goal
  - In the United States, a country club
  - In the United Kingdom, a gentlemen's club
- A Wendy house, or playhouse, a small house for children to play in
- The locker room or changing room for a sports team, which at the highest professional level also features eating and entertainment facilities
- A community centre, a public location where community members gather for group activities, social support, public information, and other purposes

== Film and TV ==
- "Clubhouses" (South Park), a season 2 South Park episode
- Clubhouse (TV series), an American drama television series from 2004
- Mickey Mouse Clubhouse, a Playhouse Disney TV series from 2006

== Music ==
- Club house music, a form of house music played in nightclubs
- Club House (band), an Italian dance-music band
- Clubhouse (album), a Dexter Gordon album

== Other ==
- Clubhouse Games, or 42 All-Time Classics, a compilation game for the Nintendo DS
- Clubhouse Model of Psychosocial Rehabilitation, a program of support and opportunities for people with severe and persistent mental illnesses
- Clubhouse sandwich
- Clubhouse (app), a mobile audio-chat social networking app
- Clubhouse Software, the former name of the company Shortcut Software
