= Tegstedt =

Tegstedt is a Swedish surname. Notable people with the surname include:

- Filip Tegstedt (born 1978), Swedish film director
- Frida Tegstedt (born 1987), Swedish handball player
