= Midsommarkrans =

Floral wreath worn during Swedish Midsummer

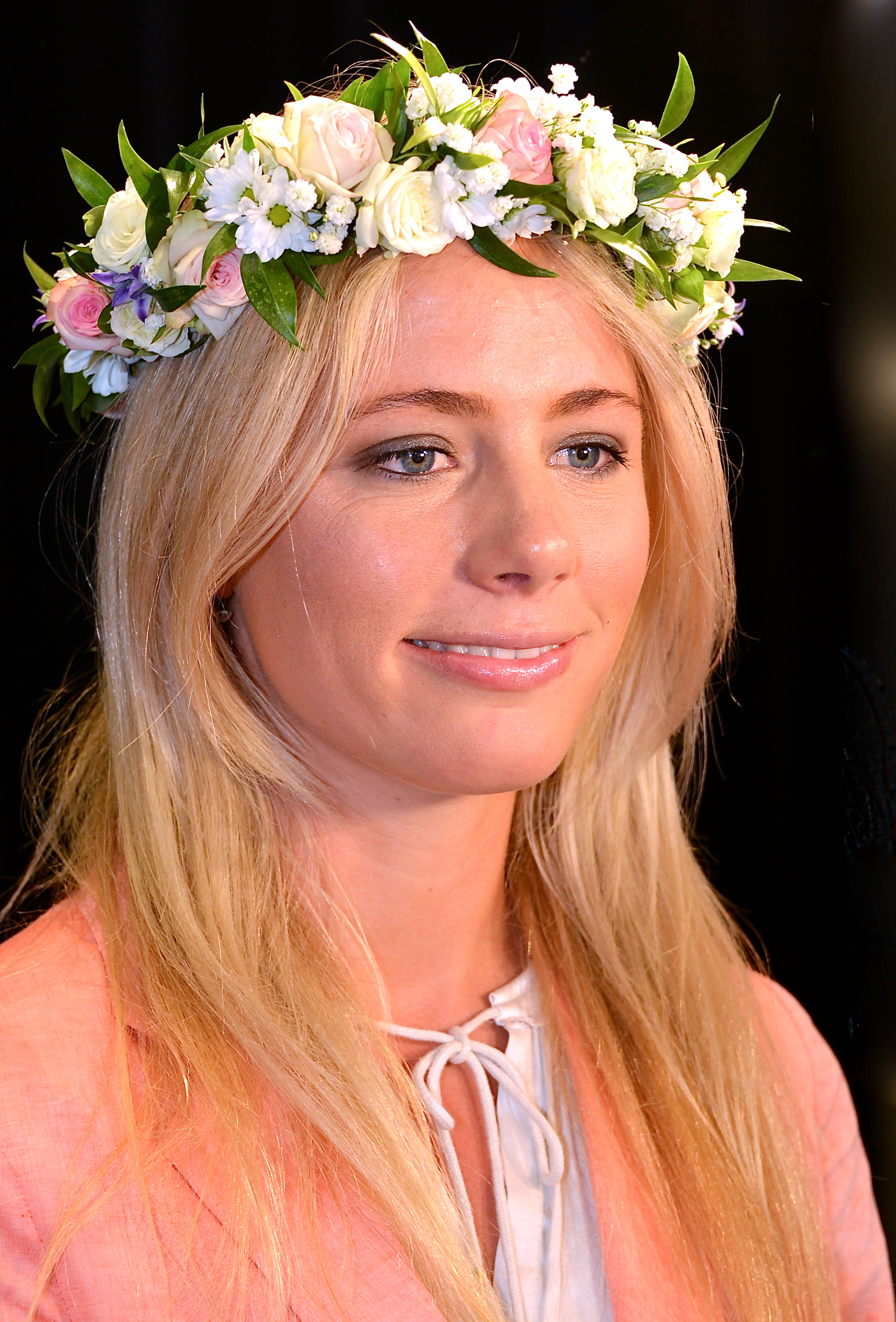
Carolina Neurath wearing a midsommarkrans.

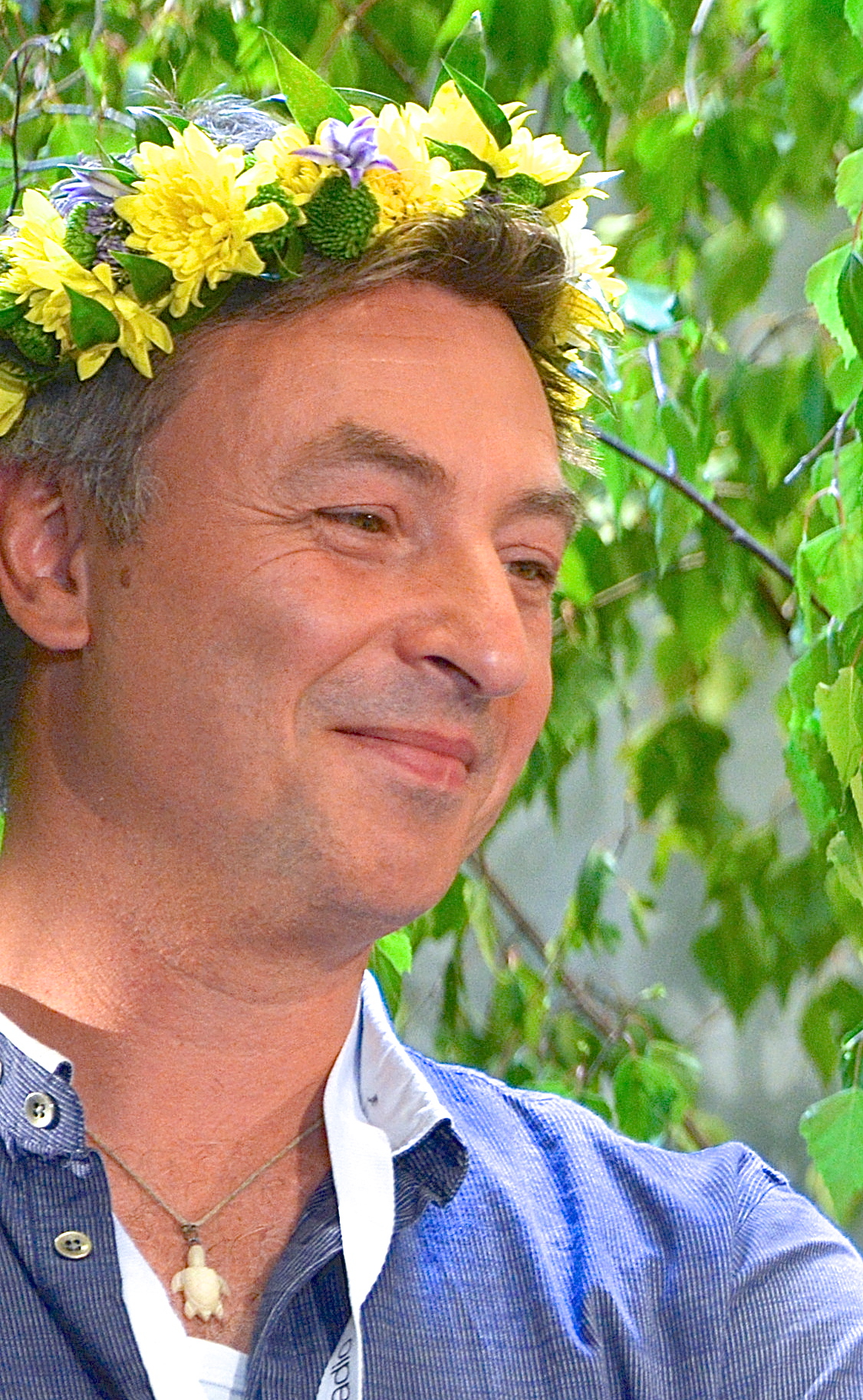
Tareq Taylor wearing a midsommarkrans.

A midsommarkrans (Swedish for 'Midsummer wreath') is a wreath made of flowers and leaves. A midsommarkrans is usually worn during the Midsummer celebrations in Sweden. It is the traditional headgear of a Sommar i P1 host during the presentation show in early June.
