= Christer Dahl =

Swedish director, script writer, and producer

- Born: 30 December 1940

Christer Dahl (born 30 December 1940) is a Swedish director, script writer, producer, and novelist. He was born and grew up in Solna outside Stockholm.

Together with Lasse Strömstedt (1935-2009) they wrote six crime novels together using the pseudonym Kennet Ahl.
