= Liliane Carlberg =

Swedish TV producer

- Born: 28 December 1936; Stockholm County, Sweden
- Died: 4 February 2024 (aged 87)
- Known for: television producer

Liliane Gunhild Margareta Karlberg (née Ekman; born 28 December 1936 – 4 February 2024), known as Liliane Carlberg, was a Swedish television producer.

Carlberg was the daughter of an engineer. After being secretary first to Henrik Hahr and then to Per-Martin Hamberg, she became a scriptwriter and all in the TV programme Söndagsbilagan in 1959.

She was then active in the news and entertainment departments at later Sveriges Television. She produced programmes such as Fri entré 1967–1968, From Boston to Pop 1978 and did the final editing for the Lykkeland series in the 1980s. In 1986, she left SVT to start the company Newsmakers together with Bo Holmström, in which, in addition to the TV program Listan (1987), she produced films and videos for industries.

Liliane Carlberg was from 1963 married to the musician and TV producer Sten Carlberg (1925–1998). She inherited the rights to the signature tune of Sommar i P1, "Sommar, sommar, sommar", which the husband had done.

Carlberg died on 4 February 2024, at the age of 87.
