= The Cabin =

2018 film by Johan Bodell

- Poster
- Directed by: Johan Bodell
- Written by: Erik Kammerland
- Produced by: Johan Bodell; Alec Trachtenberg
- Starring: Christopher Lee Page; Caitlin Crommett; Erik Kammerland; Thomas Hedengran
- Cinematography: Charles Doan
- Edited by: Robert Sarkanen
- Music by: Matthew Patrick Donner
- Production companies: Coast ART Productions; KW Studios
- Distributed by: High Octane Pictures
- Release date: December 4, 2018 (Video on demand)
- Running time: 86 minutes
- Countries: Sweden; United States
- Language: English

The Cabin, is a 2018 Swedish-American horror thriller film directed by Johan Bodell in his feature film debut, written by Erik Kammerland and produced by Bodell and Alec Trachtenberg. The film stars Christopher Lee Page, Caitlin Crommett, Kammerland and Thomas Hedengran. It was released through video on demand platforms.

== Plot ==
Americans Harry and Rose are in a bad relationship where they can't stop arguing. They head to rural Sweden to a cabin that is situated on a small island in the middle of a lake, a place where Harry's family had frequented for retreats. However, they are unaware that it has become the hangout for a serial-killing axe murderer named Sven.

== Cast ==
- Christopher Lee Page as Harry
- Caitlin Crommett as Rose
- Erik Kammerland as Sven
- Thomas Hedengran as Thomas

== Production ==
Filmmaker Johan Bodell and screenwriter Erik Kammerland conceived of the film where they wanted to do something with a few actors and a few locations. They used Bodell's family property near Kilafors, Sweden; his grandfather had built the cabin in the 1960s on the farm area that his aunt currently owns.

Funding for the project began on Kickstarter. The script was written by actor Erik Kammerland while the film was produced by Alec Trachtenberg. Production companies include Coast ART Productions and KW Studios. It was originally titled A Night in the Cabin, but was retitled to The Cabin when it was distributed for the U.S. It was planned to have American actors star in the film.

== Release ==
The film released for purchase and rent on video on demand and DVD on December 4, 2018, and was distributed by High Octane Pictures.

== Critical reception ==
Michael Therkelsen of the Horror Society website scored it 7.5 out of 10, stating that the "palpable mood does a lot more for the senses than a Hollywood blockbuster." Todd Martin of HorrorNews.net found the movie to be more of a thriller than a horror film; liked the acting from the main cast, and wished there were some more minor characters as fodder for the killer's body count. Anna Ace of the website PopHorror said the script could be better but it captures the "look and feel of great horror film." Norman Gidney of Film Threat wrote that it had the "potential to be a creepy Rear Window meets Cape Fear", giving it a rating of 5 out of 10.
