= Lasse Strömstedt =

Swedish writer (1935–2009)

Folke Lars-Olov Strömstedt (23 May 1935 in Gävle – 4 July 2009), better known as Lasse Strömstedt, was a Swedish writer who wrote of and about his own life in prison and drug abuse. Strömstedt was born in Gävle in 1935. He was a casual laborer whose working life was frequently disrupted by imprisonment. After 1971 he changed his life and became a writer, debater and actor. In 1974, Strömsted published his first novel, Grundbulten (The Cornerstone), written together with reporter Christer Dahl under the pseudonym Kennet Ahl. Strömstedt was married to Swedish singer and writer Ann-Christine Bärnsten. He died aged 74 of natural causes in Gränna on 4 July 2009.
