= Short Cut =

Short Cut or The Short Cut or Short Cuts may refer to:

== Books ==
- Short Cuts (manga)
- Short Cuts: Selected Stories, a 1993 compilation of stories by Raymond Carver to accompany the film Short Cuts by Robert Altman
- Short Cut, by John Denton, illustrated by Margery Gill 1980
- The Short Cut (Flaiano novel), by Ennio Flaiano 1947
- The Short Cut, by Jackson Gregory 1916
- Short Cuts, a service by Safari Books Online

== Film ==
- Short Cuts, a 1993 film directed by Robert Altman
- Short Cuts (TV series), an Australian children's television series
- Short Cut, in the List of Pakistani films of 2009

== Music ==
- "Short Cut" (song), a 2011 song by the Japanese idol group S/mileage
- "Short Cut" by Tanya Tucker, composed by Lisa MacGregor for the album Here's Some Love, 1976
- "Short Cut" by Gateway, composed by John Abercrombie for the album Homecoming, 1995

== See also ==
- Short Cuts, a radio show on BBC Radio 4 hosted by Josie Long
- "Short Cut", a season 2 episode of The Casagrandes
- Shortcut (disambiguation)
