= Magdi Abdelhadi =

Freelance writer

Magdi Abdelhadi is a freelance writer and former Arab affairs analyst for the BBC. He was born in Egypt and lived in Sweden for seventeen years before he moved to the UK. In the summer of 2007 and 2012, he presented the Sveriges Radio show Sommar i P1.
