= 14th Guldbagge Awards =

Annual Swedish film awards ceremony

- Date: 18 September 1978
- Site: Operakällaren, Stockholm, Sweden

Highlights
- Best Picture: The Adventures of Picasso

The 14th Guldbagge Awards ceremony, presented by the Swedish Film Institute, honored the best Swedish films of 1977 and 1978, and took place on 18 September 1978. The Adventures of Picasso directed by Tage Danielsson was presented with the award for Best Film.

== Awards ==
- Best Film: The Adventures of Picasso by Tage Danielsson
- Best Director: Olle Hellbom for The Brothers Lionheart
- Best Actor: Anders Lönnbro for The Score
- Best Actress: Lil Terselius for Games of Love and Loneliness
- Special Achievement: Eric M. Nilsson
- The Ingmar Bergman Award: Wic Kjellin
