= Set Poppius =

Swedish journalist (1885–1972)

Set Poppius (11 October 1885 – 10 December 1972) was a Swedish journalist. He was editor and founder of the Poppius Journalistskola in Stockholm.

== Early life ==
Poppius was the son of customs officer Erik Gabriel Poppius (1840–1907) and his wife Jenny Cecilia Poppius (1842–1916), née Hazelius. Set had six siblings, of which his older sister, the artist Minna Poppius, married the aviation baron Carl Cederström and his older brother, the agronomist Daniel Poppius, was a member of parliament.

Poppius was the son of the customs officer Erik Gabriel Poppius (1840–1907) and his wife Jenny Cecilia Poppius (1842–1916), born Hazelius. Set had six siblings, of whom his older sister, the artist Minna Poppius, married the aviation baron Carl Cederström and his older brother, the agronomist Daniel Poppius, was a member of parliament.

== Career ==
Poppius graduated from the Swedish Academy in Stockholm in 1905 and studied humanities at Uppsala University from 1905 to 1912. He was a staff member of Dagens Nyheter from 1910 to 1915, Nya Dagligt Allehanda from 1915 to 1928 and Aftonbladet from 1929 to 1934. He was press commissioner at the inauguration of the Stockholm Concert Hall in 1926.

Poppius founded the press agency Nord Press in 1935. Editor-in-chief of Skådebanan from 1942 to 1954. He founded the Poppius Journalism School in 1947 and was its principal and owner until his death. He had a good singing voice and was a member of Orphei Drängar.

Poppius studied at university to become a priest or a Christian teacher. Chance led him to the path of a newspaperman. With more than 25 years of experience in newspaper work behind him, he made a pioneering effort for journalistic education in Sweden in the years after the Second World War.

In 1923, Poppius married Ebba "Goll" Jönsson (1894–1985), who was responsible for the Poppius Journalism School's finances and administration. She was the daughter of the bank director Nils Peter Jönsson and Hilda Eufrosyne Wittsell.
