= Kim W. Andersson =

Swedish comics artist

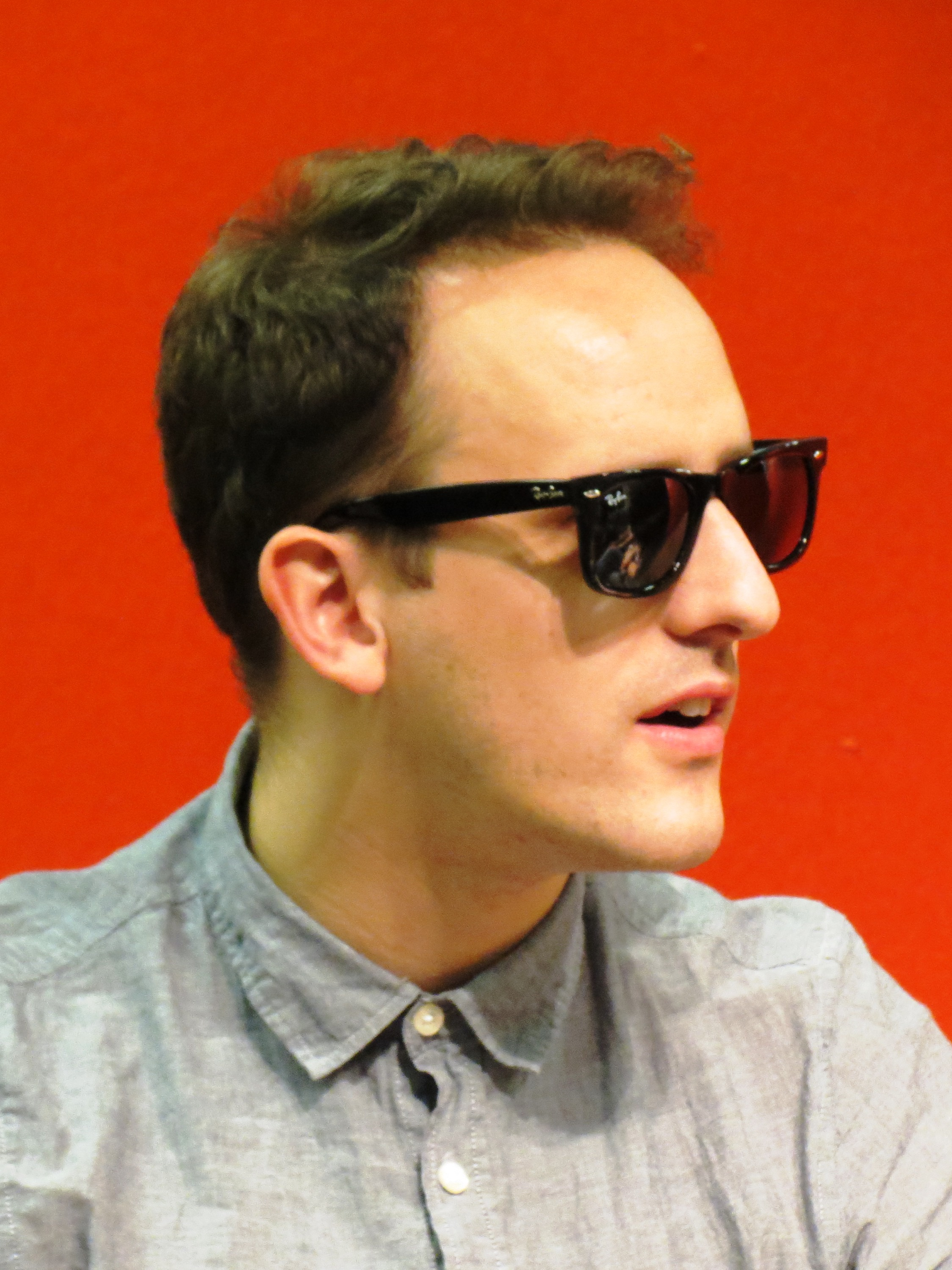
- Kim W Andersson at the 2013 Gothenburg Book Fair.
- Areas: Writer, Penciller, Inker, Colourist
- Notable works: Love Hurts; Alena
- Awards: Adamson Statue.

Kim W. Andersson is a Swedish comic book writer and artist. His works include Love Hurts and Alena, the latter of which was adapted into a Swedish film of the same name. He was the 2011 winner of the Swedish Comics Academy's Adamson statue, Sweden's most prestigious comics award.

== Bibliography ==
- Love Hurts (2009)
- Alena (2012)
- Astrid: Cult of the Volcanic Moon (2016)

== Filmography ==
- Alena (2015)
