= Games of Love and Loneliness =

1977 film

- Directed by: Anja Breien
- Written by: Per Blom; Bengt Forslund; Anja Breien
- Produced by: Bengt Forslund
- Starring: Lil Terselius
- Cinematography: Erling Thurmann-Andersen
- Release date: 29 August 1977
- Running time: 100 minutes
- Country: Sweden
- Language: Swedish

Games of Love and Loneliness (Swedish: Den allvarsamma leken) is a 1977 Swedish drama film directed by Anja Breien. Lil Terselius won the award for Best Actress at the 14th Guldbagge Awards. It is based on the 1912 novel The Serious Game by Hjalmar Söderberg.

== Cast ==
- Lil Terselius as Lydia Stille
- Stefan Ekman as Arvid Stjärnblom
- Katarina Gustafsson as Dagmar Randel
- Chatarina Larsson as Marta Brehm
- Birgitta Andersson as Hilma Randel
- Hans Alfredson as Freutiger
- Allan Edwall as Markel
- Ernst Günther as Jacob Randel
- Peter Schildt as Lidner
- Stig Ossian Ericson as Rissler
- Palle Granditsky as Anders Stille
- Erland Josephson as Doncker
