= Anders Lönnbro =

Swedish actor (1945–2022)

- Born: 10 October 1945; Gothenburg, Sweden
- Died: 8 September 2022 (aged 76)
- Occupation: Actor
- Years active: 1978–2022
- Spouse: Bodil Mårtensson (divorced)
- Children: Harald Lönnbro

Anders Lönnbro (10 October 1945 – 8 September 2022) was a Swedish actor. He won the award for Best Actor at the 14th Guldbagge Awards for his role in The Score. He appeared in more than 30 films and television shows since 1978. Lönnbro died on 8 September 2022, at the age of 76.

== Selected filmography ==
- The Score (1978)
- 1939 (1989)
- Tjenare kungen (2005)
- Patrik, Age 1.5 (2008)
