= Pale Olofsson =

Swedish musician (born 1947)

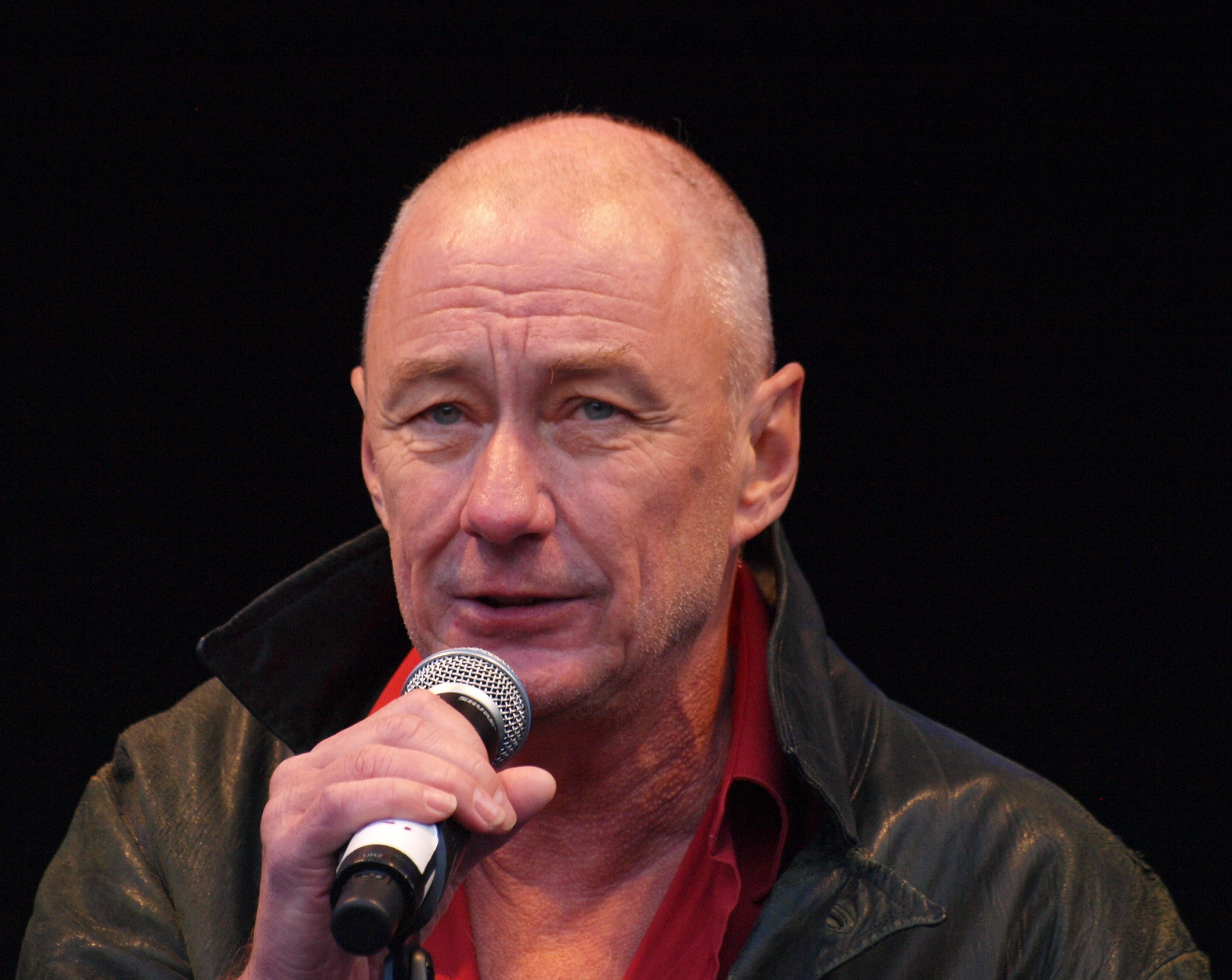
Pale Olofsson

Pale Olofsson (born 8 January 1947 as Paul Lennart Olofsson) is a Swedish rock musician, actor and artist. He is mostly known as one of the members of Nationalteatern.

He was born in Stockholm, (grew up in Årsta) and moved to Malmö in 1960.

He has appeared in films and TV series such as Lyftet, Lasermannen, and Let the Right One In.

== Filmography ==
Year	Title	Role	Notes
1978	The Score	Varan	
1990	Kurt Olsson - filmen om mitt liv som mej själv	Captain Karmfot	
2000	A Summer Tale	Head Waiter	
2001	Kattbreven	Filip	
2003	Huset vid vägens ände	Police Commissioner	
2008	Let the Right One In	Larry	
2009	The Girl with the Dragon Tattoo	Judge	
2014	Star Wars: Threads of Destiny	King Juster	
