= Lil Terselius =

Swedish actress (1944–2021)

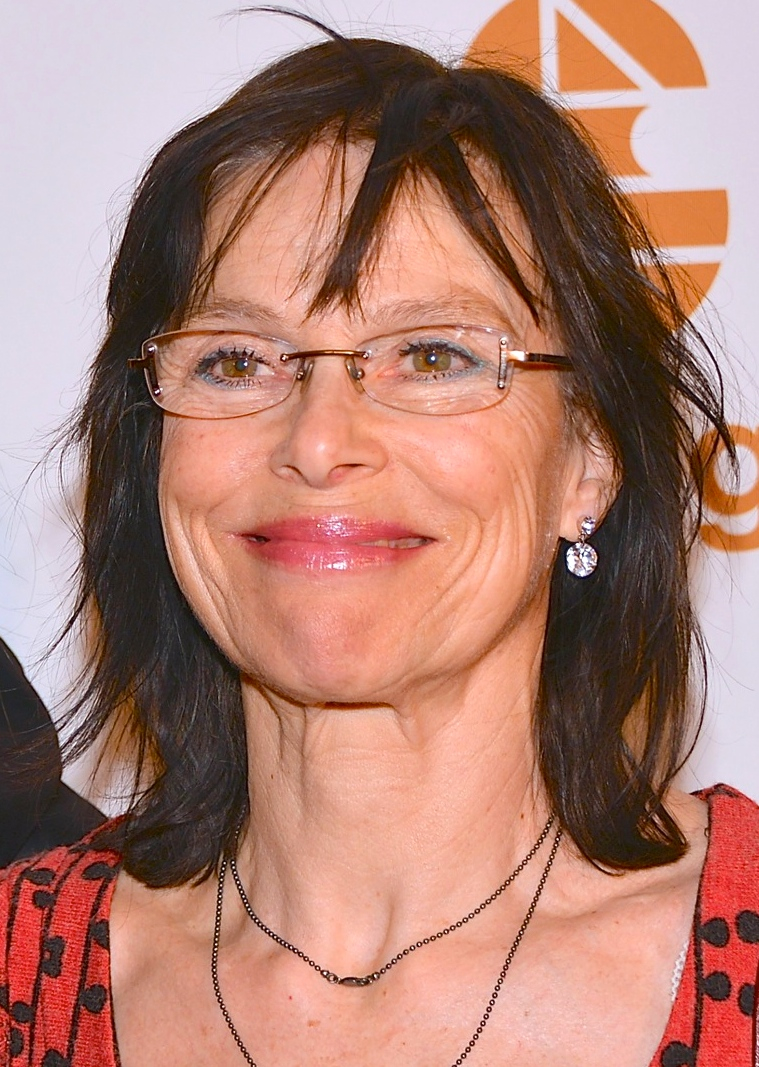
- Terselius at the 48th Guldbagge Awards (2013).
- Born: Lil Poldi Terselius; 5 November 1944; Stockholm, Sweden
- Died: 26 October 2021 (aged 76)
- Occupation: Actress
- Years active: 1973–2021
- Spouse(s): Hans Klinga (m. 1982–1990) ?Lars Norén (?–?)

Lil Poldi Terselius (5 November 1944 – 26 October 2021) was a Swedish stage and film actress. At the 14th Guldbagge Awards she won the award for Best Actress for her role in Games of Love and Loneliness. She won the Eugene O'Neill Award in 2000.
