= Love Hurts (comics) =

2009 comic anthology by Kim W. Andersson

- Cover to the first Swedish trade edition.
- Author: Kim W. Andersson
- Language: Swedish
- Genre: Graphic novel
- Publisher: Kartago Förlag
- Publication date: 2009
- Publication place: Sweden
- ISBN: 9789186003234

Love Hurts is a Swedish horror/romance comic anthology by Kim W. Andersson. The comic was originally published in under Swedish alternative comics anthology From the Shadow of the Northern Light and was serialized in America under Dark Horse Presents before being collected in omnibus form.

== Reception ==
Publishers Weekly wrote that "the initial two-page shorts lack much subtlety or technical skill, as the collection progresses, Andersson's development as both an artist and writer is evident" and that "While Andersson proves he's imaginative and versatile in his artwork, his writing is less so. Still, his work is nonetheless entertaining and makes a great read on Halloween and Valentine's Day alike."
