= Nermina Lukac =

Swedish actress

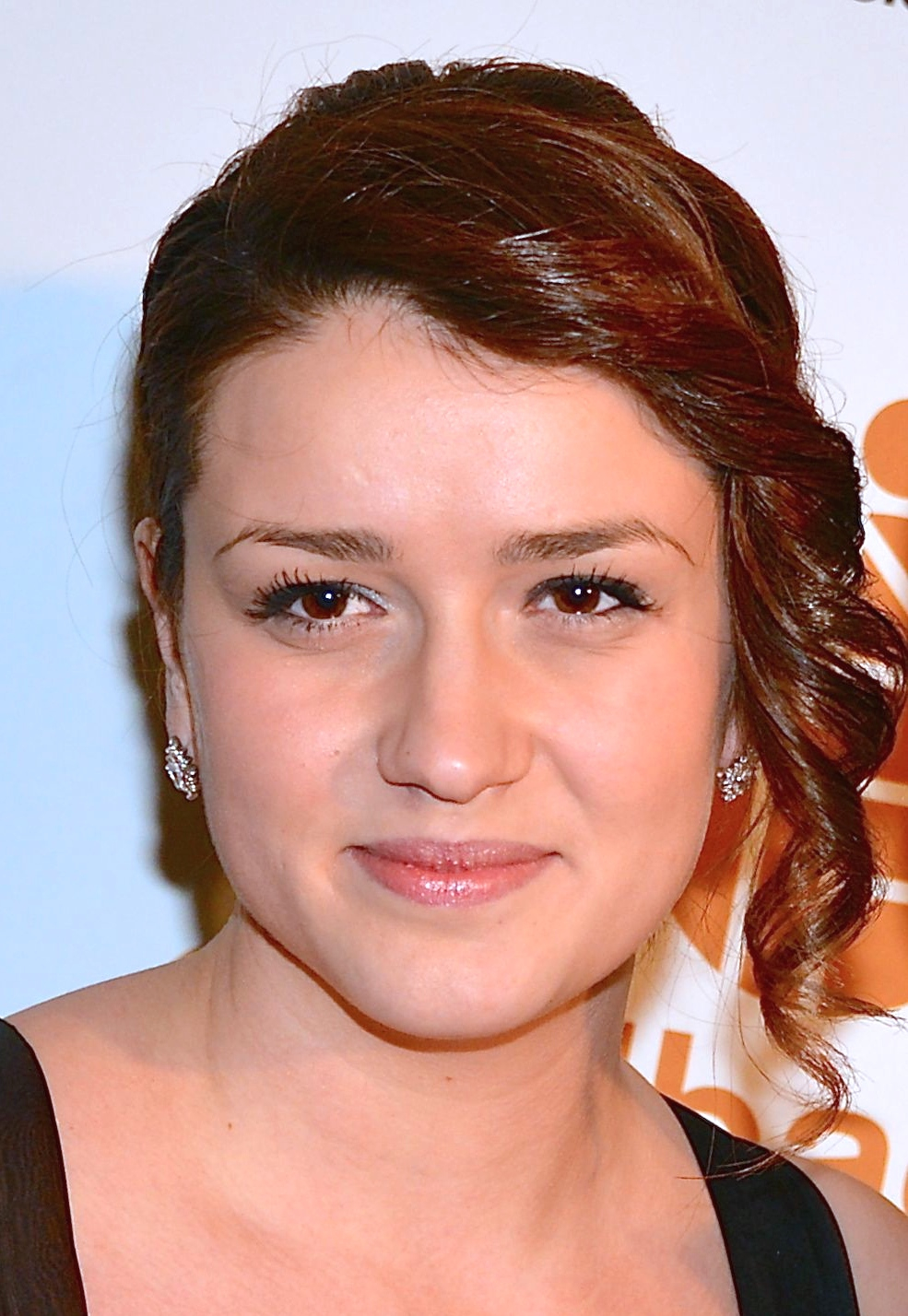
Nermina Lukac at the 2013 Guldbagge Awards

Nermina Lukac (born 5 January 1990; Montenegrin spelling Nermina Lukač) is a Swedish actress. Lukac won the 2012 Guldbagge Award for Best Actress in a Leading Role and other awards for her role in the film Eat Sleep Die.

== Biography ==
Lukac was born in Montenegro; her family immigrated to Sweden in 1992. She grew up in Munkedal and Åstorp and now lives in Helsingborg; she was trained as an educator, and until her film career began, worked in a recreation centre in Kvidinge.

== Career ==
Lukac's debut as Raša in Eat Sleep Die won her several awards, including the Guldbagge Award for Best Actress in a Leading Role, the Rising Star Prize at the Stockholm International Film Festival, the Shooting Stars Award at the 2013 Berlinale and the 2012 Helsingborgs Dagblad Culture Prize.

Lukac has said that she never sought an acting career and that it was "a shock" when she won the role in Eat Sleep Die after running into a casting agent at the recreation centre where she used to go when she was young.

Her next film role was in False Witness, an international film directed by Iglika Triffonova and released in 2015 as The Prosecutor the Defender the Father and His Son.
