= Gabriela Pichler =

Swedish film director and screenwriter (born 1980)

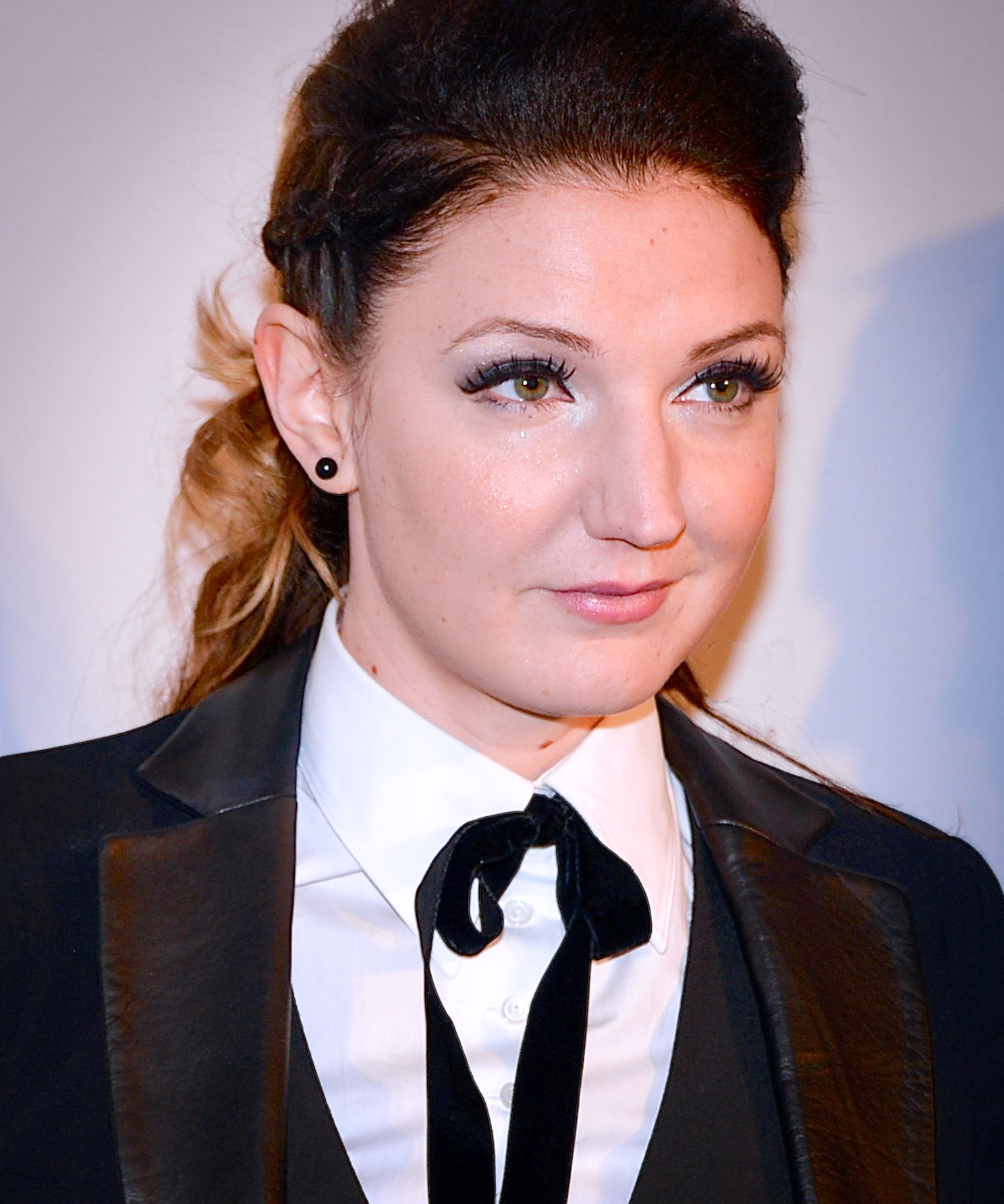
- Pichler at the 48th Guldbagge Awards
- Born: 1980 (age 44–45); Huddinge, Sweden
- Occupations: Film director; screenwriter
- Years active: 2010–present
- Notable work: Eat Sleep Die (2012)

Gabriela Pichler (born 1980 in Huddinge) is a Swedish film director and screenwriter.

== Biography ==
She was born in Huddinge in 1980. Pichler and her family moved from Stockholm to Örkelljunga when she was eight years old. Her mother, Ruzica Pichler, is from Bosnia and her father is from Austria. Her mother plays one of the roles in her 2012 feature film debut Eat Sleep Die. Pichler attended Öland's documentary school and School of Film Directing in Gothenburg.

In 2010, she received a Guldbagge Award at the 45th Guldbagge Awards, in the category for Best Short film for Scratches (Skrapsår), which was her thesis at the School of Film Directing. The same year she received the Bo Widerberg Scholarship.

Pichler's first feature film, Eat Sleep Die, premiered in Sweden on 5 October 2012. The film won the Audience Award in International Film Critics' Week at the 69th Venice International Film Festival. Pichler was awarded two Guldbagge Awards at the 48th Guldbagge Awards for her work on the film; Best Directing and Best Screenplay. The film was also awarded in the category Best Film. For the film, she was also awarded the Jan Myrdal Society's little literary prize "The Robespierre Prize" on 13 April 2013 in Varberg.
