= Sommarpratarna =

Swedish television programme

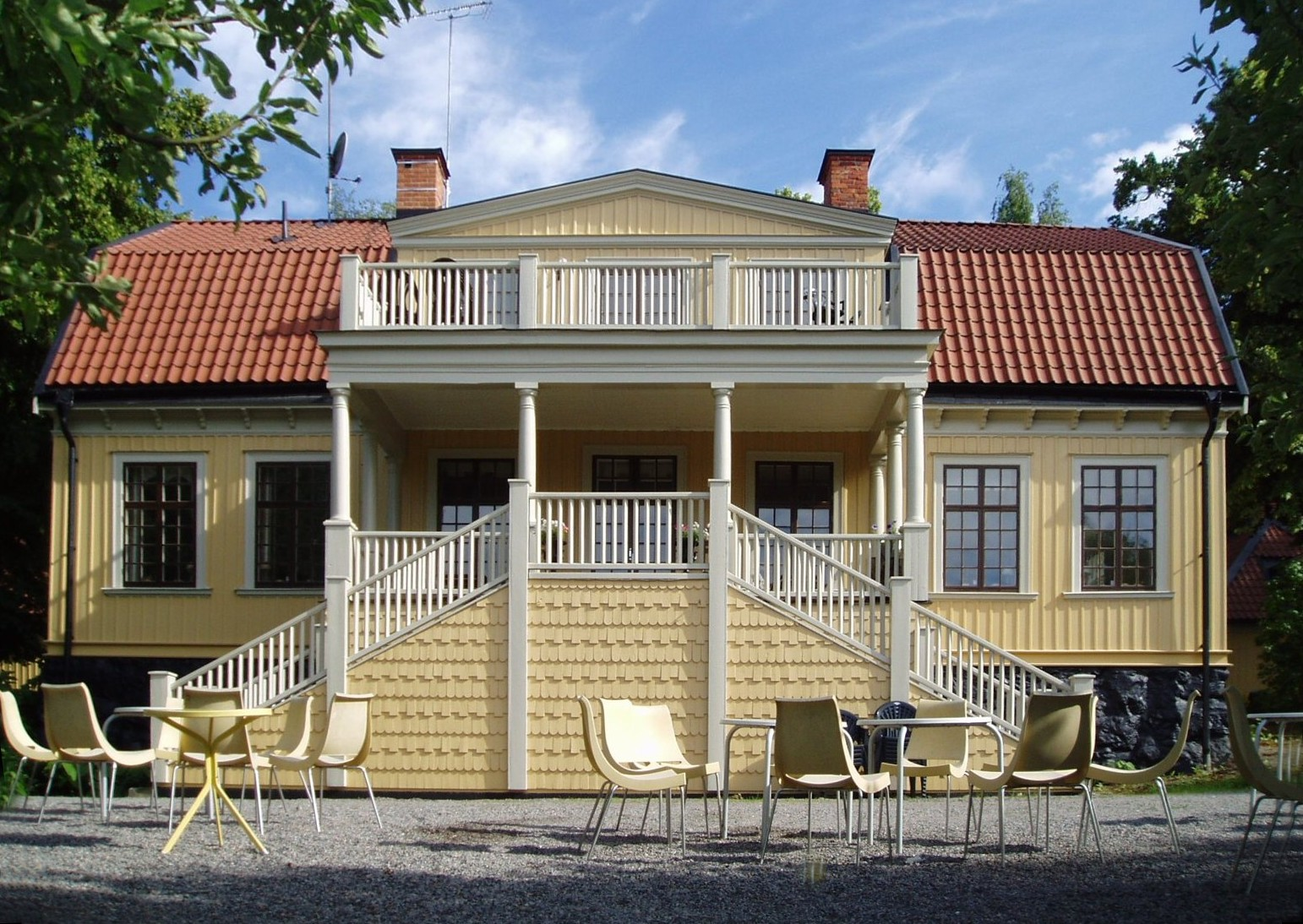
Location for the filming of Sommarpratarna at Skärholmens gård

Sommarpratarna (i.e., ‘summer speakers’) is a Swedish television series at Sveriges Television. The series had its premiere on 10 November 2009 and has been broadcast every year since. It features the celebrity guests of the radio show Sommar i P1.
