= Thomas Hedengran =

Swedish actor

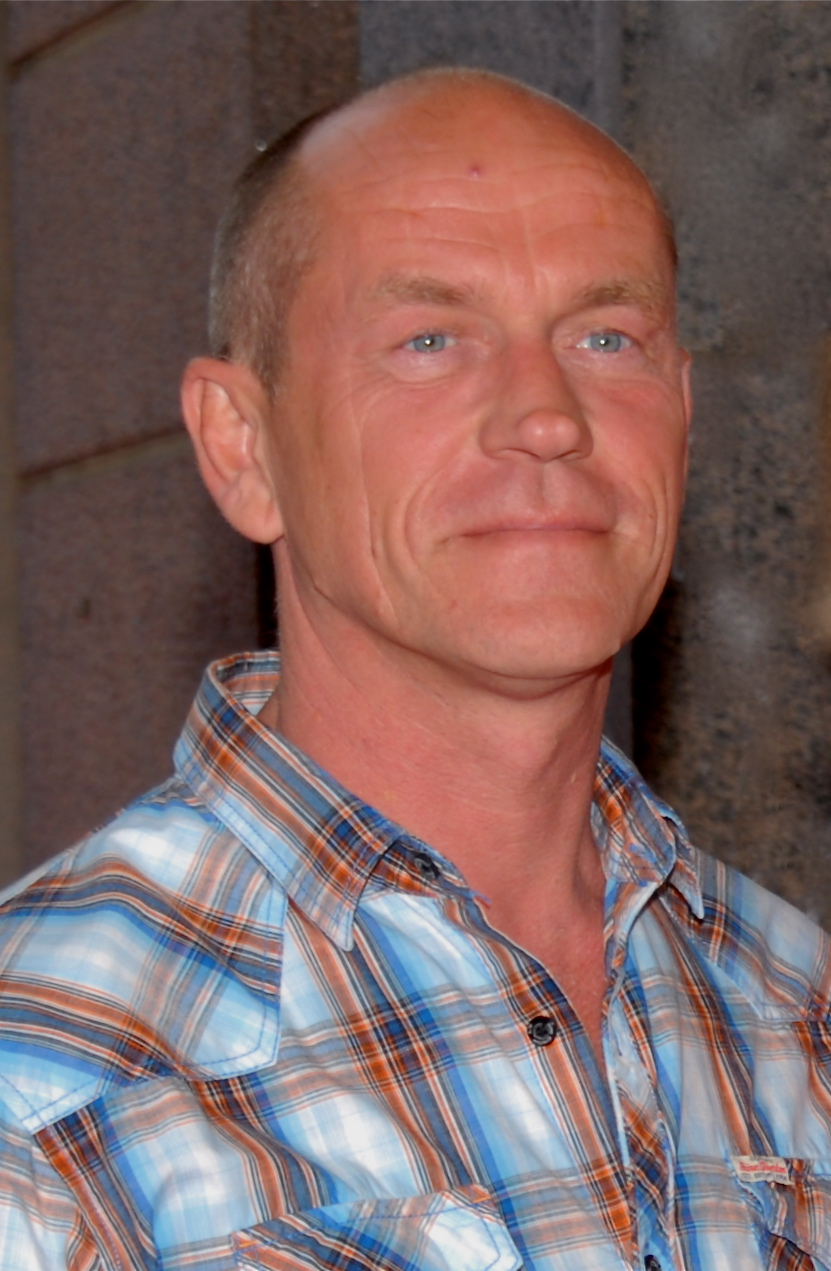
- Hedengran in 2011
- Born: Ulf Thomas Hedengran; February 11, 1965 (age 61); Stockholm, Sweden
- Occupation: Actor
- Years active: 1988-present

Ulf Thomas Hedengran (born February 11, 1965) is a Swedish actor. He is often cast in grisly thrillers and horror films.

== Biography ==
Hedengran has become a well-known actor in many Swedish television series and films. He has also worked as a stage actor in Lorden från gränden and Intiman.

He participated in the musical Lorden från gränden and Intiman. He also played 265 performances of the revue Alla ska bada as a member of the theatre group Galenskaparna och After Shave. Another member of the group, Peter Rangmar, unexpectedly died just before the premiere.

He has also appeared in minor roles in a couple of others of the group's film and TV productions such as Ake from Åstol and the citizen. He also played farce Stolen love at Liseberg Theatre in Gothenburg, and later at Intiman in Stockholm and finally on tour in southern Sweden. In 2006 he played a doctor in the horror comedy Frostbite. More recently, he appears in the starring role of Krister in Marianne and is set to play a vengeful pagan father in the upcoming viking film Inferior.

== Filmography ==
- 2018 - Draug
- 2018 - The Cabin
- 2016 - Inferior
- 2014 - Faust 2.0
- 2014 - The Thieves' Christmas: The Wizard's Daughter
- 2011 - The Thieves' Christmas
- 2011 – Marianne
- 2008 - Oskyldigt dömd
- 2008 - Dead on Arrival
- 2006 - Frostbite
- 2006 - Sökarna: Återkomsten
- 2004 - The Commission
- 2002 - The Invisible
- 1999 - En liten julsaga
- 1998 - Hamilton
- 1996 - The Disappearance of Finbar
- 1996 - The Hunters
