= Rasmus Tirzitis =

Swedish film editor

- Born: Rasmus Ludwig Emanuel Tirzitis; 31 July 1986 (age 39); Trångsund, Stockholm
- Occupations: Film director, Film Editor, Screenwriter
- Years active: 2005–present

Rasmus Ludwig Emanuel Tirzitis (born 31 July 1986) is a Swedish film director and editor from Trångsund, Stockholm. He is best known as the director and producer of Star Wars: Threads of Destiny which is a fan film, created by fans of George Lucas' Star Wars saga.

Tirzitis graduated from the Stockholm Film School in Stockholm in 2008.

He has both directed and edited directorial debut Vilsen (2016). His second film The Huntress: Rune of the Dead (2019) was a co-production between Sweden and the company ITN Distribution, Las Vegas, Nevada, USA. The screenplay for the film was written by Tirzitis together with Faravid Af Ugglas.

His production company is Tirzitis Entertainment.

== Filmography ==
Year	English title	Original title	Country^{^{[I]}}	Functioned as
2008	Rana		Sweden	Director, editor, cameraman
2010	The Easy Way (Short Film)	Den Enkla Vägen	Sweden	Editor
2011	Min Vän Josef (Short Film)		Sweden	Editor
2011	The Wedding Plan (Short Film)	Bröllopsplaneringen	Sweden	Director, editor
2011	Amalia (Short Film)		Sweden	Editor
2012	Farewell Teddy (Short Film)		Sweden	Editor
2013	Fröken Julie (2013)		Sweden	Editor
2014	Star Wars: Threads of Destiny		Sweden	Director, editor, producer
2014	Imprisoned (Short Film)	Fången	Sweden	Director, editor
2016	Vilsen		Sweden	Director, editor
2019	The Huntress: Rune of the Dead		Sweden	Director, writer, editor, producer
2022	Snared (Short Film)	Repögla	Sweden	Director, writer, editor
