= Mama (magazine) =

Monthly women's magazine in Sweden

- Categories: Women's magazine
- Frequency: Monthly
- Circulation: 39,600 (2014)
- Publisher: Bonnier Tidskrifter
- Founded: 2003; 22 years ago
- Company: Bonnier
- Country: Sweden
- Based in: Stockholm
- Language: Swedish
- Website: Mama
- ISSN: 1651-8772

Mama is a monthly women's magazine published in Stockholm, Sweden. Its readers are mostly mothers.

== History and profile ==
Mama was established in 2003. The magazine is part of Bonnier group and is published by Bonnier Tidskrifter AB 13 times a year. The headquarters of the magazine is in Stockholm. It targets mothers and offers articles on fashion, food, travel and interior design. In addition, the magazine publishes the findings of several surveys concerning the lives of mothers in Sweden.

In 2013 the circulation of Mama was 45,600 copies. Its circulation in 2014 was 39,600 copies.
