= Faust 2.0 =

2014 Swedish film

- Film poster
- Directed by: Nicolas Debot (See Alice); Micke Engström (Nätttrollets diskreta charm); Allan Gustafsson (MoralCall); Johannes Pinter (Inspirapption); Robert Selin (Bad News)
- Written by: Micke Engström
- Produced by: Nicolas Debot; Micke Engström; Johannes Pinter
- Starring: Thomas Hedengran
- Cinematography: Tarin Anderson; Thomas Rydell; Pascal Lacroix; Jeff Wheaton
- Edited by: Léo Ghysels; Henrik Qvarnström
- Music by: Emil Brandqvist; Steve Moore; Aria Prayogi; Fredrik Möller
- Production company: NjutaFilms
- Distributed by: NjutaFilms
- Release dates: September 27, 2014 (Lund Fantastisk); October 17, 2014
- Running time: 79 minutes
- Country: Sweden
- Language: Swedish

Faust 2.0 is a Swedish horror anthology film produced by NjutaFilms. It's a modern spin on the story of Faust, the premise being that people accept the End-user license agreement of iPhone application without reading it through, allowing the Devil to easier trick people into selling their souls for mundane needs.

== Cast ==
- Thomas Hedengran as Vincent
- Frida Liljevall as Elisabeth
- Katarina Bothén as Stark
- Peter Stridsberg as Vince
- Mattias Redbo as Joel
- Ida Linnertorp as Liv
- Per Ragnar as Faust
- Anders Fager as Gentleman

== About ==
The film was one of the first to be produced by NjutaFilms in 14 years, since Nicolas Debot's short "Facts Are Safety" in 2001. The film premiered at Monsters of Film. The film was not well received by Swedish critics.
