= Eat Sleep Die =

- International release poster
- Directed by: Gabriela Pichler
- Written by: Gabriela Pichler
- Produced by: China Åhlander
- Starring: Nermina Lukac; Milan Dragišić
- Cinematography: Johan Lundborg
- Music by: Andreas Svensson
- Production company: Anagram Produktion AB
- Distributed by: Triart Film AB
- Release date: 5 October 2012
- Running time: 100 minutes
- Country: Sweden
- Language: Swedish
- Box office: $ 58 278

Eat Sleep Die (Swedish: Äta sova dö) is a 2012 Swedish drama film written and directed by Gabriela Pichler. Set in present-day Sweden, it follows a realistic story about an unemployed young woman named Raša (Nermina Lukac), who struggles to find a new job while simultaneously taking care of her sick father (Milan Dragišić).

The film is Pichler's feature debut, and the cast consists primarily of amateurs. The film's main actress Nermina Lukac has received many accolades for her performance.

The film has received several awards. At the 48th Guldbagge Awards it received five nominations, including in the category Best Film, which it also won. Gabriela Pichler was awarded two awards for Best Director and Best Screenplay, and Nermina Lukac won the award for Best Actress. The film was also nominated for the 2013 Nordic Council Film Prize. The film was also selected as the Swedish entry for the Best Foreign Language Film at the 86th Academy Awards, but it was not nominated.

== Plot ==
The film tells the story of 20-year-old Raša (Nermina Lukac), who lives with her sickly father (Milan Dragišić) in a small town in southern Sweden. Raša works in a local factory but is laid off when the factory downsizes. The film then follows her struggle to find a new job while simultaneously taking care of her father.

== Cast ==
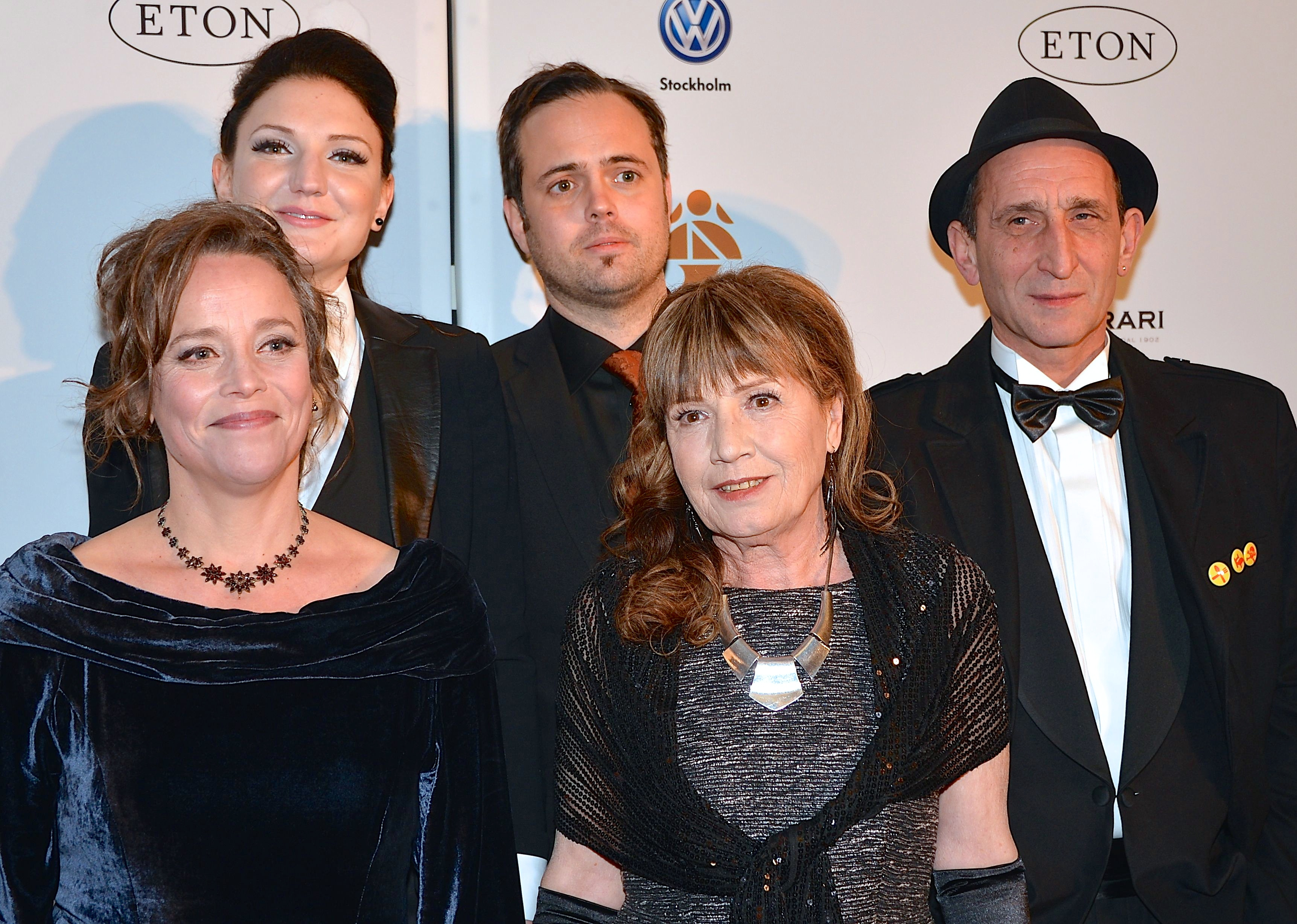
The cast and crew of Eat Sleep Die at the 48th Guldbagge Awards. Back row: Gabriela Pichler, Johan Lundborg, Milan Dragišić. Front row: China Åhlander, Ružica Pichler.

- Nermina Lukač as Raša
- Milan Dragišić as the father
- Jonathan Lampinen as Nicki
- Peter Fält as Peter
- Ružica Pichler as Rosi
- Nicolaj Schröder as Olle

== See also ==
- List of submissions to the 86th Academy Awards for Best Foreign Language Film
- List of Swedish submissions for the Academy Award for Best Foreign Language Film
