= Alena (2015 film) =

- Theatrical poster
- Directed by: Daniel di Grado
- Based on: Alena by Kim W. Andersson
- Starring: Amalia Holm Bjelket; Felice Jankell; Rebecka Nyman; Molly Nutley
- Release dates: 15 October 2015 (Sitges Film Festival); 19 August 2016 (Sweden)
- Country: Sweden
- Language: Swedish

Alena is a Swedish horror film directed by Daniel di Grado. It is based on the Swedish graphic novel Alena by Kim W. Andersson. The original graphic novel dealt with themes of homophobia, external and internalized, themes which are absent in the film.

== Cast ==
- Amalia Holm as Alena
- Molly Nutley as Filippa
- Felice Jankell as Fabienne
- Rebecka Nyman as Josefin
- Helena af Sandeberg as Headmistress

== Reception ==
Dennis Harvey of Variety wrote that the film is a "polished and reasonably entertaining hunk of teen angst, but its familiar suspense elements rely heavily on a “twist” most viewers will see coming a mile off." Jennie Kermode wrote "Everything about this film is exquisite, from its gorgeously textured cinematography to the delicate performances of its stars. Nothing has been left to chance, and the result is compelling viewing."
