= Bodil Mårtensson =

Swedish writer

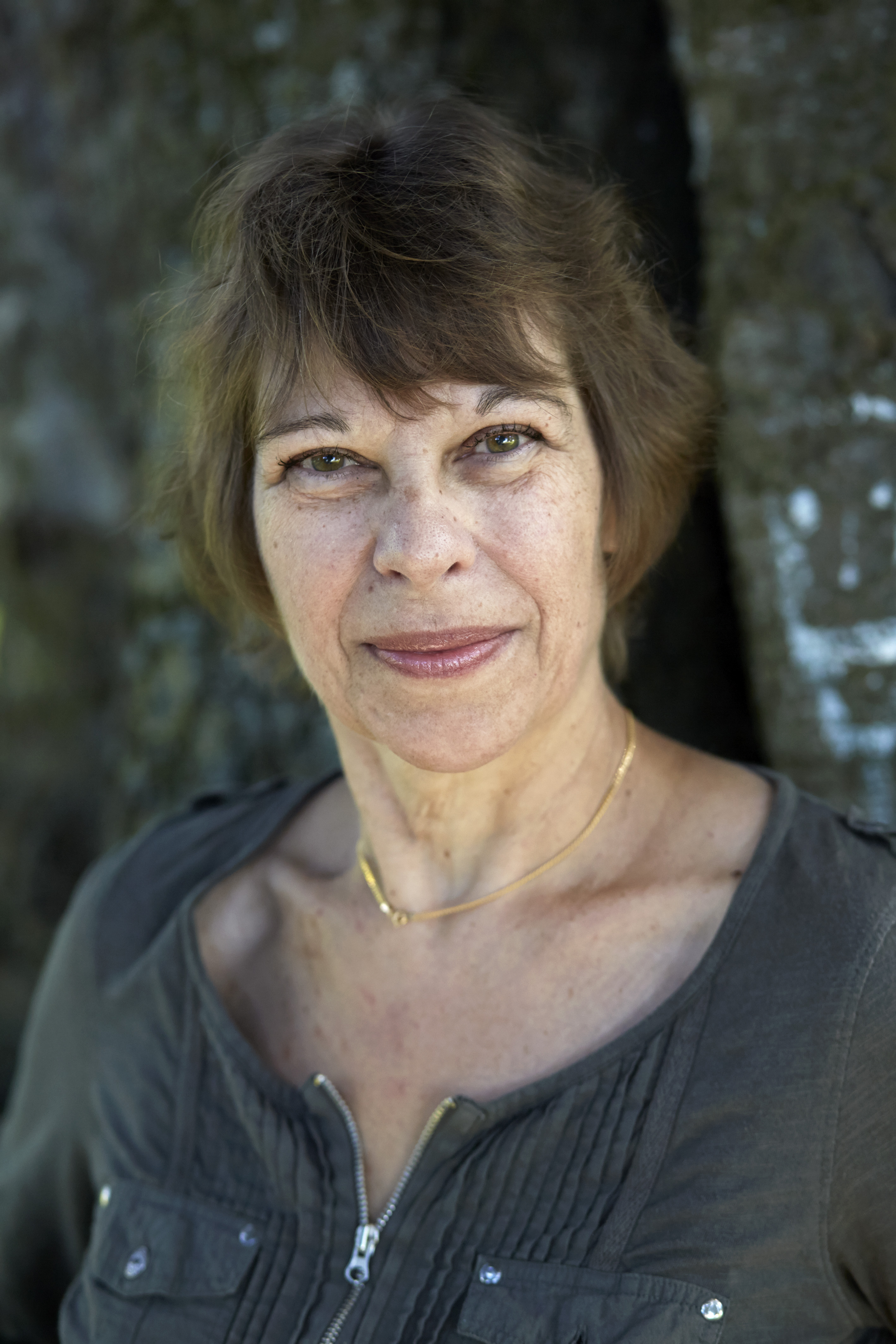
Bodil Mårtensson, 2014

Bodil Mårtensson (born 1952 in Karlskrona, Sweden) is a Swedish author of crime (police) novels and adventure books for the moderately young.

Mårtensson lived for fifteen years in Helsingborg, which is also the site of most of her fiction, which features a recurring staff of Helsingborg investigators, partly and sympathetically modeled after some actual police, who are also consulted for technical and investigatory details. She began writing after her son had been born, with Bertil Mårtensson. They divorced in 2005.

Most of her crime novels have been successfully translated into German and published by Bertelsmann. She has also published a number of popular short stories, all of this since her book debut in 1999. German titles given in parentheses below.

== Selected works ==
=== Police or crime novels ===
- En chans för mycket (1999) (Die zärtliche Zeugin)
- Beckmörker (2000) (Die Frau im Schatten, Norwegian transl. Bekmørke)
- Torpeden (2001) (Die Tote im Sund)
- Konsten att dö (2002) (Die Kunst des Sterbens)
- Jag vet att du är ensam (2004) (Die Drohung)
- Cuba Red (2005)
- Nattportierns historia (2006)
- Brottskod 09 (2007)

=== Adventures for the young ===
- Fyndet på havets botten (2004)
- Delfinernas hämnd (2004)
- Hajvarning (2005)
- Monstret på djupet (2005)
- Flygarens hemlighet (2005)
- Mördarmusslans förbannelse (sept 2006 B Wahlströms förlag)

=== For easy reading ===
- Glasets hemlighet (2004)
- Slottet Standheart – ett farligt arv (sept 2006)
