= Alena (graphic novel) =

2015 graphic novel by Kim W. Andersson

- Cover to the first edition.
- Date: 2015

Creative team
- Writers: Kim W. Andersson
- Artists: Kim W. Andersson

Alena is a 2015 Swedish graphic novel written and illustrated by Kim W. Andersson. It was later made into the film Alena. Alena was the winner of the Swedish Comics Academy's Adamson statue, Sweden's most prestigious comics award. It is published in English in the United States by Dark Horse Comics.

== Reception ==
Zeb Larson wrote "This is a violent and uncomfortable story, one that I'm not sure I'd want to pick up again because its depiction of teenage life is so uncomfortable. But it's still a good and compellingly dark read. It's clever and nuanced, and even if you can only read it once because it's so disturbing, you should do it." Pop Culture Uncovered discussed the artwork with "Andersson's style reminds me of [Robert] Crumb in some ways and it's rawness, and ugliness at times, make the story feel real in a way traditional comic art probably wouldn't."

== Conception ==
Kim W. Andersson said the graphic novel was largely inspired by the film version of Carrie. He has also cited the comic series Love and Rockets as an influence.
