= Shortcut (magazine) =

Swedish magazine

Shortcut is a Swedish-language magazine and meeting place centred on work and lifestyle. The magazine was established in January 1999. It is published bimonthly and aims at people with higher education, entrepreneurs, free agents and self-taught people.
