= Shortcut Software =

American software company

Shortcut
- Type: Private
- Industry: Software
- Founded: New York City; 2014; 12 years ago
- Founders: Kurt Schrader; Andrew Childs
- Headquarters: New York City, New York, United States
- Products: Shortcut
- Number of employees: 80
- Website: shortcut.com

Shortcut is project management software for software development teams developed by Shortcut Software, Inc, an American software company. Until September 2021 it was known as Clubhouse.

== History ==
Shortcut, then known as Clubhouse, was founded in 2014, with the aim of “bringing more transparency and predictive models to the process of software engineering”. After a year in beta, its flagship product, a project management platform called Clubhouse, was launched in 2016.

In December 2017, Clubhouse raised US$10 million in Series A round of funding, led by Battery Ventures. Previous to this, the company had raised US$4 million across two rounds of seed funding from Resolute Ventures, Lerer Hippeau Ventures, BoxGroup, RRE Ventures, and Brooklyn Bridge Ventures.

In January 2020, Clubhouse raised US$25 million in Series B round of funding, led by Greylock Partners. The round also included previous investors Battery Ventures and Lerer Hippeau.

On July 29, 2021, the company announced it would be changing its company and product name to Shortcut, effective mid-September, citing challenges in maintaining its prior brand following the growth of the Clubhouse chat app. It officially switched over to the new name on September 13, 2021.

The company has no relationship with the invitation-only audio-chat app of the same name which launched on iOS in April 2020. The identical names of the two apps regularly caused confusion after the chat app's launch. For example, in February 2021, after Elon Musk announced that he would make an appearance on the platform, Android users looking for the chat service review bombed Clubhouse Software's Android app, causing the company to pull the app temporarily.

In April 2022, Shortcut was recognized as one of the best companies to work for in the U.S. by earning the Great Place to Work Certification. 97% of Shortcut employees said it was a great place to work, 40 points higher than the average U.S. company.

== Products ==
=== Shortcut ===
Shortcut is a commercial software product for project management and issue tracking. It includes features to track and plan user stories, plan software development sprints, visualize work in progress with kanban boards, share plans with product roadmaps, and report on progress of work. Shortcut is also free for up to 10 users.

Shortcut has integrations with Slack, GitHub, GitLab, Bitbucket and others. It is available through a web application.

Shortcut is written in Clojure, with a custom JavaScript front end. Its features can also be accessed using a REST API. The Shortcut API (then called the Clubhouse API) was noted in 2019 as "one of the most talked about APIs" by ProgrammableWeb.

=== Korey ===
In September 2025, Shortcut launched Korey, an artificial intelligence–powered product development tool designed for software engineering workflows. Korey integrates with Shortcut and GitHub Issues to automate the creation of project artifacts such as user stories, specifications, and sub-tasks. It also provides real-time status updates, sprint recaps, and answers to natural language queries about project progress.

Industry analysts described Korey as part of a broader trend toward applying AI to software project management. SiliconANGLE reported that the product brings "AI orchestration to product management," while theCUBE Research highlighted its potential to reduce planning cycle times and improve schedule adherence. Intellyx characterized Korey as an example of an AI agent embedded into engineering workflows.

== Features ==
Shortcut offers a range of features to help teams work more efficiently and stay organized. Objectives, Docs, and Teams let users track tasks and goals, while Sprints help track progress and productivity.

=== Objectives ===
Objectives help align a team's work with a company's broader goals. There are two types of Objectives: Strategic and Tactical. Strategic Objectives include key results to monitor targets and outcomes. Tactical Objectives can be set and directly connect to the tasks and projects that support them. This approach provides organizations with a unified source of truth, fostering better collaboration across teams.

=== Docs ===
In July 2022, Shortcut introduced Docs, a documentation system tightly integrated with the platform to help teams capture and share long-form documentation, such as design documents and product strategies, directly within their project management workflow. Companies can use it to create and collaborate on documents in real time, with features like code blocks, syntax highlighting, customized lists, and multimedia.

=== Sprints ===
The Sprints feature enables users to set start and end dates, sending reminders to the team to stay on track with various projects. Each Sprint includes detailed reports, such as burn-down charts and velocity tracking, providing a clear view of team performance.

=== Teams ===
Shortcut's Teams feature organizes work by assigning projects directly to specific teams. Team performance can be measured through team-specific reports and charts, offering a clear view of how well the team is progressing on their tasks.

=== Roadmaps ===
Shortcut provides two ways to share plans and progress: a timeline Roadmap and a team Roadmap. The timeline Roadmap presents Epics in a chronological format. The team Roadmap is organized by teams and structured by Epics. Each Epic on the Roadmap displays a status, target completion date, and a contextual comment for providing status updates.

=== Custom Fields ===
Custom Fields provide the ability to organize Stories by Priority, Severity, Technical Area, Skill Set, and Product Area with structured, searchable fields. The option to use Advanced Custom Fields was added to enable editing of names, icons, descriptions, and field values.

=== Backlogs ===
The Backlog in Shortcut is a page designed to store, manage and prioritize work before it properly makes its way into a workflow. Stories from the Backlog can be directly added to Sprints when ready to be worked on.

=== APIs ===
Shortcut also integrates with different platforms via the REST API for custom workflows. This integration allows access, creation, updating, or deletion of data related to Shortcut projects.
