= Sommar (radio program) =

Swedish radio program

Sommar i P1
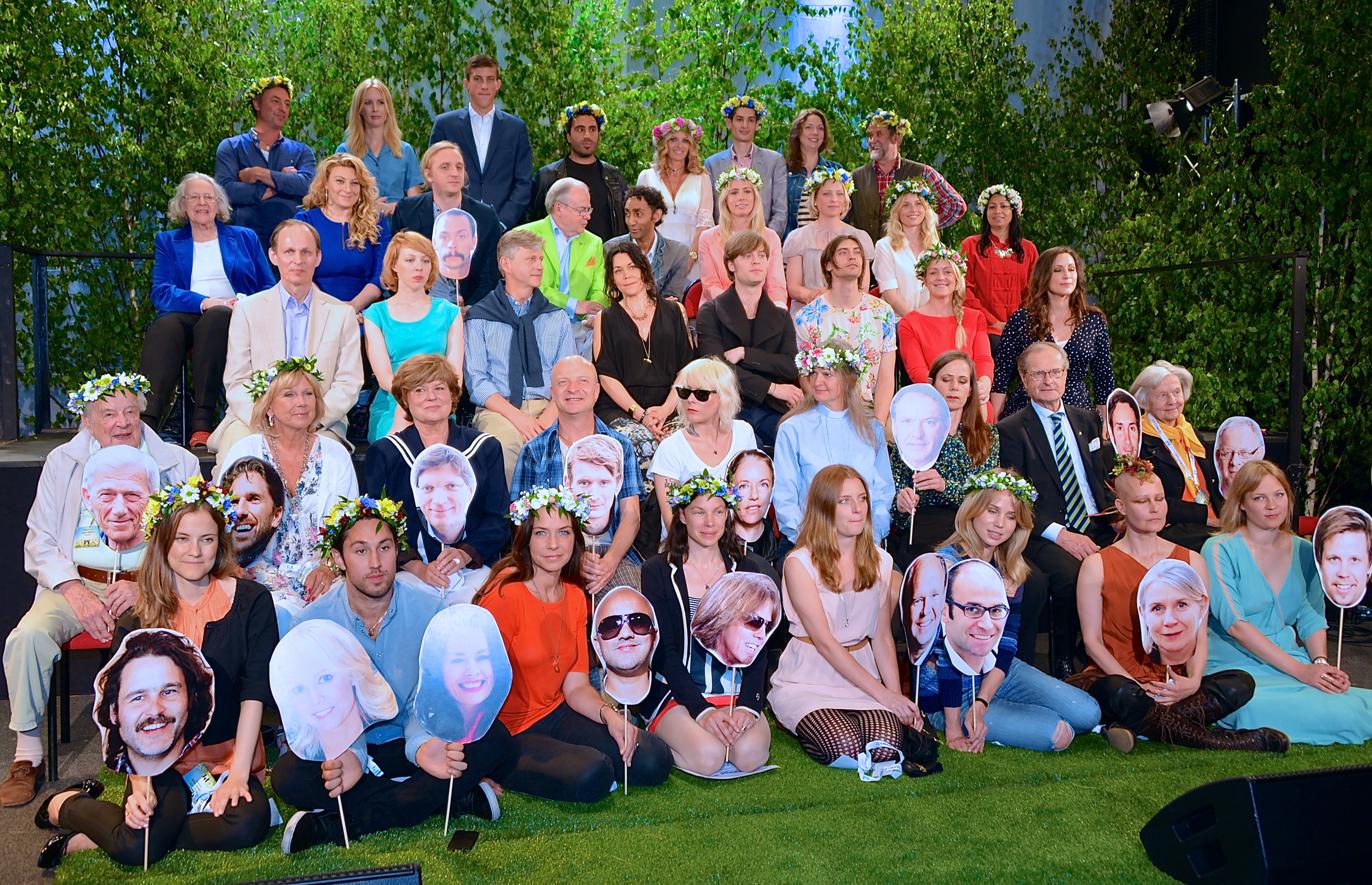
- The hosts of Sommar i P1, 2013
- Genre: music, talk, entertainment
- Country of origin: Sweden
- Language(s): Swedish
- Home station: SR P1 (earlier SR P3)
- Original release: 29 June 1959

Sommar i P1 (lit. 'Summer on P1') is one of the most popular shows on Swedish radio. It has been broadcast every summer since 29 June 1959, originally as Sommar on P3 and since 1993 on P1. (Note: A revamp of radio channel identities in 1993 resulted in the shifting of factual content from P3 to P1 in that year, to make way for P3's new youth-centred identity.)

== About ==
Each 90-minute-long programme in the series – which is broadcast daily from Midsummer's day until the middle of August at 13:00 (a timeslot held since the first episode) and repeated in the late evening – is presented by a different host who talks about a topic of personal relevance and plays music of their own choosing.

Being invited to host the show has been compared to receiving a knighthood in Sweden, and it has become the custom for each year's presenters to be featured in a group photograph, each wearing a floral crown known as a midsommarkrans as a mark of the "honour" bestowed upon them.

The host has to speak Swedish (or, very occasionally, of another Scandinavian language). However, in 2014, intense international interest led to the production of an English-language edition presented by the YouTube celebrity PewDiePie (Felix Kjellberg). Subsequent hosts like Johan Rockström, Maher Zain, Ingrid Wall, Metallica drummer Lars Ulrich and Greta Thunberg have also hosted English-language editions of their programmes.

In the programme's early years the hosts – known as Sommarvärdar – were regular radio DJs who each presented several editions on a rotating basis, and the present format with a different guest presenter each day emerged during the 1970s.

The original concept for the show came from the then head of radio entertainment at Sveriges Radio, Tage Danielsson, and producer Jörgen Cederberg, who was also the first host. The programme's theme tune is Sommar, sommar, sommar, composed in 1951 by Sten Carlberg, with lyrics by Eric Sandström.

== Hosts ==
The hosts range from celebrities to politicians, scientists, authors, athletes, and royalty. Several prime ministers of Sweden and other Nordic countries have been hosts on the show. High-profile celebrities such as the actresses Anita Ekberg and Liv Ullmann and the film director Ingmar Bergman have all hosted their own Sommar show. Other hosts from the film industry include Academy Award winners and nominees such as Malik Bendjelloul, Kay Pollak, Tomas Alfredson, and Paul N. J. Ottosson. And journalists like Magdi Abdelhadi.

Members of ABBA and modern music stars such as Robyn or Maja Ivarsson from The Sounds, as well as authors such as Astrid Lindgren, Håkan Nesser and Karl Ove Knausgård have been hosts of their own shows. Other hosts have included such industry leaders as IKEA-founder (and one of the wealthiest persons in the world) Ingvar Kamprad and Volvo CEO Pehr G. Gyllenhammar. Niklas Zennström and Daniel Ek of Skype and Spotify fame, respectively, have also hosted their own shows.

In June 2014, Sveriges Radio received over 70 formal complaints concerning an edition of Sommar presented by the poet and playwright Athena Farrokhzad claiming that she encouraged left-wing violence. One month later, an edition presented by record producer Christian Falk was the first to be aired posthumously, as he died from cancer two days earlier. Another posthumously broadcast episode was the one by composer Sven-David Sandström, the second time he hosted the show, on 12 July 2019. He had died on 10 June.

== Producers ==
- Liliane Carlberg

== In other media ==
The show is broadcast on Swedish radio for a Swedish audience. However, in 2014, intense international interest led to the production of an English-language edition presented by YouTube celebrity PewDiePie (Felix Kjellberg).

In 2020, the English edition of Greta Thunberg's programme was also broadcast on BBC, and its script was published in TIME Magazine.

All of the shows are available for download from the Sommar website directly after broadcast. Since 2005, episodes of the show have also been available as podcasts, with more than 800 broadcast editions available from an archive covering the period from 1963 to the present.

At the annual press conference introducing each year's presenters the participants always appear wearing midsommarkrans floral head garlands. Since 2009, some of each year's presenters have also appeared in the Sveriges Television show Sommarpratarna.
