= Star Wars: Threads of Destiny =

- Threads of Destiny poster
- Directed by: Rasmus Tirzitis
- Written by: Michael Bano; Jeff Long; Matt Davis; Steven RR Parkers
- Produced by: Henric Brandt
- Starring: Patrik Hont; Carolina Neurath; Karl Lindqvist; Andreas Rylander; Karl Winden; Pale Olofsson; Sabinje von Gaffke; Anders Menzinsky
- Edited by: Rasmus Tirzitis
- Music by: Justin R. Durban
- Production companies: Tirzitis Entertainment; Branbomm Film; Eclipse FX
- Release date: February 23, 2014
- Running time: 110 minutes
- Country: Sweden
- Language: English
- Budget: $5,500+

Star Wars: Threads of Destiny is a 2014 English-language Swedish fan film, created by fans of George Lucas' Star Wars saga. The film takes place after Star Wars Episode VI: Return of the Jedi, and explores new adventures in a familiar galaxy.

Compared to the average fan film, Threads of Destiny runs long with a length of 110 minutes, and was relatively inexpensive to make, with a final budget between $5,500 and $6,000. The film was released online on February 23, 2014.

Threads of Destiny was originally uploaded to YouTube but was removed for violating copyright laws by Walt Disney Records in 2017.

== Plot ==
Ninety-four years after the Battle of Endor and the death of emperor Palpatine, the New Republic has been resurrected, and democracy once again presides in the galaxy. The Jedi Order is reestablished on the planet Yavin 4, and has continued to train new Jedi Knights in the art of peace and justice. But all is not peaceful in this new world. With the fall of the Galactic Empire, the ancient Skenvi Empire now comes out of the woodworks.

The Skenvi now oppose the New Republic for control over the galaxy with their growing empire. The Skenvi seek to seize control of all the galaxy's most valuable resources to cripple their enemies. And if a planet refuses to join them, they have been known to take very aggressive actions.

Caught in between this struggle over the fate of the galaxy is the little planet of Coreign. The planet possesses a very powerful resource that would greatly favour the side that has access to it if a galactic war was to emerge.

In its eagerness to gain access to Coreign's resources, the Skenvi Empire sends its most infamous negotiator, Lord Siege. He is a man who is known throughout the galaxy for seeing that the Skenvi Empire gets what it wants by all means necessary. The New Republic sends two of its Jedi ambassadors, Jedi Master Soran Darr and his Padawan, Raven Darkham.

Toward the end of the story, a suggestion was raised of the possibility that Jedi Raven and Princess Arianna's entanglement could lead to an ill consequence similar to what appeared to have happened earlier with Lord Siege, as briefly alluded to by his lament over his earlier involvement with Tashia.

== Cast ==
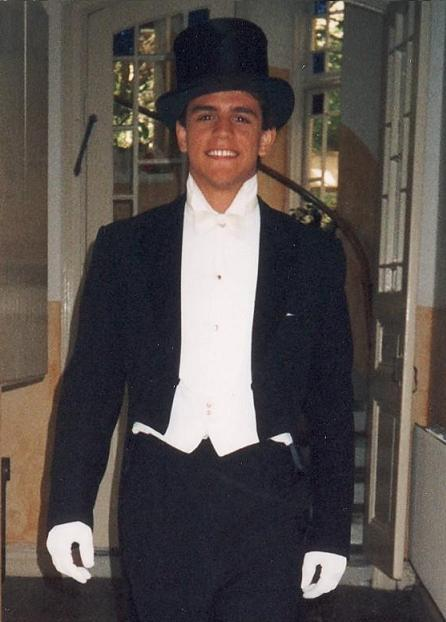
Hont in 2002

- Patrik Hont – Jedi Raven Darkham
- Carolina Neurath – Princess Arianna Ad'lah
- Karl Lindqvist – Jedi Master Soran Darr
- Andreas Rylander – Lord Siege
- Karl Windén – Karus Kahn
- Pale Olofsson – King Juster
- Sabinje von Gaffke – Queen Erin
- Anders Menzinsky – Jedi Master Joran Korn

== Production ==
The film started pre-production in April 2005, and was shot both in studio and on locations around Stockholm in Sweden in the Autumn of 2005 for a period of 22 days. Pick-up shoots conducted in 2006, 2007 and 2008 added another 10 production days. Threads of Destiny cost approximately $5,500 and $6,000 to make, mostly spent on raw materials for sets, props, costumes, catering and equipment rental to make the film. The film was made entirely with a volunteer cast and crew.

The VFX were done by a scattered group of artists around the world, working on different platforms and pieced together in post-production.

The script was first written by Michael Beano, a second draft and a novelisation was made by Jeff Long and the third shooting draft was made by Mathew Davis. Steven RR Parker did some rewrites after principal photography had ended.

=== Sound ===
Sound designer Danijel Djuric spent the early part of the work trying to find the right sounds. Some, such as animal sounds like cows' and whales', were bought. All sound effects were created and designed from scratch for the project, instead of borrowing from a sound library. Signature sounds were used, such as the sound of a lightsaber, R2-D2 devices and lasers.

=== Special effects ===
The film has around 2000 effect shots, with hundreds of artists over the whole world participating as volunteers. VFX artist Andreas Feix created about 720 of the effects shots in the final cut.

=== Soundtrack ===
Justin R. ''Dustbin'' Durban composed an original soundtrack for Threads of Destiny, which utilizes certain Star Wars themes. The soundtrack, along with CD case art, is available for download in mp3 format from the official Star Wars: Threads of Destiny site and also from the composer's site.

== Release ==
Although the finished film was made available on YouTube and BitTorrent on February 23, 2014, a gala premiere took place the previous day in Sweden for the cast, crew, friends and families, and several small theaters have shown their interest in screening the film, including a mall theater in Brazil.

As of 2016, Threads of Destiny is no longer available on YouTube due to copyright claims related to its musical score. Despite its removal from major platforms, the film remains an example of fan-driven creativity and the enduring passion of the Star Wars fanbase in creating original content that pays homage to the franchise.

On February 8, 2014, a prologue comic was released introducing some of the main characters and stories that will lead to the events in the film.

== Reception ==
The film has received a mixed response from Star Wars fans.

== Sequels ==
As of 2010, there were plans to create two sequels for the film, and the scripts for both of them were already written. Since Threads of Destiny took nine years to complete, however, it is unlikely that Tirzitis will make another fan film again.
