= Filip Tegstedt =

Swedish film director (born 1978)

- Born: August 31, 1978 (age 46); Östersund, Sweden
- Occupation: Film director

Filip Tegstedt (born August 31, 1978) is a Swedish film director, known for the Swedish language horror film Marianne (2011) which premiered at the 2011 Fantasia International Film Festival.

== Influences ==
Originally from a small town in the Östersund region of Sweden, Tegstedt has been interested in films from a young age. Having studied screenwriting academically, Filip refined his craft through guerrilla film-making. He has made short films and a Swedish language web series, and also worked as a production assistant on a number of film and television productions.

His experiences have influenced his work in Marianne. For instance, he has described his movie as an anti-Tim Burton film, reasoning that Marianne, filmed in the snowy North of Sweden looks bright, but feels dark.

== Filmography ==
- Marianne (2011)
