= Kennet Ahl =

Swedish writers

Kennet Ahl is the pseudonym of Swedish team Lasse Strömstedt (23 May 1935 – 4 July 2009) and Christer Dahl (born 30 December 1940), who wrote crime novels together.

== Works ==
- Grundbulten (1974)
- Lyftet (1976) or The Score
- Rävsaxen (1978)
- Slutstationen (1980)
- Mordvinnaren (1987)
- Högriskbegravning (2006)

Their 1976 novel Lyftet became a film of the same name in 1978, The Score.
