= Daniel Fridell =

Swedish film director, writer and producer (born 1967)

- Born: 31 March 1967 (age 59); Stockholm, Sweden
- Occupation: Film director
- Years active: 1993–present

Daniel Fridell (born 31 March 1967) is a Swedish film director and producer.

His most famous film, Sökarna (The Searchers), was made while he was still in film school. Since then, he has directed around ten feature films and TV series, working with actors like Noomi Rapace, Alexander Skarsgård, Sofia Helin, Mischa Barton, Mads Mikkelsen, and Rebecca De Mornay. His films have received international awards and been included in festivals like Toronto International Film Festival, South by Southwest, Telluride Film Festival and Busan International Film Festival.

Fridell's book One Word for Blood (Ett ord för blod), based on Faysa Idle's life, was named Sweden’s most important book in 2023 and topped the bestseller lists. His book series, Fridell & Hellström, includes Gangster Anonymous and the first book The Chess Player, which he co-wrote with Börge Hellström.

== Early life ==
Daniel Fridell grew up in Stockholm, Sweden. According to an interview in Aftonbladet, Daniels grandmother, Saga Sjöberg, introduced him to filmmaking when at the age of six she gave him a Super 8 film camera for Christmas. His first film "Squirrel Fight" featuring two Star Wars dolls and a squirrel premiered at the local daycare.

== Film career ==
In 1993, while attending Kulturama Film Academy in Sweden, Daniel and actor Liam Norberg used the schools cameras at night and made the first of numerous Scandinavian hits, Sökarna (English:The Searchers) in 1993. The main actor Liam Norberg was arrested at the premiere for the film for the biggest robbery in Northern Europe. The film was accused to be financed with some of the 100 million Euros stolen from the bank but the film was still released throughout Scandinavia and went to #1 at the box office. While some of the cast went to prison, Daniel made Cry, an urban Romeo & Juliet that was also hit the Box Office and knocked off films like The Lion King' from the #1 spot. Cry was in competition at the Tokyo Film Festival and won several prizes including best youth film at the Rotterdam Film Festival.

Fridell spent the early 1990s at the European Filmakademie in Berlin where he studied under Wim Wenders and Jan de Bont. He was invited to Los Angeles to continue studying with De Bont who was filming Basic Instinct and Twister where Daniel simultaneously enrolled at the Judith Weston Academy for Directors and Actors in Santa Monica.

He produced Under ytan in 1997, which became a success at the cinemas in Scandinavia, France and many other territories. It opened at the Montreal World Film Festival winning numerous awards and was officially selected for over 40 film festivals. Mikael Persbrandt and Johanna Sällström won major acting awards, as well it won awards for Best Film and Photo. USA Films optioned the remake rights and the film was sold to over 25 countries and distributed in the U.S by Phaedra. In the 1990s, it was also voted Best Swedish Feature by Swedish television.

His next feature, Dubbel-8 in 2000, was an official selection at the Toronto International Film Festival. Fridell continued down this path of critically acclaimed dark drama's into the early 2000s where he wrote and directed two features back-to-back, Blodsbröder (English title: Bloodbrothers) in 2005 with Noomi Rapace and Säg att du älskar mig (English title: Say That You Love Me) in 2006, both box office hits. Say That You Love Me newcomer, Haddy Jallow, also received Best Actress in Scandinavian for her role.

Throughout his career, Fridell has also directed, produced and written many successful TV series including Chock 1 - Dödsängeln in 1997 with Mikael Håfström and a comedy series, A Class of Its Own, which became a cult hit in Northern Europe. It also won the Egmont and Ebeltofts prize for Best Scandinavian Youth program. In 2005, he wrote the screenplay together with Reidar Jönsson to the upcoming film Hair of the Dog, a follow-up to the Oscar nominated My Life as a Dog as well as producing Rånarna (English title: Blank Point) in 2003, Universal Pictures first Scandinavian local production starring Mikael Persbrandt and Sofia Helin and Exit in 2006 starring Mads Mikkelsen and Alexander Skarsgård. In the mid-2000s where Fridell move to the US where his output changed from dark drama to documentaries and horror. He co-wrote and co-produced the Japanese horror Apartment 1303 in 2007. In 2011, he later helped out designing and co-directing the American remake Apartment 1303 3D with Mischa Barton and Rebecca De Mornay.

In 2011, he wrote and directed the critically acclaimed feature music documentary from Cuba, El Medico: The Cubaton Story, which has received numerous awards including Best Documentary at the New York International Latino Film Festival. It was also a festival selection at SXSW 2012, Busan International Film Festival in South Korea, Santa Barbara International Film Festival, Mar Del Plata, Afi Silver and LIDF England.

He made a documentary about the connection between the sailor Carl Petterson and Efraim Longstocking, Pippi Longstocking's father. Lindgren's ancestors gave the rights for the new fiction film.

== Director ==
- 2018: Svartenbrandt
- 2016: The Robbers daughter
- 2011: El Medico: The Cubaton Story
- 2010: Apartment 1303-Us Remake
- 2009: Apartment 1303-Japan original
- 2006: Säg att du älskar mig (Say That You Love Me)
- 2005: Blodsbröder
- 2001: En klass för sig (TV series)
- 2000: Swedish Beauty
- 1997: Beneath the Surface
- 1995: Juvenis: The Global Generation
- 1995: 30:e november
- 1993: Sökarna

== Awards and nominations ==
- New York International Latino Film festival - Best Documentary for El Medico - The Cubaton Story
- New York International Latino Film festival - The HBO prize for El Medico - The Cubaton Story
- Guldbagge - Säg att du älskar mig bästa kvinnliga skådespelare - Haddy Jallow
- Bergamo Film Meeting - Golden Rosa Camuna for Swedish Beauty
- Bergamo Film Meeting - Golden Rosa Camuna for Swedish Beauty
- Lucas - International Festival of Films for Children and Young People - Lucas Award for 30:e november
- Montreal World Film Festival - Grand Prix des Amériques for Beneath the Surface (nomination)
