= Thorsten Flinck =

Swedish actor, director, and musician

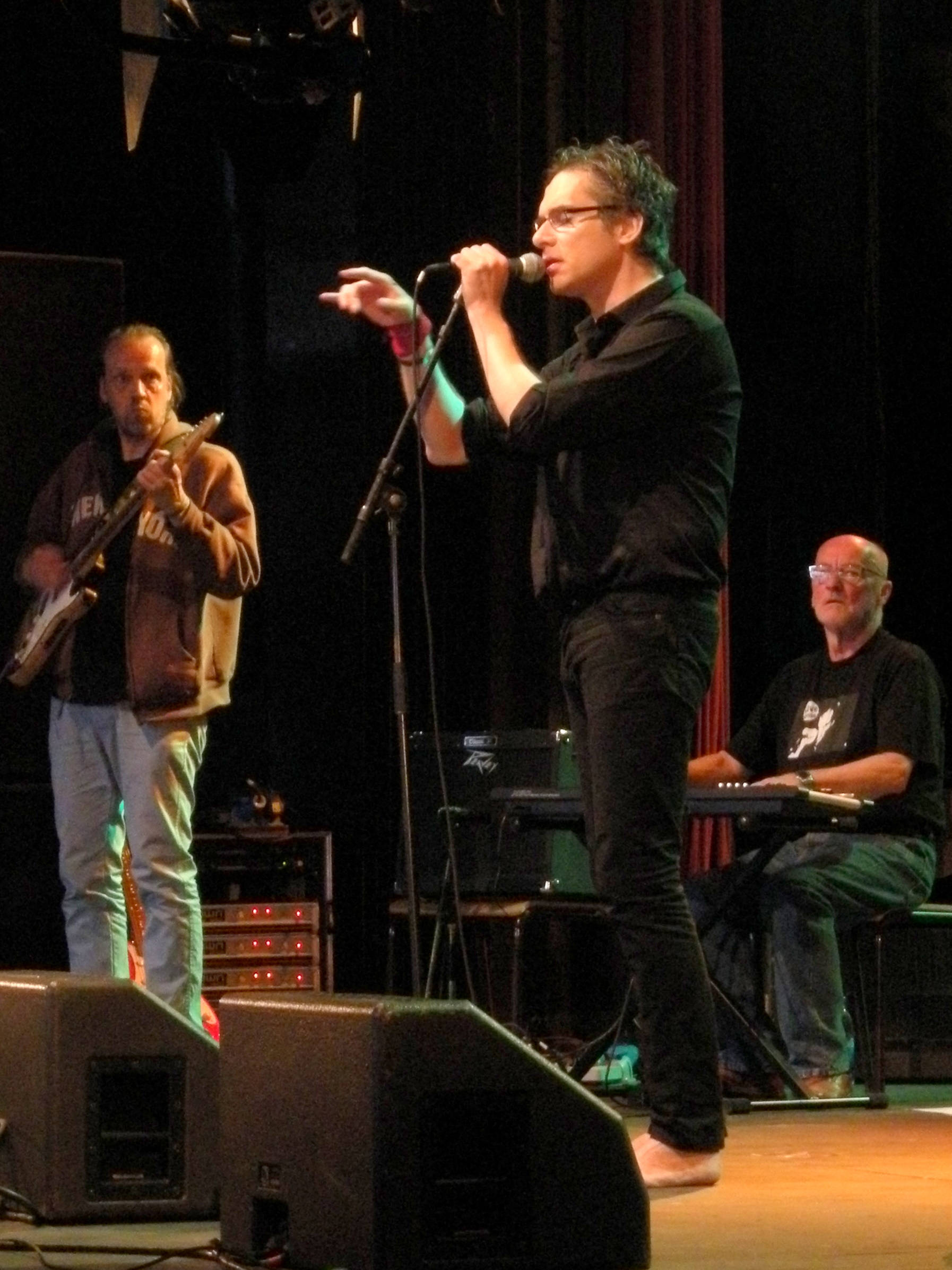
- Flinck performing at the 2010 Peace & Love festival
- Born: 17 April 1961 (age 65); Solna, Sweden
- Occupations: Actor; director; musician
- Years active: 1977–present

Thorsten Flinck (born 17 April 1961 in Solna, Sweden), is a Swedish actor, director, and musician. He is known best for playing psychopaths and villains, and also for his outrageous personality both on stage and in real life. Between 1986 and 2002, Flinck was employed by the Royal Dramatic Theatre.

== Acting / Directing ==
Theater

Thorsten Flinck began his involvement with theater in 1977 and graduated from the Swedish National Academy of Mime and Acting (Teaterhögskolan) in 1984. In theater, he worked at the Dramaten between 1986 and 2002 both as an actor and as a director. There he was best known for Herr Puntila in 1996, Lång dags färd in 1998 and Den goda människan i Sezuan in 1998. He also took part in Misantropen in 1995, Tant Blomma in 1993 and Romeo och Julia in 1991 and at the Uppsala City Theatre he played a lead role in Strindbergs' play Gustav III.

With Charlotta Larsson and Lena Nilsson, Flinck formed the "Grupp 98" theater group based at the Plaza Theater with Thorsten Flinck as director, artistic director and actor. There he directed Tre systrar in 1994, En handelsresandes död in 1996, Maskeraden in 1999, Fadren in 1999–2001, Flinck goes Wilde in 2002.

Flinck played Doktor Flinck, his own version of adaptation of Hjalmar Söderbergs' novel Doktor Glas where he played all the roles himself. He also played in Strindbergs' Paria. In 2009, he directed Natt med gäster.

Television

His first television role was in the TV series Peters Baby 1978 and his first directional work was Fordringsägare in 1989. In 1991 he directed the series Goltuppen, written by Leif GW Persson. With Pernilla Wahlgren, he hosted SVT's Christmas special Morgonstjärnan in 1985 with short skits and with Flinck and Peter Dalle in Spökhotellet in 1987 as well as appearing in various TV productions. He had a regular feature on TV4's show Hetluft in 2003-2004 season. He landed lead roles in August Strindberg's Den Starkare opposite Mikael Persbrandt in 2004.

Radio

In 1997, the Swedish Radio P1 featured Flinck in the presentation of a novel entitled Mannen i svart ("The Man in Black") for which he won an unofficial Italian international award for his performance.

Flinck also appears frequently on the radio P1 the radio program Dagens Dikt ("Today's Poem"). He has on occasion read short stories and acted in radio theater pieces.

== Music ==
Thorsten Flinck grew up with his twin brother Richard in Huvudsta, Solna. The two, together with some friends formed the band Rockvindar ("Rock Winds") in 1977. Their debut album Första gången ("The First Time") was released in 1980. The band performed in night clubs with heavy rock influences.

In 2002, Flinck formed the music group Flincka Fingrar. The Swedish documentary filmmaker Peter Gaszynski shot a concert film with the band's performances. The film titled Thorsten Flinck: Ett konstnärsporträtt appeared on SVT1 in 2004. Thorsten Flinck released, with Flincka Fingrars his debut album Vildvuxna rosor ("Wild roses") in 2005 featuring covers of five songs by Björn Afzelius, a cover of Lena Philipsson's "Dansa i neon", a cover of Nationalteatern's "Rövarkungens ö", and a Swedish version of "Where the Wild Roses Grow", originally by Nick Cave and the Bad Seeds and Kylie Minogue. Totta Näslund, Ola Salo, and Monica Törnell provided guest vocals on the album. "Min vackre son" ("My Handsome Son") was released as a single. Thorsten also fronted for the blues artist and progressive rock icon Totta Näslund.

In 2008, he formed the band called "Revolutionsorkestern" ("Revolutionary Orchestra") made up of Robert Olsson, Magnus Eugenson, Ulf Wahlberg and Mikael Englund. The act became known as Thorsten Flinck & Revolutionsorkestern, releasing their self-titled album Thorsten Flinck and Revolutionsorkestern in 2011. The album contained new interpretations of works by Townes van Zandt and Nick Cave, as well as pieces from the Sweden as rock music and as ballads. "Långt bort högt upp i det blå" ("Far Away High into the Blue") was released as single.

In recent years, Flinck has often been accompanied by guitarist Kenny Håkansson. Songs are varied with ballads, rock and country, in addition to poems and monologues. The music is written by, among others by Björn Afzelius, Dan Hylander, Ulf Dageby, Plura Jonsson, Evert Taube, Nick Cave, Townes van Zandt, and poetry by Kent Andersson and Dan Andersson.

The album En dans på knivens egg ("Dance on the Knife's Edge") was released in 2012. The lyrics of several of the songs were written by Ted Ström. "Hjärtats slutna rum" ("The Heart's Closed Rooms") was released as single.

Thorsten Flinck & Revolutionsorkestern participated in Melodifestivalen 2012 with "Jag reser mig igen" ("I Will Get Up Again") qualifying for the Final 10 of the show after reaching "second chance" stage and ousting Sean Banan. In the finale, Thorsten Flinck & Revolutionsorkestern ended up in eighth place overall.

He was to participate in Melodifestivalen 2020 but was disqualified just a few days before the semifinal in February, and was replaced by Jan Johansen.

== Personal life ==
His late father was of French-Moroccan descent. He has two daughters, Felice and Happy Jankell, with TV host and reporter Annika Jankell. Thorsten was a youth leader in Solna church 1975–80.

== Discography ==
=== Albums & EPs ===
with Rockvindar

- 1979: På lörda' é re fest hos Catrin (EP)
- 1980: Första gången
- 1982: Lys upp mitt mörker (EP)

Solo

Year	Album	Peak Position	Certifications	Notes
Year	Album	SWE	Certifications	Notes
2005	Vildvuxna rosor	21		
2012	En dans på knivens egg	3		
2014	Till flickorna på upplandsgatan 71	36		

as Thorsten Flinck & Revolutionsorkestern

Year	Album	Peak Position	Certifications	Notes
Year	Album	SWE	Certifications	Notes
2011	Thorsten Flinck and Revolutionsorkestern	4		

=== Singles ===
Solo

Year	Single	Peak Position	Album
Year	Single	SWE	Album
2005	"Min vackre son"	–	

as Thorsten Flinck & Revolutionsorkestern

Year	Single	Peak Position	Album
Year	Single	SWE	Album
2011	"Långt bort högt upp i det blå"	–	
2011	"Hjärtats slutna rum"	–	
2011	"Jag reser mig igen"	38	Non-album release (in Melodifestivalen 2012)

== Filmography ==
=== As actor ===
- 2010 - Fadren (TV series)
- 2010 - Skavlan (talk show, guest)
- 2010 - Teatersupén (TV series)
- 2010 - Spindelgången
- 2009 - Söndagsparty med Filip och Fredrik (talk show, guest)
- 2009 - Hemlös (TV series)
- 2009 - Maskeraden (TV series)
- 2008 - Fordringsägare (TV series)
- 2006 - Uro
- 2006 - Sökarna: Återkomsten
- 2005 - Blodsbröder
- 2004 - Den starkare
- 2004 - Ett hål i mitt hjärta
- 2004 - Zombie Psycho STHLM
- 1997 - Grötbögen
- 1997 - Jag är din krigare
- 1995 - Sommaren
- 1994 - Rapport till himlen (TV mini-series)
- 1993 - Sökarna
- 1992 - Nordexpressen
- 1991 - Charlie Strapp and Froggy Ball Flying High (voice)
- 1991 - Facklorna (voice)
- 1991 - Mord och passion (TV series)
- 1990 - Goltuppen (TV mini-series)
- 1988 - Kråsnålen (TV mini-series)
- 1988 - Strul
- 1987 - Don Juan
- 1987 - Han som fick leva om sitt liv
- 1986 - Bödeln och skökan
- 1986 - Hassel - Anmäld försvunnen
- 1984 - Annika (TV mini-series)
- 1984 - Två solkiga blondiner
- 1984 - Äntligen!
- 1981 - Babels hus (TV series)

=== As director ===
- 2008 - Fodringsägare
- 2006 - Sökarna - Återkomsten (together with Lena Koppel and Liam Norberg)
- 2004 - Den starkare

== Stage productions ==
Year	Production	Director	Actor	Notes
1986	Gertrud		Yes	written by Hjalmar Söderberg
1987	Stags and Hens		Yes	written by Willy Russell
1986	En skugga		Yes	written by Hjalmar Bergman
1988	Spindelkvinnans kyss		Yes	
1990	Amorina		Yes	written by Carl Jonas Love Almqvist
1991	Romeo and Juliet		Yes	written by William Shakespeare
1992	The Night Just Before the Forests		Yes	written by Bernard-Marie Koltès
1992	The Zoo Story	Yes		written by Edward Albee
1992	The Last Carneval		Yes	written by Derek Walcott
1993	Tant Blomma		Yes	written by Kristina Lugn
1993	Pelikanen		Yes	written by August Strindberg
1993	L'Illusion Comique		Yes	written by Pierre Corneille
1993	Bodas de sangre		Yes	written by Federico García Lorca
1993	Mig känner ingen		Yes	
1995	The Misanthrope	Yes		written by Molière
1996	Mr Puntila and his Man Matti	Yes	Yes	written by Bertolt Brecht
1996	The Good Person of Szechwan	Yes		written by Bertolt Brecht
1998	Death of a Salesman	Yes	Yes	written by Arthur Miller
1999	Maskeraden	Yes	Yes	
2000	Fadren	Yes	Yes	written by August Strindberg
2001	The Dresser	Yes		written by Ronald Harwood
2002	Flinck goes Wilde	Yes	Yes	
2013	Så enkel är kärleken		Yes	written by Lars Norén
