= Teleindustrier AB =

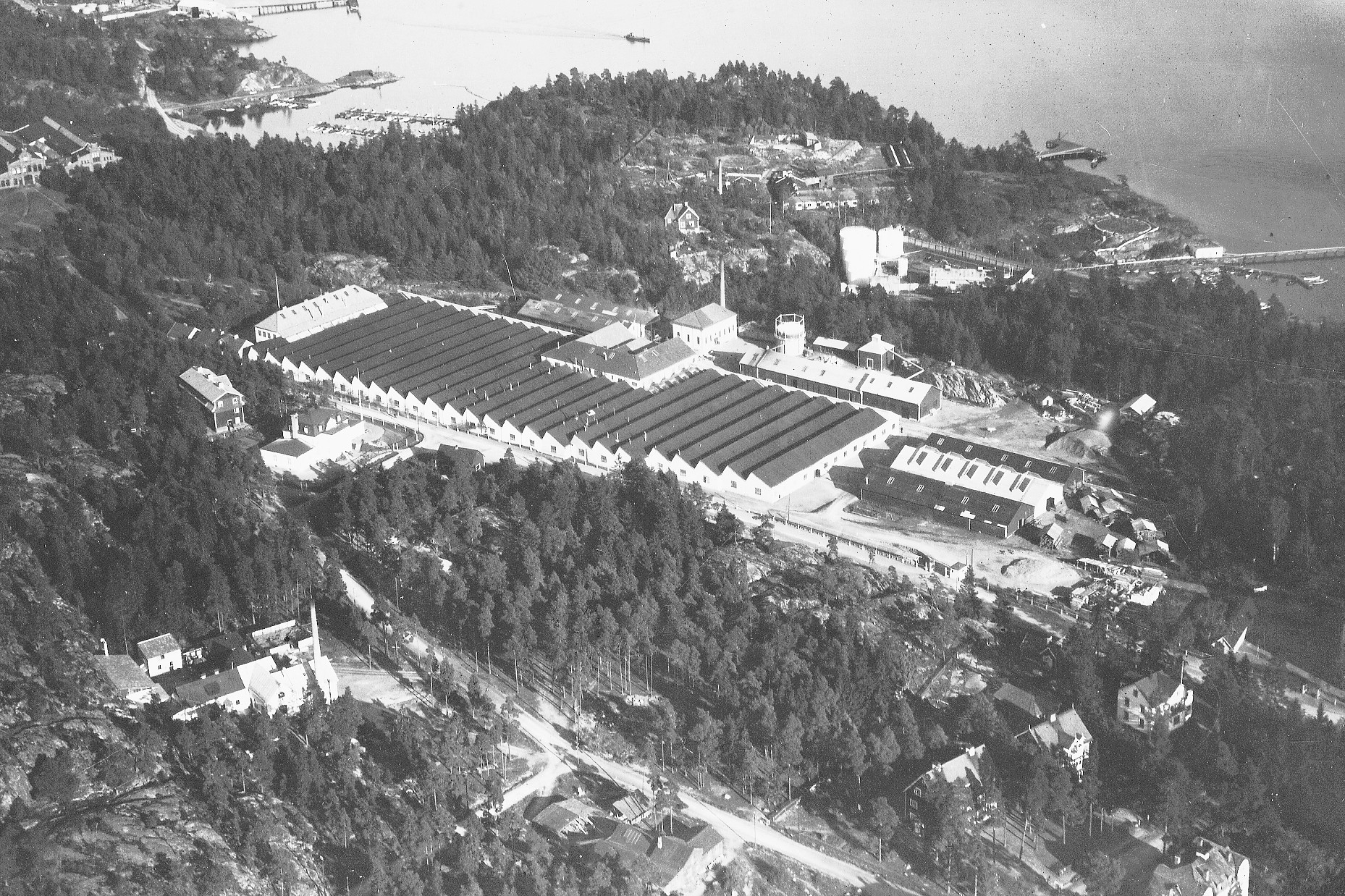
Televerket's factory in Nynäshamn.

Teli (Teleindustrier AB), formerly Televerkstaden and Telegrafverket's industrial division, was Televerket's own manufacturing industry. For 102 years, Teli supplied Televerket with telephone sets and telecommunications equipment for the public telecommunications network, both coordinate dialing stations and digital telecommunications stations, as well as private subscriber exchanges.

== History ==
The first workshop was established in 1891 by the Swedish Telegraph Administration at Fiskargatan in Stockholm, but was moved in 1913, after a parliamentary decision, to new modern premises in the then young town of Nynäshamn when the business outgrew the premises in Stockholm.

In 1940, the business was expanded with a branch in Vänersborg, in 1941 with a repair workshop in Gothenburg and in 1949 with a branch in Sundsvall, where telephone sets were manufactured until the closure in 1989. Workshops were also set up in Kristinehamn and Skellefteå.

Since 1918, Televerket/Teli and Allmänna telefonaktiebolaget LM Ericsson had cooperated on product development issues. From 1970 in the joint company Ellemtel Utvecklings AB.

In 1993 Telia sold Teli to Ericsson and Ericsson took over 5 companies with 1350 employees.
