= Quiet Eye (film) =

2012 American short film

- Directed by: Johnny Hardstaff
- Written by: Ridley Scott; Damon Lindelof
- Based on: Prometheus by: Jon Spaihts; Damon Lindelof; Ridley Scott
- Produced by: Ridley Scott; Damon Lindelof
- Starring: Noomi Rapace
- Production companies: RSA Films; 20th Century Fox
- Distributed by: Verizon Fios
- Release dates: May 16, 2012; October 9, 2012
- Running time: 3 minutes
- Country: United States

Quiet Eye is a short film based on the science fiction action media franchise Alien. Released via Verizon Fios on May 16, 2012, as promotion for the franchise's fifth film, Prometheus, the film was directed by Johnny Hardstaff and written by Ridley Scott and Damon Lindelof, through RSA Films and 20th Century Fox. Starring Noomi Rapace as Elizabeth Shaw, the film follows the scientist as she contacts Peter Weyland with regards her proposed mission to contact the Engineers of humanity, her message intercepted by the Yutani Corporation.

The third short film in the Alien franchise, it received a generally positive critical reception.

== Plot ==
In 2089, before the events of Prometheus (2012), scientist Elizabeth Shaw contacts Weyland Corporation CEO Sir Peter Weyland with regards her proposed mission to follow a signal that may allow them to contact the "Engineers" of humanity. As she does so, her video message is secretly analysed by the Yutani Corporation, who verify her identity via facial recognition software.

== Production ==
As a part of the viral marketing for the 2012 science fiction film Prometheus, several short films revolving around the film's characters in the years preceding the events of the film were released, the third of which, Quiet Eye, would star Noomi Rapace as Elizabeth Shaw, following her as she contacts Peter Weyland with regards her proposed mission to contact the Engineers of humanity, in 2079. The segment was conceived and designed by Ridley Scott and Damon Lindelof, and directed by Johnny Hardstaff, inspired by the English-language "quiet eye" acting test that Rapace had to create for internal use in Fox to verify her stage skills.

== Release ==
Quiet Eye was first released on May 16, 2012 via Verizon Fios, before being physically released with the Blu-ray disc and DVD release of Prometheus on October 9, 2012.

== Reception ==
Russ Burlingame of ComicBook.com complimented Quiet Eye for its "jarring and fascinating" nature in its depiction of facial recognition software, with "the actual ideas brought up [making] it worth watching even if you weren't already foaming at the mouth for more Prometheus", while David DiSalvo of Forbes praised the film as "well done [and] quite creepy", with the accompanying reading materials released with the film making it "great geeky fun". Adam Chitwood of Collider lauded the "seriously eerie musical undertones" of the short, with Maxwell Roahrig of Flixist "commend[ing] the incredible VFX work".
