= Sökarna: Återkomsten =

- Directed by: Thorsten Flinck; Liam Norberg; Lena Koppel
- Written by: Liam Norberg; Mårten Skogman
- Produced by: Kaj Ellertsson
- Starring: Liam Norberg; Ray Jones IV; Thorsten Flinck
- Cinematography: Per Källberg; Kjell S. Koppel
- Edited by: Fredrik Lundberg
- Music by: Stefan Ekström; Life Form Area
- Release date: 2006
- Running time: 91 min.
- Country: Sweden
- Language: Swedish

Sökarna: Återkomsten (The Searchers: The Return) is a 2006 Swedish crime thriller directed by Liam Norberg, Lena Koppel and Swedish rock star Thorsten Flinck. Noomi Rapace appears in the film in small role. The budget was 120.000 Swedish crowns. Much of the cast and crew and the plot of the film where recycled from Blodsbröder.

== Plot ==
Jocke is broken out of prison to help his brother pay a debt to the insane kingpin Zoran. Soon he is dragged into an evil spiral of violence and crime.

== Cast ==
- Liam Norberg as Jocke
- Thorsten Flinck as Zoran
- Ray Jones IV as Ray
- Johanna Sällström as Johanna
- Mats Helin as Matte
- Johan Wahlström as Roman
- Reine Brynolfsson as Father Roger
- Lakke Magnusson as Falk
- Thomas Hedengran as Officer Stig
- Matti Berenett as Sven
- Malou Hansson as Hooker
- Ken Ring as Gangster
- Matti Sarén as Zoran's Hitman
- Leif Andrée as Greasy Cop
- Noomi Rapace as Enforcer
- Tommy Sporrong as Cop
- Stella Stark as Zoran's Girl
- Bojan Westin as Enforcer
- Fabrizio Pollo Fiji
- Peter Söderlund as Bodyguard
