= Telegrafverket =

Telegrafverket may refer to:

- Telegrafverket, later Televerket, a Swedish authority for telecommunications 1853–1993
- Telegrafverket, now Telenor, a Norwegian state-owned multinational telecommunications company
