= Televerket =

Televerket is the name of two government telecommunications agencies:

- Televerket (Sweden), former name of Swedish company Telia, later merged to TeliaSonera
- Televerket (Norway), former name of Norwegian company Telenor
