= Stockholmsnatt =

The King of Kungsan
- Directed by: Staffan Hildebrand
- Written by: Staffan Hildebrand
- Produced by: Hillar Loor
- Starring: Paolo Roberto; Quincy Jones III; Liam Norberg
- Narrated by: Quincy Jones III
- Cinematography: Johan Schell
- Edited by: Thomas Holéwa; Carina Hellberg; Fredrik Becklén
- Music by: Quincy Jones III; Karl Dyall; Kasper Blom
- Release date: 23 January 1987 (Sweden)
- Running time: 47 minutes
- Country: Sweden
- Language: Swedish

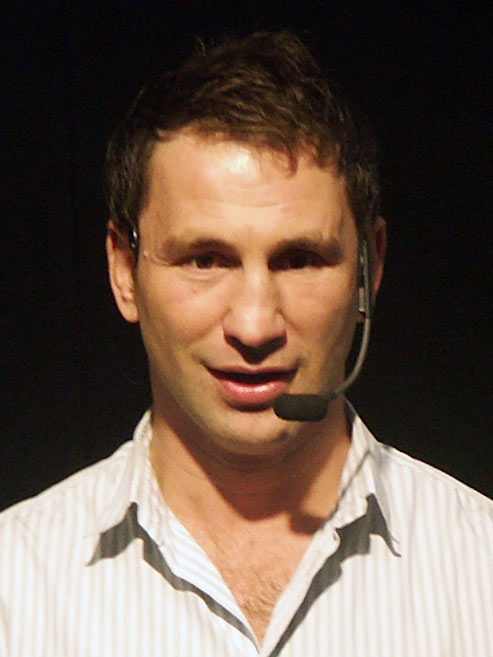
The film is based on the early life of Swedish boxer Paolo Roberto.

Stockholmsnatt (English: Stockholm Night or The King of Kungsan) is a Swedish drama film which was released to cinemas in Sweden on 23 January 1987, directed by Staffan Hildebrand. The film was financed by Televerket as part of their Stoppa sabbet campaign against payphone vandalism.

== Plot ==
The film is loosely based on a true story about Paolo Roberto, later a professional boxer and TV presenter. Because of his Italian roots, Paolo is dealing with an identity crisis. With an admiration of kung fu films and with his teenage aggressions, the kung fu films have a negative impact on him, which tempts him to practice violence on innocent citizens in Stockholm.

The films takes place in Kungsträdgården, which normally is a popular meeting place, but is shown differently in the film because it has been occupied by violent teenage gangs. The film was shown amongst students during the late 1980s in order to prevent future violence between rival gangs. However, the film had an opposite effect on the youth who identified with Roberto, and became influential on the violent "kickers" subculture. It is today regarded as one of the most important cult films in Sweden.

== Cast ==
- Paolo Roberto as Paolo
- Enzo Roberto as Paolo's father
- Ellen Roberto as Paolo's mother
- Ian Roberto as Ian
- Quincy Jones III as Quincy
- Camilla Lundén as Nillan
- Jonas Rasmusson as Ziggy
- Niklas Dahlqvist as Dizzy
- Liam Norberg as Mange (Credited as Magnus Ellertsson)

== Home video ==
The film was released to VHS in 1987 and to DVD on 7 September 2005.
