= Haddy Jallow =

Gambian-Swedish actress (born 1985)

Haddy Jallow (born 14 October 1985) is a Gambian-born Swedish actress who, on 23 January 2007, won Sweden's top film award, the Guldbagge Award as "Best Actress in a Leading Role" for her performance as a teenage rape victim in Säg att du älskar mig (Say That You Love Me), released in Sweden on 25 August 2006.

A native of the former British colony of Gambia, Jallow grew up in the Stockholm suburb of Rinkeby, an area noted for its high concentration of African immigrants, and subsequently moved with her family to Skogås, a suburban municipality with a rural environment.

At the age of 15, she was cast by director Daniel Fridell in a 2001 episode of the Swedish television series En klass för sig, which portrayed high-school life. Her award-winning portrayal came five years later, when she was cast by Fridell in his much-harsher vision of the same setting, playing Fatou, a student who is brutally raped by two of her classmates and is subsequently further victimized by the prevailing culture among students. Her uncompromising performance in the visceral role brought plaudits from film reviewers not only in Sweden, but in a number of other venues throughout the European Union.

After another four-year absence from the screen, Jallow was announced for a leading role in Swedish director Daniel Lehmussaari's horror thriller, Arvet, filming on location in Northern Sweden city of Luleå, with a planned release date of 1 June 2011.
