= Sökarna =

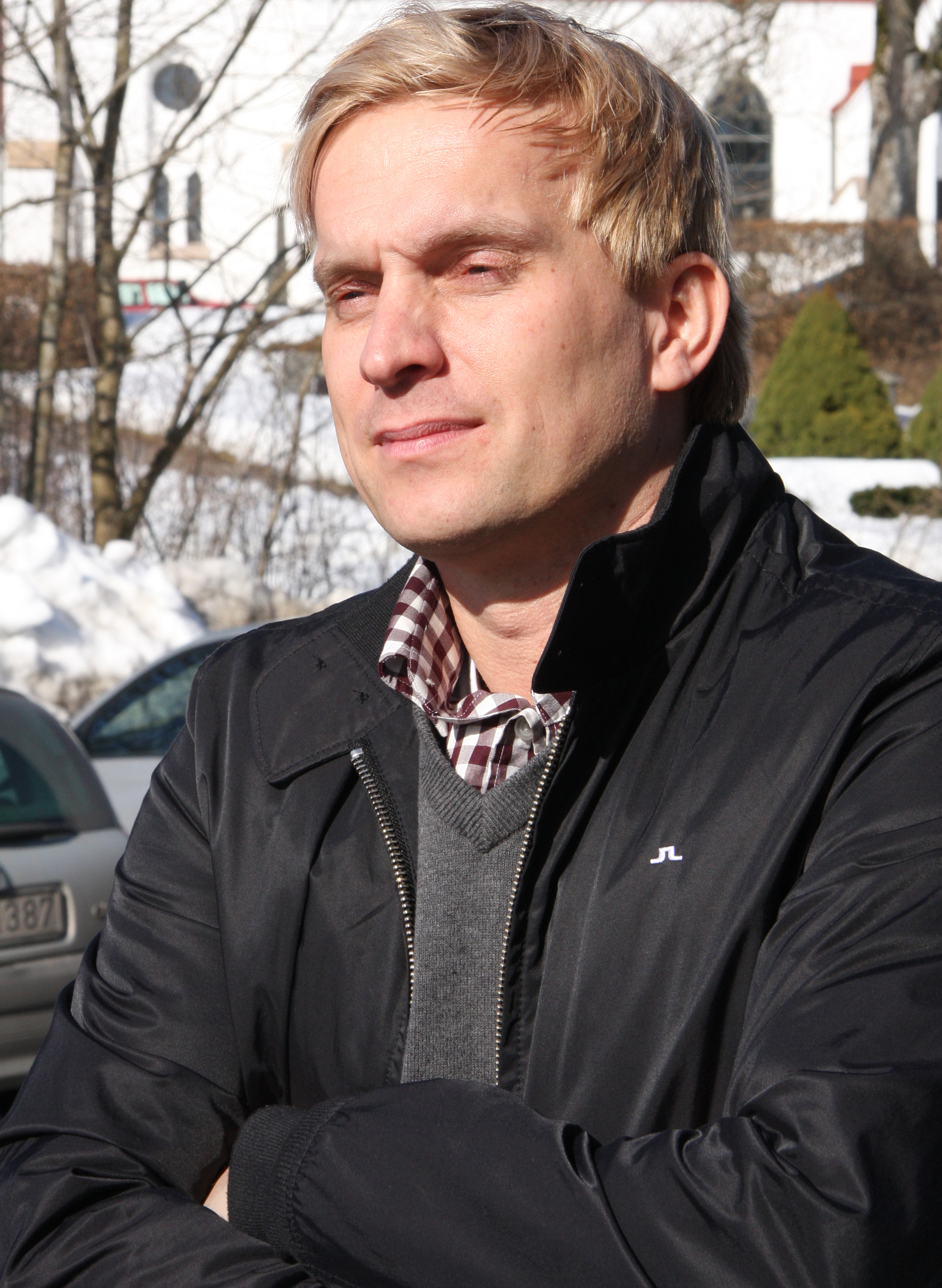
- Directed by: Daniel Fridell; Peter Cartriers
- Written by: Daniel Fridell; Leon Flamholc
- Produced by: Kaśka Krosny
- Starring: Liam Norberg; Ray Jones IV; Thorsten Flinck; Jonas Karlsson
- Cinematography: Sten Holmberg; Yngvar Lande; Peter Mokrosinski
- Edited by: Leon Flamholc
- Music by: Elia Cmiral
- Release date: 26 March 1993
- Running time: 108 min.
- Country: Sweden
- Language: Swedish

Sökarna (literally "The Searchers") is a 1993 Swedish crime film directed by Daniel Fridell and Peter Cartriers. Liam Norberg stars as Jocke, a young criminal who becomes a successful bank robber and drug dealer after serving jail time. The story is set in an alternative, visually stylized Stockholm in the early 1990s. A sequel, Sökarna: Återkomsten, was produced in 2006.

A month before the premiere, Norberg was arrested for a robbery he had committed in 1990 and sentenced to five years in jail. Later, it was also revealed that Norberg had used money from his robberies to help finance the production. The film is considered a major cult classic in Sweden.

The Swedish hip-hop group Infinite Mass gained public attention after appearing in the movie with their controversial song "Area Turns Red," also known as "Shoot the Racist".

== Plot ==
The story is about three friends growing up in Stockholm in the early 1990s. The youths are rebellious with a passion for money and crime. They dream about having money and living the life of a superstar. To achieve this lifestyle they commit certain misdemeanors, property crimes, and various violent crimes; especially against Nazi skinheads, a subculture whose movement had a renaissance in Sweden in the early 1990s.

After participating in a raid on a clothing warehouse, Joakim Wahlåås (Liam Norberg) gets arrested and sentenced to a few years in a Swedish penitentiary. While in jail, Joakim gets exposed to inmate brutality and associates with the heavily criminal Tony (Thorsten Flinck), who introduces Joakim (also called Jocke, or Jocke-pojken) to cocaine.

Shortly after being released from jail, Joakim and Tony team up with Joakim's old friends and begin to commit more violent crimes: bank robberies and drug distribution. The friends quickly become rich and spend thousands of crowns on Versace clothes, champagne, drugs, and women.

A few years later, many women, and plenty of free-base pipes, their lavish lifestyle takes its toll. The friends become dependent on cocaine and heroin. They also begin to distrust each other, and after an argument about the division of profit from a drug trade, Tony kidnaps Joakim's longtime girlfriend, Helen. As Joakim becomes aware of the kidnapping, he begins searching for Tony.

The film ends in a deadly confrontation between Tony and Joakim. Joakim survives the confrontation with Tony, but a few minutes later, Joakim is arrested by the police.

== Cast ==
- Liam Norberg - Joakim "Jocke" Wahlåås
- Ray Jones IV - Ray Lopez
- Thorsten Flinck - Kola-Tony
- Jonas Karlsson - Gurra
- Musse Hasselvall - Andy
- Malou Bergman - Helen
- Per-Gunnar Hylén - Mike
- Örjan Ramberg - Assistant principal
- Per Sandborgh - Porr-Bengt
- Jan Nygren - Principal
- Paolo Roberto - Prisoner
- Caroline af Ugglas - Singer in the street
- E-Type - Himself
- Anna Book - Herself
