= Stoppa sabbet =

Swedish campaign against payphone vandalism

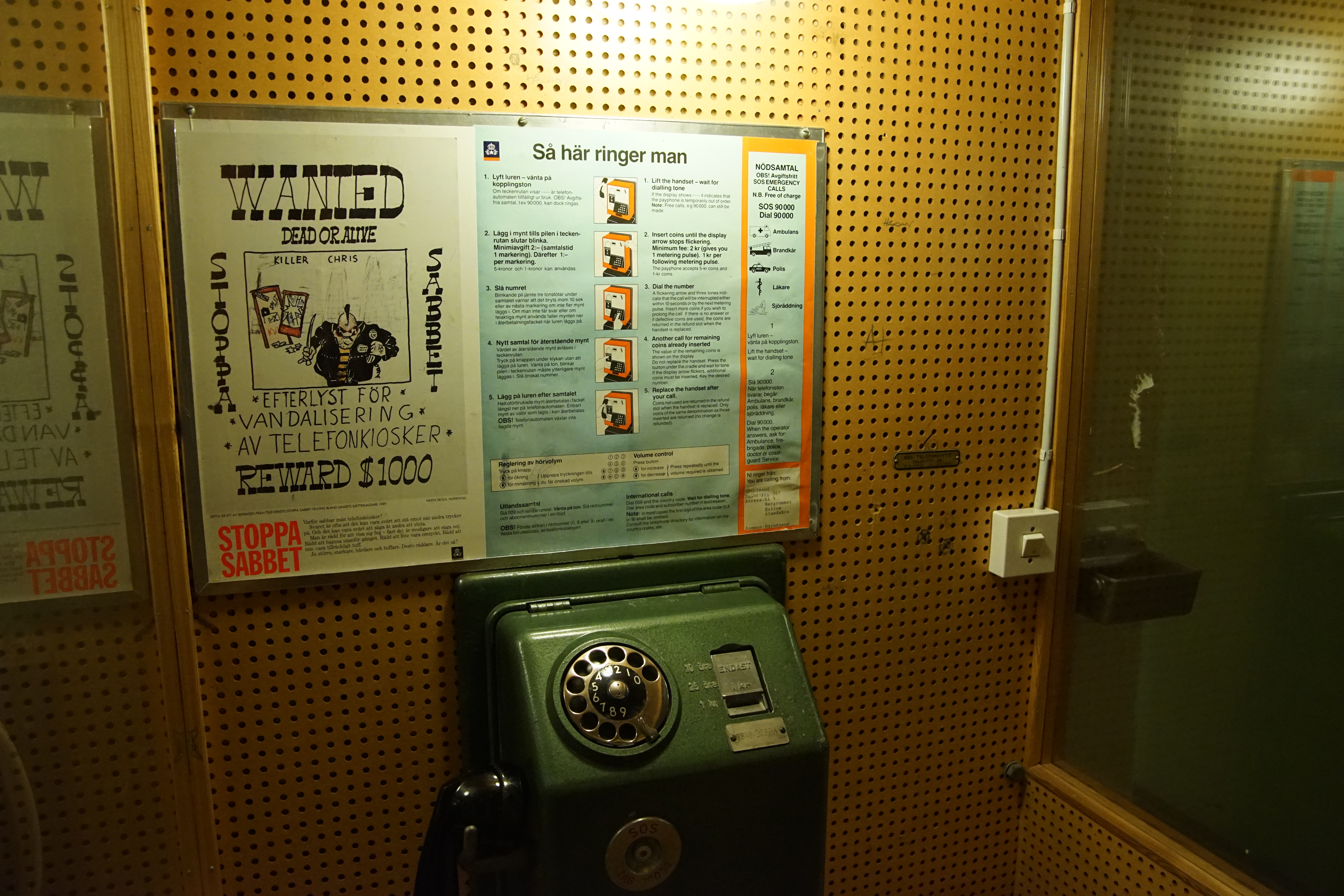
Stoppa sabbet poster next to a payphone in Hemsö fortress

Stoppa sabbet (lit. 'Stop the sabotage') was a Swedish campaign against payphone vandalism, run by the state telecom agency Televerket, starting in 1980. The campaign especially targeted preadolescent children, including an annual drawing competition for 6th graders and various other outreach efforts and sponsorships. Advertising that was part of the campaign was placed in phone books, telephone booths and comic books. Part of the campaign was the funding of the film Stockholmsnatt for 2,000,000 Swedish kronor.

Televerket claimed that the campaign had some effect on payphone vandalism, though costs associated with vandalism remained high throughout.

== Background ==
In 1980 it was reported that vandalism of payphones cost 15,000,000 Swedish kronor to repair each year, averaging out to slightly under kr 400 per payphone across Sweden. Polling showed that the most common vandals were between 15 and 20 years old. Because of this, a campaign was started by Televerket, targeted at preadolescent children in an attempt to reach out before they entered "the worst years". Material associated with the campaign was printed in comic books, advertising posters, and elsewhere.

== Drawing competition and school outreach ==
Televerket had been holding drawing competitions since 1977. A new drawing competition centered around the campaign was announced in 1980, with sixth-grade classes across Sweden being asked to send in anti-vandalism posters. A winning submission would be selected in each telephone district (teleområde), and the class would receive a cash prize. These submissions would then be judged against each other at a national level, where the top submissions would receive larger prizes. Top submissions would appear as posters to be put up by payphones and on the front page of phone books.

Prizes and the selection methods varied over time. For the 1980 entries, the cash prize in each district was kr 1,000; the national submissions were evaluated by a jury, with first place winning kr 5,000, second kr 3,000, and the ten runner-ups receiving another kr 1,000 each. For the 1989 entries, the winning class was selected by a panel of 400 sixth graders, and the winning prize was a week-long class trip to London.

The drawing competitions were part of the wider outreach campaign to schoolchildren, with the drawing competition being preceded by group discussions and material from Televerket such as lists showing the costs of replacing various parts of payphones and booths.

== Stockholmsnatt ==
In 1986, Televerket commissioned Staffan Hildebrand to produce a film as part of the campaign, with the agency contributing kr 2,000,000 in funding to the project, resulting in the film Stockholmsnatt. The film was intended to be shown as part of a discussion about violence and crime and was not initially commercially distributed, instead being shown at schools and other meeting places and distributed along with guidance for teachers and parents. By mid-1987, Televerket claimed the film had been shown to 380,000 young people.

== Payphone 'adoption' and sports outreach ==
By 1985 Televerket had announced the ability for employees in Umeå to 'adopt' a payphone as part of the campaign, including cleaning up spills and littering in the booths as well as monitoring for vandalism and damage. The same year Televerket initiated a program in which local youth sports associations would be given kr 1,000 per year per payphone to perform daily check-ins and report any damage to the agency. By 1988 kr 2,000,000 had been spent on the program. The agency also performed various sports outreach activities, as well as sponsoring several sports events, tournaments and teams, such as Sankt Erikscupen.

The sponsorship arrangement was an inspiration for a similar collaboration campaign by Storstockholms Lokaltrafik with hockey organisations to prevent vandalism and graffiti on the public transit system.

== Ending and effects ==
The last Stoppa sabbet drawing competition was held in 1990, with the 1991 competition having the theme Telecommunication of the future. Televerket was corporatised as Telia in 1993, which would continue holding drawing competitions until 1995.

The campaign may have had some effect on vandalism of payphones, with it being reported in 1991 that payphone vandalism had decreased while other vandalism crimes had increased. Televerket stated to Dagens Nyheter in 1991 that vandalism had continued increasing throughout the 1980s but that the trend had begun to shift, crediting the campaign.
