= Peter och Petra =

1989 film by Agneta Elers-Jarleman

- Directed by: Agneta Elers-Jarleman
- Screenplay by: Astrid Lindgren
- Produced by: Waldemar Bergendahl; Ingrid Dalunde
- Cinematography: Jörgen Persson
- Edited by: Antonia D. Carnerud
- Music by: Gunnar Edander
- Release date: 1989
- Running time: 76 minutes
- Country: Sweden
- Language: Swedish

Peter och Petra is a 1989 Swedish film directed by Agneta Elers-Jarlemann and based on the novel of the same name by Astrid Lindgren.

== Plot ==
Gunnar is in his classroom and has to read a text to whole class, something that Gunnar does not like at all. He does not read very well and the other kids laugh at him.

Suddenly it knocks on the door and two tiny children are in front of the door. They introduce themselves as troll children and tell the teacher that they would like to attend classes. The teacher is surprised by the appearance of the children, but immediately agrees to teach the two.

The troll children, called Petra and Peter, are very popular among their classmates. The outsider Gunnar becomes great friends with them and spends a lot of time with them. He visits them at their house and watches them skating. Furthermore, Gunnar improves his reading.

After the Christmas holidays Peter and Petra are suddenly gone and their house is also empty. The children and the teacher are worried. Then Gunnar receives a letter from Peter and Petra, who explain that they moved because they got a great new house. They also explain that Gunnar is a great guy. Gunnar is happy about the letter. The teacher suggests visiting the troll children during the next school trip.

== Cast ==
- Joshua Petsonk: Gunnar
- Ebba Sojé-Berggren: Petra
- Calle Torén: Peter
- Ann Petrén: Teacher
- Björn Gedda: Janitor
- Babben Larsson: Gunnars mother
- Per Eggers: Gunnars father
- Birgitta Valberg: Grandmother

== Background ==
Peter och Petra was first broadcast on 26 December 1989 in Sweden. Later it was also shown on German television. After that it was released on DVD in both Sweden and Germany.

== Reception ==
Kino.de described Peter och Petra as an imaginative Astrid Lindgren film adaptation, about the friendship of the boy Gunnar with two troll children. It deals with friendship and tolerance in funny, partly contemplative way. Therefore, it is both entertaining and pedagogically valuable.

The Lexikon des internationalen Films opined that the production is worth seeing. It is about the harmony of human coexistence and the power of friendship.

Reinhard Kleber of the Kinder- und Jugendfilm Korrespondenz thought that the film adaptation promotes "friendship and tolerance", without "being too pedagogical". Kleber commented that director Agneta Elers-Jarleman succeeded in presenting these values in such a way that even very young audiences are able to understand them. It also offers the children "more reasons to dream and to have fantastic ideas". The pleasing "tranquillity of the narrative" allows the children to "let their thoughts wander".
