= Per Sandborgh =

Swedish actor

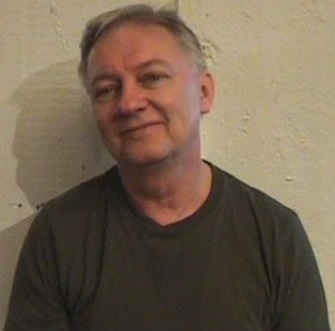
- Born: 30 October 1945 (age 79); Stockholm, Sweden
- Occupations: Actor; musician; translator; speaker
- Years active: 1974–present

Per Sandborgh is a Swedish actor, musician and translator.

== Career ==
Sandborgh is known for his work with dubbing animated films, TV series, and video games. Some of his roles include:

- Joker (Batman: The Animated Series, The New Batman Adventures, Batman: Mask of the Phantasm)
- Egon Spengler (The Real Ghostbusters)
- Top Cat (Top Cat)
- Launchpad McQuack (DuckTales)
- Fall Apart Rabbit (Bonkers)
- Papa Smurf (The Smurfs)
- Eustace Bagge (Courage the Cowardly Dog)
- Ernest Penfold (Danger Mouse)
- Stu Pickles (Rugrats)
- Ironhide (The Transformers)
- Buddy "Clutch" Hawks (M.A.S.K.)
- Huckleberry Hound (The Huckleberry Hound Show)
- Fat Cat (Rescue Rangers)
- Henry Mitchell (Dennis the Menace)
- Chief Quimby (Inspector Gadget)
- Daedalus (Resistance 2)
- Cyril and Mason (The Legend of Spyro: Dawn of the Dragon)
- Homer Simpson (in the short-lived Swedish dub of The Simpsons)

As an actor, he is known for his role as the pornographic movie director Porr-Bengt in the Swedish cult movie Sökarna.

He has translated many animated movies and TV series to Swedish, for dubbing, such as The Simpsons, Flushed Away, Aladdin, House of Mouse, The New Adventures of Winnie the Pooh, Courage the Cowardly Dog, and more.

In the 1990s, he worked as a speaker for the Swedish TV channel TV4, gaining the nickname "TV4-mannen" (the TV4-man).

As an actor and musician during the 1970s, Sandborgh was a member of the Swedish progg band Fria Proteatern.

== Filmography ==
=== Live-action roles ===
| Year | Film | Role | Notes |
|---|---|---|---|
| 1974 | Gustav III | Thorild | Movie made for TV |
| 1979 | Godnatt, jord | The book-keeper | TV series |
| 1985 | Vägen till Gyllenblå! | Skytten | TV mini-series |
| 1987 | Träff i helfigur | Editor Leffler | Movie made for TV |
| 1988 | Kråsnålen | Lordén | TV mini-series |
| 1993 | Sökarna | Porr-Bengt | a.k.a. The Searchers |
| 1996 | Skilda världar | Doctor | TV series, one episode |
| 1997 | Opportunus | Assar | Short film |
| 1998 | Handelsresande i liv | Ottokar von Knieriem | Movie made for TV |
