= Björn Gedda =

Swedish actor (born 1942)

- Born: Björn Roger Gedda; 3 March 1942 (age 83); Solna, Sweden
- Occupation: Actor
- Years active: 1969–present

Björn Roger Gedda (born 3 March 1942 in Solna, but grew up in Boden) is a Swedish actor. He was a stepfather to actress Johanna Sällström.

== Selected filmography ==
- 1977 – Den allvarsamma leken
- 1980 – Mannen som blev miljonär
- 1981 – Gräset sjunger
- 1986 – The Brothers Mozart
- 1986 – Bödeln och skökan
- 1986–present – Hassel (as Simon Palm)
- 1989 – Tre kärlekar (TV)
- 1989 - Peter och Petra
- 1990 – Den svarta cirkeln (TV)
- 1997 – Snoken (TV)
- 1998 – Beck – Monstret
- 1999 – Sjön
- 2006 – Exit
- 2006 – Kronprinsessan (TV)
- 2009 – Superhjältejul (TV, Julkalendern)
