= Beneath the Surface (1997 film) =

- International DVD release
- Directed by: Daniel Fridell
- Written by: Jimmy Karlsson and Daniel Fridell
- Story by: Jeanette Pastoritzas
- Produced by: Daniel Fridell and Sanna Johnsson
- Starring: Johanna Sällström
- Cinematography: Jens Fischer
- Edited by: Fredrik Abrahamsen
- Music by: Johan Söderqvist
- Distributed by: Canal+, FilmhusAteljeerna AB, Nordisk Film
- Release date: 21 November 1997
- Running time: 103 minutes
- Country: Sweden
- Language: Swedish

Under ytan (French: Descente aux Enfers, English: Beneath the Surface) is a 1997 Swedish film directed by Daniel Fridell. A 23-year-old woman has been doing drugs for years and seeks medical treatment. At the clinic, she learns that her boyfriend has recently turned his attention to her younger sister.

The film won Guldbagge Awards in 1998 for best lead actress Johanna Sällström and best cinematography by Jens Fischer. The cinematographer also won 1998 the Camerimage Bronze Frog in Toruń, Poland and also the main award at the Madrid film festival Madridimagen 1998. The director Daniel Fridell was nominated 1998 for the Grand Prix des Amériques at the Montreal World Film Festival.
