= Bloodbrothers (2005 film) =

2005 Swedish crime film

- DVD cover
- Swedish: Blodsbröder
- Directed by: Daniel Fridell
- Written by: Grace Maharaj-Eriksson
- Produced by: Kaj Ellertsson; Daniel Fridell; Mirijam Johansson; Anders Lennberg; Liam Norberg
- Starring: Liam Norberg; Thorsten Flinck; Sofia Helin; Reine Brynolfsson; Thomas Hedengran; Noomi Rapace
- Cinematography: John Hellberg
- Edited by: Orvar Anklew; Håkan Wärn; Jelena Mrdjanov
- Music by: Johan Söderqvist
- Distributed by: Public Art Entertainment AB
- Release date: 2 December 2005
- Running time: 90 minutes
- Country: Sweden
- Language: Swedish

Bloodbrothers (Swedish: Blodsbröder) is a 2005 Swedish crime film directed by Daniel Fridell starring Liam Norberg, Thorsten Flinck, Sofia Helin, Thomas Hedengran and Noomi Rapace. The film released on 2 December 2005 in Sweden.

== Plot ==
30-year-old Jon is released after seven years in prison and decides to put all his criminal activities behind him and start a new life.

== Cast ==
- Liam Norberg as Jon
- Sofia Helin as Malena
- Mats Helin as Matte
- Reine Brynolfsson as Olle
- Thorsten Flinck as Zoran
- Noomi Rapace as Veronica
- Ken Ring as Sami
- Thomas Hedengran as Interrogator
- Bisse Unger as Luke
- Pia Green as Malena's Mother
- Leif Andrée as Guard
- Malou Hansson as Woman in sports car
- Fabrizio Pollo as Papa Fat
- Marcus Rubin as Hustler
- Valerio Amico as Gangster

== Production ==
Blodsbröder was filmed on a very small budget of 500,000 SEK and took three years to make. The movie is an independent sequel to Fridell's earlier movie Sökarna, released more than ten years later.

== Reception ==
Fredrik Strage called Blodsbröder a "total collapse" ("totalkollaps") in a review in Dagens Nyheter. Esbjörn Guwallius, writing for Swedish film site film.nu, described it as a "positive surprise", while noting that many would probably call it a fiasco. Writing for Svenska Dagbladet, Jeanette Gentele called it "exciting, well executed and a little bit amusing" ("spännande och välgjord och även litet rolig") while Jan-Olov Andersson called it "better than expected" in Aftonbladet.
