= Camilla Lundén =

Swedish actress

- Born: Anna Camilla Elisabeth Lundén; 5 May 1967 (age 59); Stockholm, Sweden
- Occupation: Actress
- Years active: 1987-present
- Spouse: Patrick Sommerlath (div)
- Children: Leopold Lundén Sommerlath

Anna Camilla Elisabeth Lundén (born 5 May 1967) is a Swedish actress. She has appeared in more than 20 films and television shows since 1987.

== Selected filmography ==
- Stockholmsnatt (1987)
- Spring of Joy (1993)
