= Liam Norberg =

Swedish actor, writer and convicted robber (born 1969)

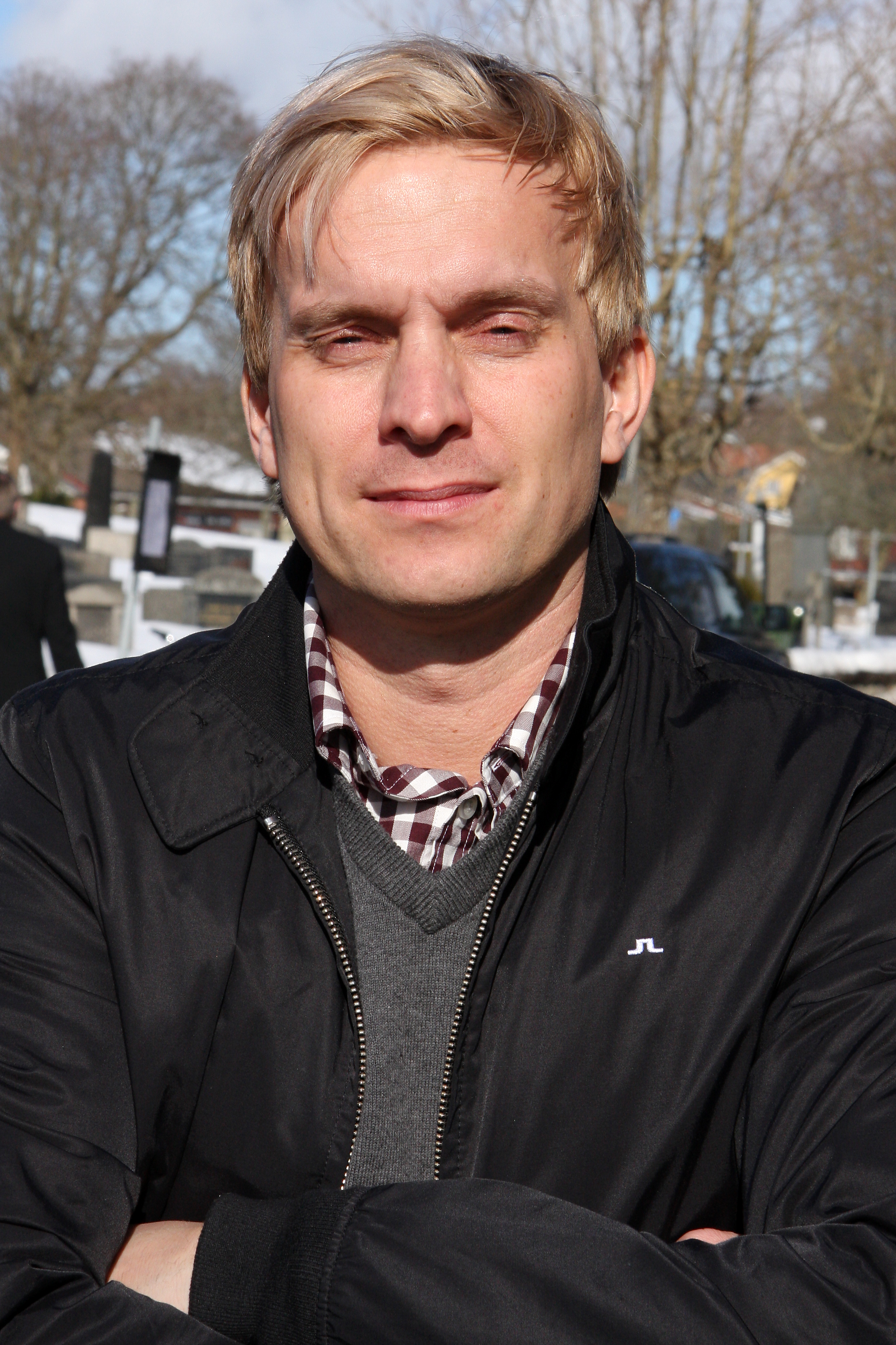
- Norberg in 2010
- Born: Magnus Liam Norberg; 30 December 1969 (age 56); Vantör, Sweden
- Occupations: Actor, author, artist

Magnus Liam Norberg (born Lars Magnus Norberg, 30 December 1969) is a Swedish actor, author, artist, and former criminal. He has acted in several films before and after his imprisonment, such as Sökarna and Blodsbröder. He was involved in two major robberies in the 1990s and served time in prison for both. Since his release, he has lectured about his Christian faith and continued his acting career, as well as writing and publishing several books about his life experiences.

== Career ==
Norberg grew up in Hagsätra, to the south of Stockholm. In 1987 he acted in the film Stockholmsnatt. In 1990, he was an accomplice in the Gotabanken robbery (also known as the 930 million-coup) – the robbery of an armored car which was the largest in Swedish history. Three years later, around the same time as he made his breakthrough in acting in the film Sökarna, he was arrested for another robbery of an armored car which took place three years earlier in Gothenburg. He was sentenced to five and a half years imprisonment. Three years later he was again sentenced, this time for the Gotabanken robbery, to another five years imprisonment. After serving his sentences he was released in 1999. During his time in prison he became a devout Christian. Following his prison time, he traveled throughout Sweden to lecture and talk about his life story. He has continued acting. Publishers Liber published his first book, Liam, in 2005. In 2009, publishers Norstedts förlag released his second book called Insidan.

== Other activities ==
Norberg was the Swedish and Nordic champion in taekwondo, and his role in the film Stockholmsnatt included a fight scene with Paolo Roberto. Norberg is also a graffiti artist, and staged the first exhibition of his artwork in 2008.

== Filmography ==
- 1987 – Stockholmsnatt
- 1992 – Stockholmsnatt II
- 1993 – Sökarna
- 1997 – Under ytan
- 2005 – Blodsbröder
- 2006 – Sökarna – Återkomsten

== Bibliography ==
- 2005 – Liam, ISBN 91-7195-768-5
- 2009 – Insidan: brotten, pengarna, tiden, ISBN 978-9185625666
- 2013 – Sökarnas tid : örnligan, nollpunkten, vägen ut, ISBN 9789113036991
