= Peter Gaszynski =

Swedish photographer (1963–2017)

- Piotr Gaszynski
- Born: 4 April 1963; Warsaw, Poland
- Died: 9 August 2017 (aged 54)
- Occupations: Photographer; Director; Producer

Peter Gaszynski (Polish: Piotr Gaszynski; 4 April 1963 – 9 August 2017) was a photographer, director, and producer based in Stockholm, Sweden.

== History ==
Gaszynski started out as an assistant to one of Sweden's most known fashion photographer Stig "Stickan" Forsberg in 1982. He studied art history and several other courses at the University of Uppsala until 1986 and also has studied at the Stockholm Film School. Gaszynski has worked as a production designer in films, game shows, and television programs.

He has produced and directed several documentaries and worked on a large number of projects for television channels in Sweden.

The art photography of Peter Gaszynski combines digital technology with more traditional techniques. Gaszynski has had several exhibitions with his work including one 2007 exhibition in Singapore in which his photos of Swedish innovations were shown on bus shelters in the city. This was in collaboration with the Swedish embassy and the Singapore Ministry of Information, Communication and the Arts.

His company House Production produces commercials and documentaries for Swedish television "SVT".

== Timeline ==
- From 1982 to 1986 University of Uppsala
- 1985 Establishes House Worldwide interiors
- 1986–1988 Studies at Stockholm Filmschool
- 1988–2003 Working as a photographer, interior designer.
- Opens 3 showrooms in Sweden. Simultaneously working as production designer for film and TV. Also starts filming documentaries under own name.
- 2003–2005 Freelance producer/segment producer for Swedish media companies "Strix" "Titan TV" "Baluba" "Eyeworks"
- 2005 Establishes his own company "House Production"
- 2006– exclusively working with photography and film projects under own name, mainly producing commercials and documentaries for Swedish National TV "SVT"

== Associations ==
- The Swedish Association of Journalists
- Association of Sweden's Independent Filmmakers
- The Swedish Photographers Association

== Filmography ==
Year	Title	Genre
2004	Thorsten Flinck and his Band	Music/documentary
2004	The Last Poet of Rock & Roll	Music/documentary
2005	One Should Send Them Toys ...After the Tsunami	Documentary
2005	Miss Thailand from Sweden	Documentary
2005	Sissel Kyrkjebö Live	Music/entertainment
2006	Madrugada, Live in Oslo	Music/entertainment
2006	Tilles Journey	Documentary
2007	A Swedish Master in Cremona	Documentary
2007	Kidnapped in Baghdad	Documentary
2007	The Swedish Chef at Raffles	Documentary
2008	My Body – Women About Their Bodies	Documentary
2008	My Body – Men About Their Bodies	Documentary
