= Quiet eye =

Period of extended visual attention

Quiet eye (QE) is a period of extended visual attention that helps in optimizing the control and execution of motor skills, particularly in high-pressure situations or tasks that require precise movements. In simple terms, it is a technique reported to improve outcomes in various tasks requiring human visual attention. Some variables relating to QE include location, duration, onset (when it starts), offset (when it ends), and the person's skill level.

Quiet eye has been the subject of several articles in journalistic periodicals, and of scientific studies that evaluate it in relation to activities such as sports and surgical training. A meta-analysis conducted twenty years after the initial QE study was published has identified the QE as one of three gaze behaviours that reliably distinguish professionals from non-experts. Experts had a QE duration on average that was roughly 62% longer than that of non-experts. Moreover, there were 580 QE records discovered in all, demonstrating the region's tremendous expansion in recent years.

The concept of quiet eye is credited to Joan Vickers, who had studied the topic since the 1980s.

== History ==
Professor Joan Vickers is credited as the originator of quiet eye theory, and has been working on the topic since the early 1980s. Vickers examined the gaze patterns of national-level basketball players during free throw shots, finding that expert players maintained a longer final fixation before beginning their movements compared to non-expert players. Hence, the Quiet Eye was initially defined as the tracking gaze that is directed towards a specific location or object relevant to the motor task at hand.

In 2007, the Quiet Eye was defined more specifically by Vickers. It is characterized as the final fixation or tracking gaze fixated within a 3° visual angle or less, at a specific location or object in the visuomotor environment, lasting at least 100ms.

Later, Vickers' research evolved to explore the practical applications of QE training aimed at enhancing performance in different areas, such as sports and surgery.

== Five variables in measuring QE ==
=== Location (cognitive focus and perception) ===
It represents the point where cognitive attention is directed, integrating both visual perception and cognitive processing. In QE, this refers to the spot you focus on right before executing a task, such as aiming at a spot on a basketball hoop before making a shot.

=== QE duration (attentional sustainment) ===
In 2016, Vickers suggested that the QE period essentially reflected the time for organizing the neural networks and visual parameters that govern the orientation and control of visual attention. In simple terms, the Quiet Eye duration was defined as the final fixation on the target before starting a movement, which usually lasts a minimum of 100 milliseconds.

=== Onset (cognitive preparation and anticipation) ===
It indicates the moment the cognitive focus is initiated before the commencement of a motor task. This occurs when an individual mentally prepares their focus before executing a task, highlighting the proactive aspect of cognitive processing. In QE, this refers to the timing of your gaze focusing on that important spot, starting before your movement. For example, aiming before you shoot.

=== Offset (attentional disengagement) ===
This refers to the moment when attention is removed from the critical object or location. This shift marks the transition from focused to divided or redirected attention, signifying the end of a concentrated cognitive effort related to the specific task phase. In this context, QE ends (offset) when the individual's gaze moves away from the critical object or location, deviating by more than 3° of visual angle for at least 100 milliseconds, indicating the conclusion of the focused attention phase.

=== Comparison with skill level ===
The QE durations and onset times differ significantly between skill levels. Elite performers typically exhibit longer QE durations and earlier onsets compared to less experienced or skilled individuals, suggesting that the quality of QE is a marker of expertise.

QE location, duration, onset and offset are all measured using the eye-tracking technology.

== Neural structure behind QE ==
1. Visual Information Processing: When a person focuses on the QE location, the retina captures visual information and sends it to the brain via the optic nerve.
2. Feature Detection and Processing: The visual information arrives at the brain's occipital lobe. The specific regions (V1-V8) in this lobe analyze shape, colour, and motion, helping identify and understand crucial details for the task.
3. Attention Networks Activation: The visual information then activates the dorsal attention network (DAN) and the ventral attention network (VAN). The DAN enables us to focus on essential details by filtering distractions, which is crucial for maintaining QE's steady gaze.
4. Emotion and Memory Integration: Simultaneously, the VAN processes emotional reactions and memories, which affects performance. Ideally, effective QE training enables the DAN to suppress disruptive emotions or memories from the VAN, helping to focus.
5. Motor Response Preparation: Next, the brain's frontal regions use the processed visual and emotional information to initiate motor responses, such as making a basketball shot.
6. Execution and Feedback: Finally, the brain sends commands to act, while the cerebellum and basal ganglia refine the movement, ensuring the accuracy of the action.

== Applications and mechanism ==
=== Mechanism ===
Quiet eye theory can be used both to predict performance, and sometimes, as quiet eye training, as a means to improve performance.

Quiet eye training is hypothesised to work by improving attentional control, allowing greater cognitive effort to be devoted to the principal task and as such improving motor learning and the robustness of motor skills under pressure.

=== Application ===
In 2011, an experiment was conducted to improve visual tracking and performance of athletes by using QE training sessions. Participants were divided into a control group and a training group. The training group participated in 30-minute video feedback sessions that focused on their gaze behaviour when passing the ball. As a result, the training group experienced an increase in QE duration and a faster shot movement time. Their shooting accuracy improved from 63% in the pre-test to 77% in the post-test. This improvement may be attributed to the effectiveness of Quiet Eye training in directing attention to crucial environmental areas, thereby facilitating more efficient motor execution.
