= Noomi Rapace =

Swedish actress (born 1979)

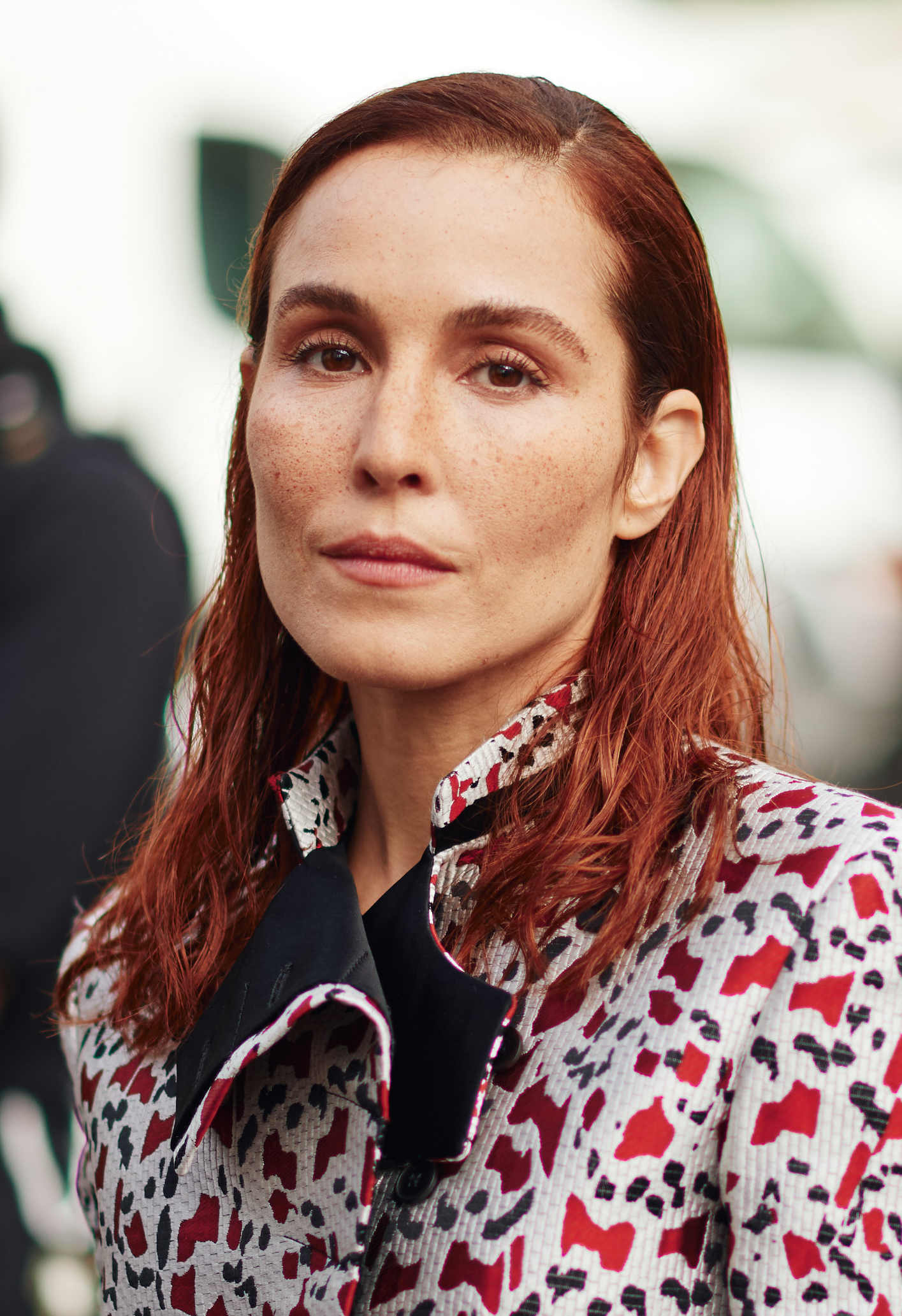
- Rapace in 2019
- Born: Hilda Noomi Norén; 28 December 1979 (age 46); Hudiksvall, Sweden
- Occupation: Actress
- Years active: 1988–present
- Spouse: Ola Rapace (m. 2001; div. 2011)
- Children: 1

Noomi Rapace (Swedish: [ˈnǒːmɪ raˈpasː]; born Hilda Noomi Norén, 28 December 1979) is a Swedish actress. She achieved international fame with her portrayal of Lisbeth Salander in the Swedish film adaptations of the Millennium series (2009): The Girl with the Dragon Tattoo, The Girl Who Played with Fire, and The Girl Who Kicked the Hornets' Nest. For her performance in the Millennium series, Rapace won two Nymphe d'Ors, a Guldbagge Award, and a Satellite Award as Best Actress amongst others, and was nominated for a BAFTA Award, an International Emmy Award, a Critics' Choice Movie Award, and a European Film Award. Following the success of the Millennium series, Rapace has gone on to star in many international movies.

She has starred as Veronica in Bloodbrothers (2005), Anna in Daisy Diamond (2007), Leena in Beyond (2010), Anna in The Monitor (2011), Madame Simza Heron in Sherlock Holmes: A Game of Shadows (2011), Elizabeth Shaw in Quiet Eye (2012), Prometheus (2012), The Crossing (2017), and Alien: Covenant (2017), Isabelle in Passion (2012), Beatrice in Dead Man Down (2013), Nadia in The Drop (2014), Raisa Demidova in Child 44 (2015), Renee in Rupture (2016), Alice Racine in Unlocked (2017), the seven lead roles in What Happened to Monday (2017), Leilah in Bright (2017), Bianca Lind in Stockholm (2018), Sam Carlson in Close (2019), Lizzie in Angel of Mine (2019), Harriet Bauman in Jack Ryan (TV series, 2019), Maja in The Secrets We Keep (2020), Maria in Lamb (2021), Lisa in The Trip (2021), Bosilka in You Won't Be Alone (2022), Caroline Edh in Black Crab (2022), Elizabeth Thurman in Django (TV series, 2023), Falk in Assassin Club (2023), Jo Ericsson in Constellation (TV series, 2024), and Mother Teresa in Mother (2025).

== Early life ==
Rapace was born in Hudiksvall, Sweden. Her mother, Kristina "Nina" Norén (born 1954), is a Swedish actress, and her father, Rogelio Durán (10 November 1953 – 4 November 2006), was a Spanish flamenco singer from Badajoz. She has said her father may have been of partly Roma descent, and though she is "not sure if it is true," she has "always been interested in the culture." Rapace's sister, Særún Norén, is a photographer.

Rapace has said she saw her father only occasionally before his death. "He was not around. The first time I saw him or I met him, I was fifteen and I saw him on stage," Rapace said about her father. At age five, she moved from her native Sweden to Flúðir in Iceland with her mother and stepfather, Hrafnkell Karlsson. Two years later, she made her film debut in a minor role in the Icelandic film In the Shadow of the Raven, along with Karlsson. She says, "I came from a poor farm, I'm not educated, no one opened doors for me, I don't come from money."

Rapace speaks fluent Icelandic, Danish, Norwegian, and English, in addition to her native Swedish.

== Career ==
=== Early work ===
At the age of seven, Rapace was given her first film role, a non-speaking part in the Icelandic film In the Shadow of the Raven by Hrafn Gunnlaugsson. This experience prompted her to be an actress. She left home at age 15 and enrolled in a Stockholm theatre school.

In 1996, Rapace (then Noomi Norén) made her television debut playing the part of Lucinda Gonzales in the long-running soap opera series Tre kronor. From 1998 to 1999, Rapace studied at the acting school Skara Skolscen. She has been engaged at Theater Plaza in 2000–01, Orion Theatre in 2001, Teater Galeasen in 2002, Stockholm City Theatre in 2003, as well as at the Royal Dramatic Theatre, all in Stockholm.

In 2007, she won acclaim for her award-winning portrayal of a troubled teen mother in the Danish film Daisy Diamond, directed by Simon Staho. She won the two top film awards in Denmark (the Bodil and Robert prize) for Best Actress for her role in the film, which was also selected for the main competition at the San Sebastián International Film Festival.

In 2009, she played the role of Lisbeth Salander in the Swedish-produced film adaptation of Stieg Larsson's best-selling novel The Girl with the Dragon Tattoo, for which she won the Best Actress trophy at Guldbagge Award (Sweden's top film award) and Satellite Award, and was nominated for a BAFTA Award and European Film Award in the same category. She later appeared in the same role in the sequels The Girl Who Played with Fire and The Girl Who Kicked the Hornets' Nest. All three films were subsequently recut as a six-part miniseries aired on Swedish television called Millennium, for which Rapace received a nomination for the International Emmy Award. The three film adaptations have earned over $200 million at the box office worldwide.

=== International success ===
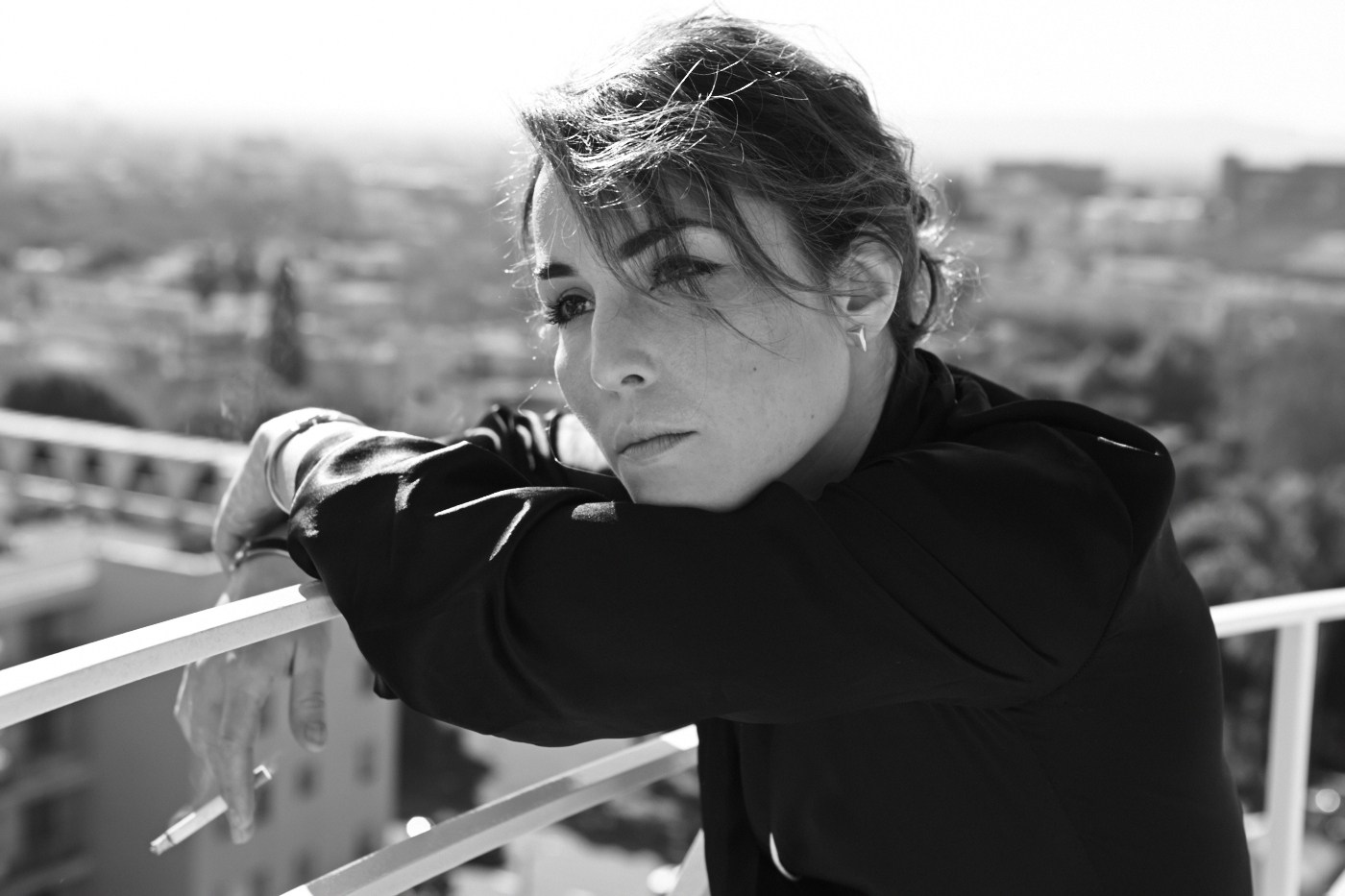
Rapace in Los Angeles, 2015

Following the success of the Millennium series, Rapace started an international career. Her first English-speaking role was the character of Madame Simza Heron in Guy Ritchie's Sherlock Holmes: A Game of Shadows, released in 2011.

Her international fame has earned her leading roles in mainstream cinema. She was cast in Ridley Scott's blockbuster hit Prometheus, where she played the leading role, a scientist named Elizabeth Shaw. She had met Scott for the first time following the release of the Millennium trilogy movies, at which point he expressed a willingness to work with her and encouraged her to improve her accent. Prometheus was released in June 2012. She did not appear in the final cut of the film's sequel Alien: Covenant (2017), but did act in a short related prologue.

In November 2012, she appeared in The Rolling Stones video-clip for the single "Doom and Gloom", shot in the studios of the Cité du Cinéma by Luc Besson in Saint-Denis. Also in the same year, she starred alongside Rachel McAdams in Brian De Palma's erotic thriller Passion, which is the English-language remake of 2010's French psychological thriller Love Crime. They both appeared in Sherlock Holmes: A Game of Shadows, but did not share scenes. Rapace also appeared in Niels Arden Oplev's crime thriller Dead Man Down, alongside Isabelle Huppert and Colin Farrell.

In 2014, she appeared as Nadia in Michaël R. Roskam's thriller The Drop, alongside Tom Hardy, Matthias Schoenaerts, and James Gandolfini. In September 2014, she was the subject of the short film A Portrait of Noomi Rapace, directed by artist and designer Aitor Throup and scored by Flying Lotus. In the same year, Rapace appeared in the video for the single "Eez-eh" by Kasabian. In 2015, she starred as Raisa Demidova in Daniel Espinosa's Child 44 opposite Hardy again (her co-star in The Drop), also starring Gary Oldman, Vincent Cassel, Jason Clarke, and Joel Kinnaman.

She starred in the 2017 spy thriller Unlocked, with Michael Douglas, John Malkovich, Orlando Bloom, and Toni Collette, and the science fiction horror Rupture by Steven Shainberg. In 2017, she led the sci-fi/actioner What Happened to Monday opposite Glenn Close and Willem Dafoe. The same year, Rapace played an elf in the urban action fantasy Bright.

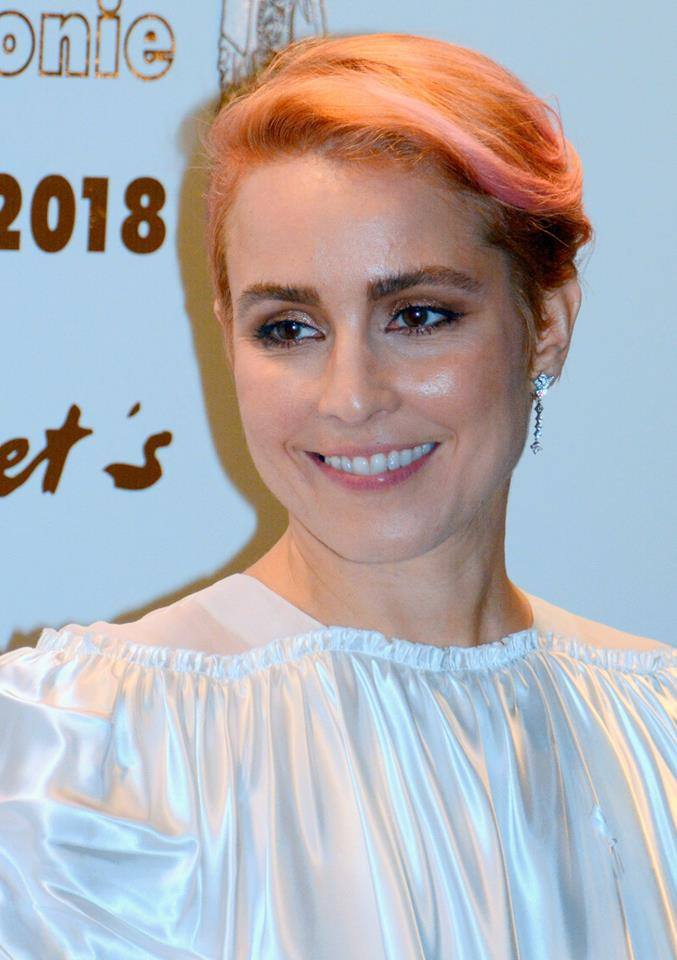
Rapace at the 2018 César Awards

In 2019, Rapace starred in the action thriller film Close, released on Netflix on 18 January 2019. That same year, Rapace starred in the psychological thriller Angel of Mine, and in the television series Jack Ryan. In 2020, Rapace starred in the thriller The Secrets We Keep alongside Kinnaman again (her co-star in Child 44). In 2021, the Icelandic folk horror Lamb premiered at the 74th Cannes Film Festival, where Rapace has the leading role of Maria. Rapace's performance in the film gained significant attention and she won the Best Actress award at the 2021 Sitges Film Festival, and was nominated for the Best Actress award at the 2021 North Texas Film Critics Association. Rapace also has leading roles in the following features The Trip (2021), You Won't Be Alone (2022), and Black Crab (2022).

In May 2022, Rapace was a member of the jury of the 75th Cannes Film Festival. The following year, she appeared in the television series Django (2023), reuniting her with Schoenaerts (her co-star in The Drop). She played the lead role in the television series Constellation (2024) and also portrayed Mother Teresa in the film Mother (2025). In March 2026, she was cast in an undisclosed recurring role in the upcoming live-action adaptation series of the Assassin's Creed video game series.

== Personal life ==
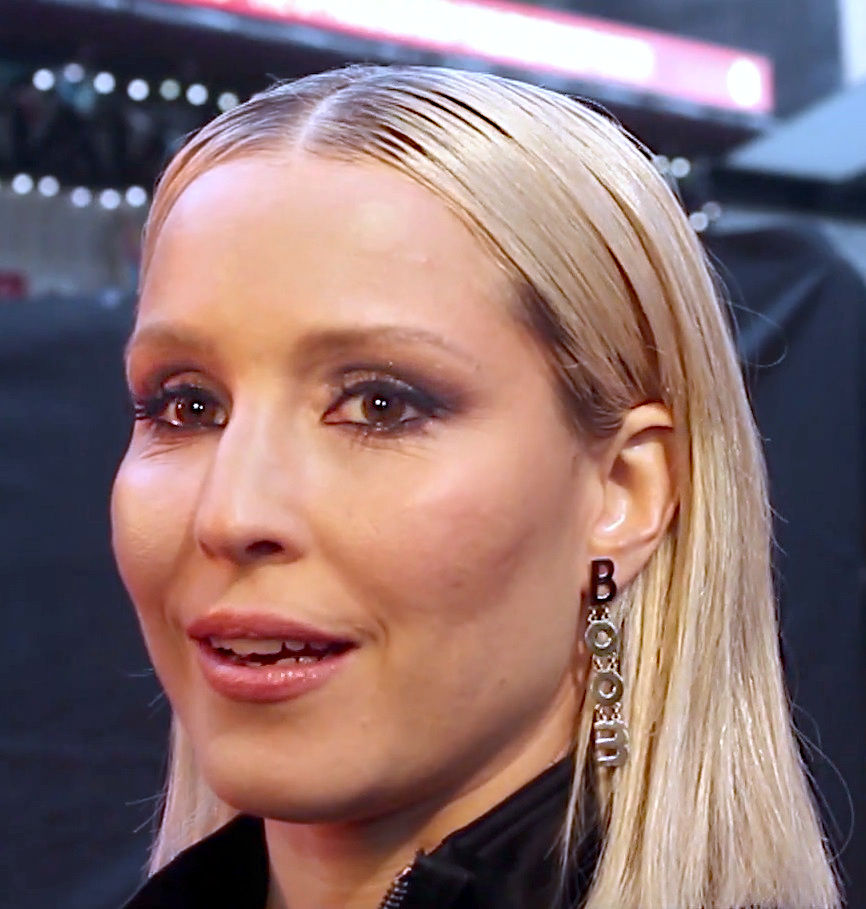
Noomi Rapace at The Drop European premiere in 2014

Rapace married Swedish actor Ola Rapace (born Pär Ola Norell) in 2001. Upon marrying, the couple decided to jointly adopt a brand-new surname instead of one partner taking the other's surname; they did this because their surnames, Norén and Norell respectively, sounded so similar. They decided on Rapace, meaning "bird of prey" both in French and Italian, because it sounded "cool". They have a son, born in 2003. In September 2010, they filed for divorce, which took effect the year after.

As of 2022, Rapace lives in London, England, which she describes as her "favourite city".

== Acting credits ==
=== Film ===
Year	Title	Role	Notes
1988	In the Shadow of the Raven	Extra	Uncredited
1997	Sanning eller konsekvens	Nadja	
2001	Röd jul	Kvinna på krog	
2003	En utflykt till månens baksida	Andrea	
2003	Capricciosa	Elvira	
2004	Älskar, älskar och älskar	Nelly	
2005	Lovisa och Carl Michael	Anna Rella	
2005	Toleransens gränser	Mom	
2005	Bloodbrothers	Veronica	
2006	Enhälligt beslut	Amira	
2006	Du & jag	Maja	
2006	Sökarna: Återkomsten	Enforcer	
2007	Daisy Diamond	Anna	
2009	The Girl with the Dragon Tattoo	Lisbeth Salander	
2009	The Girl Who Played with Fire	Lisbeth Salander	
2009	The Girl Who Kicked the Hornets' Nest	Lisbeth Salander	
2010	Beyond	Leena	
2011	The Monitor	Anna	
2011	Sherlock Holmes: A Game of Shadows	Madame Simza Heron	
2012	Quiet Eye	Elizabeth Shaw	Short film
2012	Prometheus Transmission	Elizabeth Shaw	Short film
2012	Prometheus	Elizabeth Shaw	
2012	Passion	Isabelle	
2013	Dead Man Down	Beatrice	
2014	A Portrait of Noomi Rapace	Herself	Short film
2014	The Drop	Nadia	
2015	Child 44	Raisa Demidova	
2016	Rupture	Renee	
2017	Unlocked	Alice Racine	
2017	What Happened to Monday	Monday "Karen" Settman, Tuesday "Terri" Settman, Wednesday Settman, Thursday Settman, Friday Settman, Saturday Settman, and Sunday "Karen" Settman	
2017	Alien: Covenant – Prologue: The Crossing	Elizabeth Shaw	Short film
2017	Alien: Covenant	Elizabeth Shaw	Cameo
2017	Bright	Leilah	
2018	Stockholm	Bianca Lind	
2019	Close	Sam Carlson	
2019	Angel of Mine	Lizzie	
2020	The Secrets We Keep	Maja Reid	
2021	The Trip	Lisa	
2021	Lamb	María	
2022	You Won't Be Alone	Bosilka	
2022	Black Crab	Caroline Edh	
2023	Assassin Club	Falk	
2025	Mother	Anjezë Bojaxhiu / Mother Teresa	
2026	The End of It	Martha	
2026	In Alaska	Susan Tarheel	
2026	Hot Spot	Rana	
TBA	The Kellys	TBA	Filming

=== Television ===
Year	Title	Role	Notes
1996–1997	Tre kronor	Lucinda Gonzales	Main role; 12 episodes
2001	Pusselbitar	Marika Nilsson	Miniseries
2002	Stora teatern	Fatima	Miniseries
2003	Tusenbröder	Hemvårdare	Episode: "Tusenbröder II – Del 5"
2007–2008	Labyrint	Nicky	Main role; 12 episodes
2019	Jack Ryan	Harriet "Harry" Baumann	Recurring role
2023	Django	Elizabeth Thurman / The Lady	Miniseries; main role
2024	Constellation	Jo Ericsson	Main role
TBA	Assassin's Creed	TBA	Recurring role

=== Music videos ===
Year	Video	Artist	Notes
2012	"Doom and Gloom"	The Rolling Stones	
2014	"Eez-eh"	Kasabian	

== Awards and nominations ==
Year	Award	Category	Work	Result	Ref.
2008	Bodil Awards	Best Actress	Daisy Diamond	Won	
2008	Robert Awards	Best Actress	Daisy Diamond	Won	
2009	European Film Awards	Best Actress	The Girl with the Dragon Tattoo	Nominated	
2010	Nymphe d'Or	Best Actress in a TV-Mini-Series	Millennium miniseries (TV version)	Won	
2010	Nymphe d'Or	Best Actress	The Girl with the Dragon Tattoo	Won	
2010	Critics' Choice Awards	Best Actress	The Girl with the Dragon Tattoo	Nominated	
2010	Guldbagge Awards	Best Actress	The Girl with the Dragon Tattoo	Won	
2010	Houston Film Critics Society	Best Actress	The Girl with the Dragon Tattoo	Nominated	
2010	Las Vegas Film Critics Society	Best Lead Actress	The Girl with the Dragon Tattoo	Nominated	
2010	New York Film Critics Online	Breakthrough Performer	The Girl with the Dragon Tattoo	Won	
2010	Satellite Awards	Best Actress – Motion Picture Drama	The Girl with the Dragon Tattoo	Won	
2010	St. Louis Film Critics Association	Best Actress	The Girl with the Dragon Tattoo	Nominated	
2010	Saturn Awards	Best Actress	The Girl with the Dragon Tattoo	Nominated	
2010	São Paulo International Film Festival	Best Actress	Beyond	Won	
2010	Hollywood Film Festival	Spotlight Award		Won	
2011	London Film Critics' Circle	Actress of the Year	The Girl with the Dragon Tattoo	Nominated	
2011	Empire Awards	Best Actress	The Girl with the Dragon Tattoo	Won	
2011	BAFTA Awards	Best Leading Actress	The Girl with the Dragon Tattoo	Nominated	
2011	Central Ohio Film Critics Association	Breakthrough Film Artist	The Girl with the Dragon Tattoo; The Girl Who Played with Fire; The Girl Who Kicked the Hornets' Nest	Nominated	
2011	Guldbagge Awards	Best Actress	Beyond	Nominated	
2011	International Emmy Awards	Best Performance by an Actress	Millennium miniseries (TV version)	Nominated	
2011	Rome Film Festival	Best Actress	The Monitor	Won	
2012	Teen Choice Awards	Choice Movie Actress – Action	Sherlock Holmes: A Game of Shadows	Nominated	
2012	Teen Choice Awards	Choice Movie Breakout	Prometheus	Nominated	
2012	Amanda Award	Best Actress	The Monitor	Won	
2021	Sitges Film Festival	Best Actress	Lamb	Won	
