= Johanna Sällström =

Swedish actress (1974–2007)

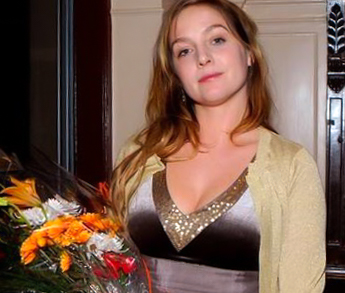
- Johanna Sällström in 2006
- Born: Johanna Maria Ellinor Berglund; 30 December 1974; Hägersten, Sweden
- Died: 13 February 2007 (aged 32); Malmö, Sweden
- Years active: 1993–2006
- Spouse: Albin Sällström (m. 2000; div. 2002)
- Children: 1
- Relatives: Björn Gedda (stepfather)

Johanna Maria Ellinor Berglund-Sällström (30 December 1974 – 13 February 2007) was a Swedish actress, best known for her portrayal of Linda Wallander in Wallander. She worked as an actress for more than 15 years, before her death in 2007.

== Early life ==
Johanna Maria Ellinor Berglund was born on 30 December 1974 in Hägersten outside Stockholm. She attended a Waldorf school and then Södra Latin for upper secondary school. She was the stepdaughter of Björn Gedda.

== Career ==
Sällström made her first stage appearance in Hudiksvall at the age of 15, in A Midsummer Night's Dream. She became famous in Sweden in the 1990s, after portraying the teenage girl Victoria Bärnsten in the soap opera Tre kronor. Thereafter, she appeared in numerous productions, and received a Guldbagge Award for Best Actress in a Leading Role for the 1997 film Under ytan. Later that same year, unable to cope with her new-found celebrity, she took a break from filming and moved to Copenhagen, where she worked in a café.

In 2000, Sällström returned to Sweden to continue her acting career. She co-starred with Jonas Karlsson in Making Babies (2001). Both their performances were positively received by Olov Andersson in Aftonbladet. In 2005, she played the role of detective constable Linda Wallander in the first season of the Swedish TV series Wallander. Sällström's last role was in an Ystad theatre production of Anton Chekhov's play The Seagull, which she left prematurely due to illness.

== Personal life ==
Sällström married Albin Sällström in 2000; they were divorced in 2002, about a year after the birth of their daughter Talulah. In 2004, Sällström and Talulah experienced the December 2004 tsunami while on holiday in Thailand. Talulah died in 2014 from suicide, like her mother did.

== Death ==
Sällström was found dead in her Malmö home on 13 February 2007. She had recently been released from a psychiatric unit where she had been receiving treatment for depression. Her lifelong struggle with depression was exacerbated by her experience in Thailand. In a 2006 interview with the editor of the magazine Tove, she said, "I always thought I would be dead by the age of 30."

Henning Mankell's grief and guilt over her death swayed him from writing the last two novels of his projected Linda Wallander trilogy. Instead, he published a final novel focused on Kurt, before his own death in 2015. The character of Linda Wallander did not appear in the second Wallander series produced for Swedish TV: as another main character had just been written out because of suicide, Linda was "kept" off-screen, but said to be working elsewhere.
