= Televerket (Sweden) =

Defunct Swedish state-owned telephone company

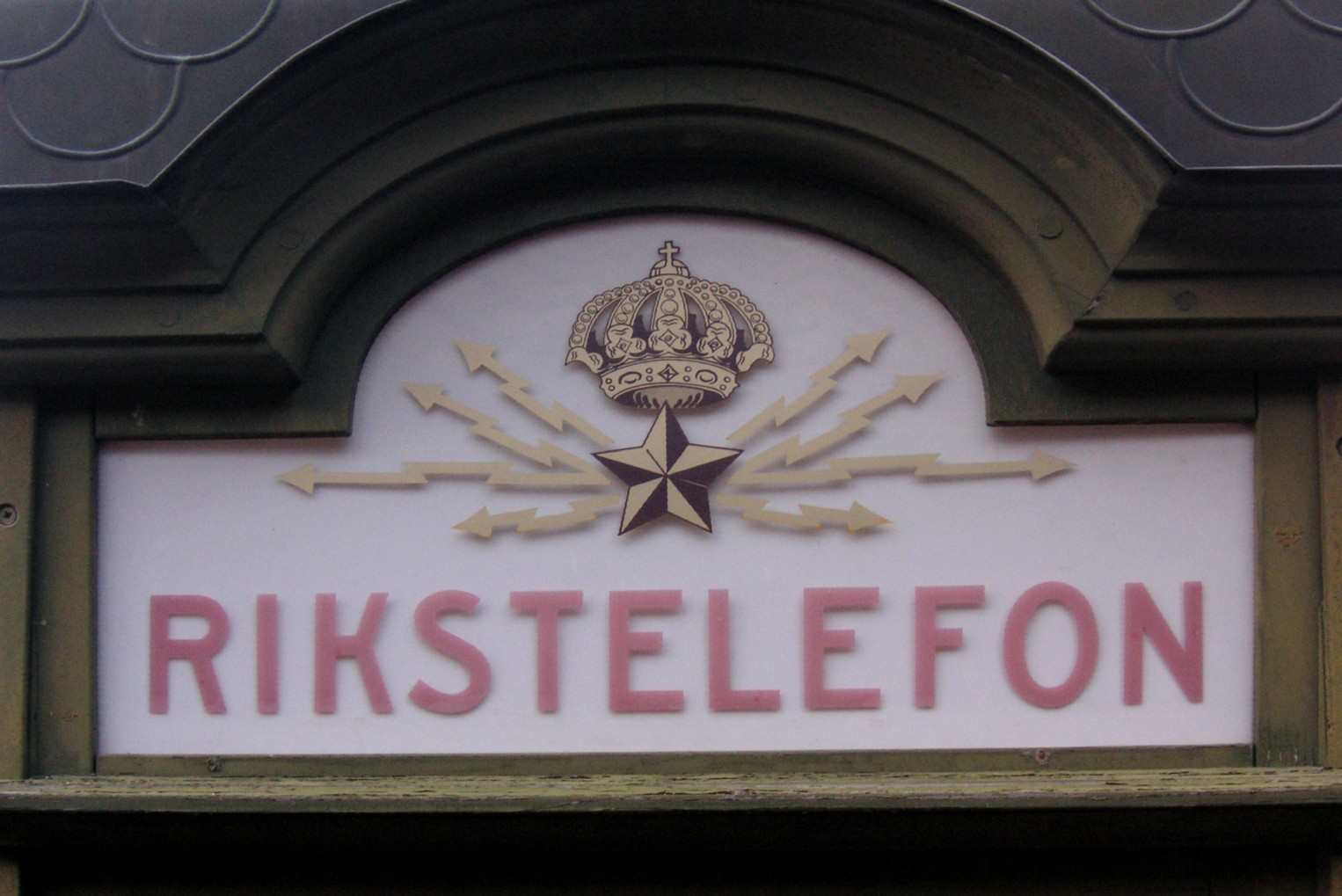
The "Rikstelefon" brandmark of Televerket telephones

Televerket was a Swedish State authority acting as a state-owned corporation (public enterprise), responsible for telecommunications in Sweden from 1853 until 1993. Originally it was named Kongl. Elektriska Telegraf-Werket (literally: Royal Electric Telegraph Agency), which was founded in 1853. Its name changed to Kongl. Telegrafverket in 1871, Kungl. Telegrafverket in 1903, the prefix Kungl. (an abbreviation of "Kunglig", "Kungliga"; English: Royal) was dropped in 1946 and the name was further modernised to Televerket in 1953. Televerket continued on with its telecommunications monopoly until corporatisation in 1993, when it was renamed Telia, now part of Telia Company.

== History ==
=== 19th Century ===
Kongliga Elektriska Telegraf-Werket was founded in 1853 when the first electric telegraph line was established between Stockholm and Uppsala, and was the government agency for telegraph services. From 1871 the company was known as Kongl. Telegrafverket. The first telephone network in Sweden opened in 1880, as a result of an initiative by former Telegrafverket employees. As telecommunication technology changed, Telegrafverket expanded to include telephone services, but entered the early telephone industry in Sweden as a latecomer. Through securing a national monopoly on long-distance telephone lines, it was able with time to control and take over the local networks of quickly growing private telephone companies. Its network, branded Rikstelefon, was supplied with telephones produced by Swedish telephone manufacturers Ericsson.

=== 20th Century ===
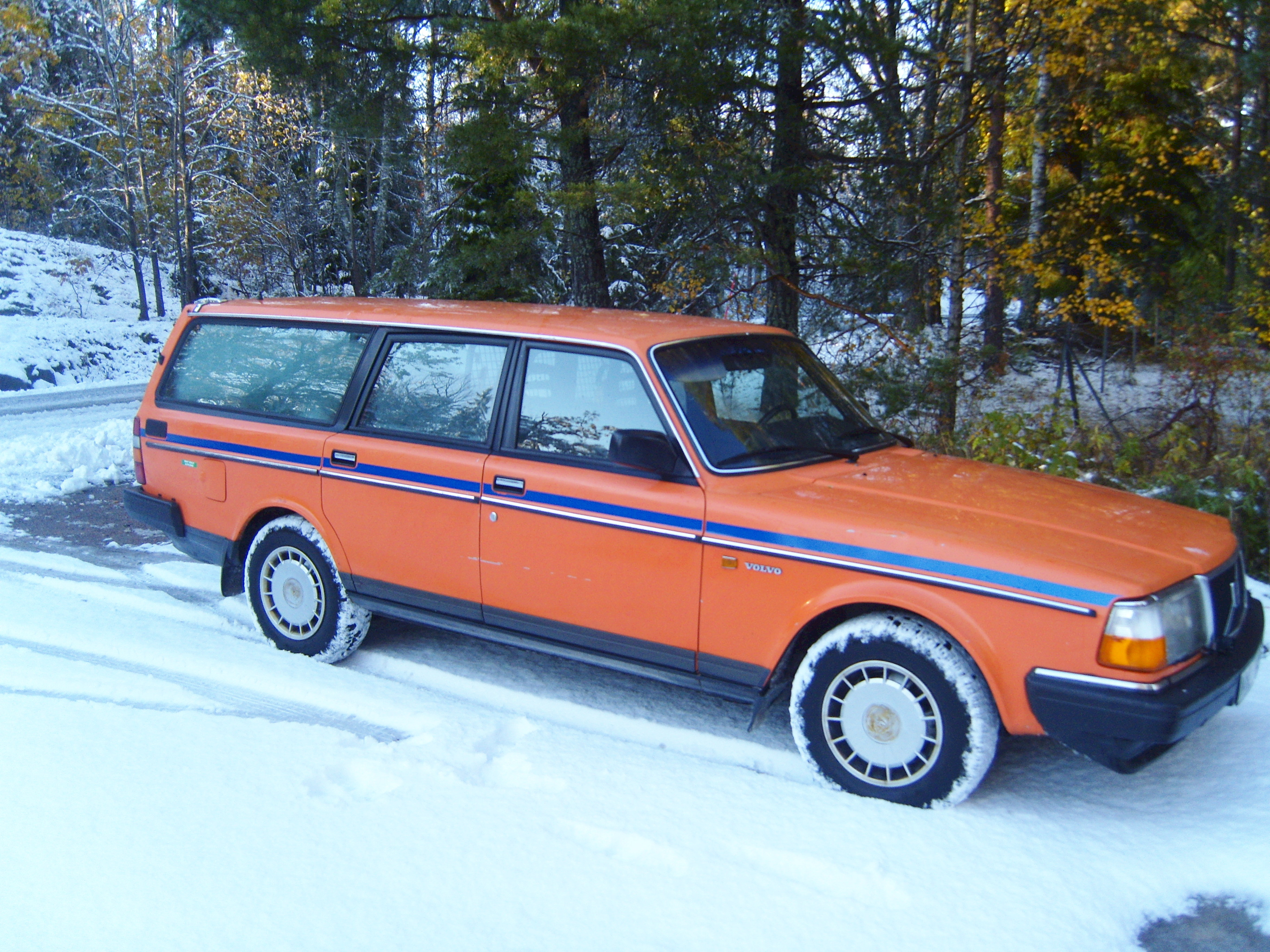
A Volvo 245 GL station wagon from 1988 in its distinctive hi-vis orange livery used as a service vehicle by Televerket and Telia. The blue cheatline was later added to the exterior in the early-1990s after the corporatisation of Televerket into Telia.

While the telecommunications industry in Sweden has always been ostensibly open, Telegrafverket effectively monopolised the market with its purchase of the telephone company Stockholms Allmänna in 1918. When Telegrafverket was renamed Televerket in 1953, the parent company and its subsidiaries had a de facto national monopoly because no other companies had the financial or technical resources to compete. Televerket also pioneered mobile telephony in Sweden; it launched Sweden's first manual radiotelephone service, MTA (Mobiltelefonisystem A) in 1956, which was later succeeded by MTB (1962–1983) and MTD (1971–1987). On 1 October 1981, Televerket launched the first fully automatic (1G) mobile phone network in the world, called Nordic Mobile Telephone (NMT), which eventually superseded the manual MTA, MTB and MTD networks.

From 1980 onwards Televerket's de facto monopoly was eroded with increasing government liberalisation of the industry, as well as early attempts by private companies, most notably and successfully at that period of time by Kinnevik AB, to dismantle said state-sanctioned telecommunications monopoly through its company Comvik. From 1980 the Riksdag enabled legislation that opened the market to allow competitor's telephones to be connected to the network. In 1988 Televerket's subsidiary company Teli, responsible for the design and manufacture of telephones, ceased production. Also that same year, the administration of Swedish television licences, which had until then also been handled by Televerket, was shifted to Radiotjänst i Kiruna AB.

In the early 1980s, a quirk in Televerket's exchanges inadvertently gave rise to the heta linjen, a telephonic group chat that became especially popular among young people and has since been described as an early form of social media.

In accordance with the deregulation decision of the Riksdag and its Telecommunications Act of 1 July 1993, Televerket was corporatised as Telia AB, thus making Sweden the first European country to deregulate its telecom market.

== Televerket in the 21st Century ==
Telegrafverket and Televerket telephones remain highly collectible, and there is now a market for reconditioned phones that can connect to modern networks. Telia has since merged with the Finnish Sonera, and is now known as Telia Company.

== Some Standard Televerket Phones ==
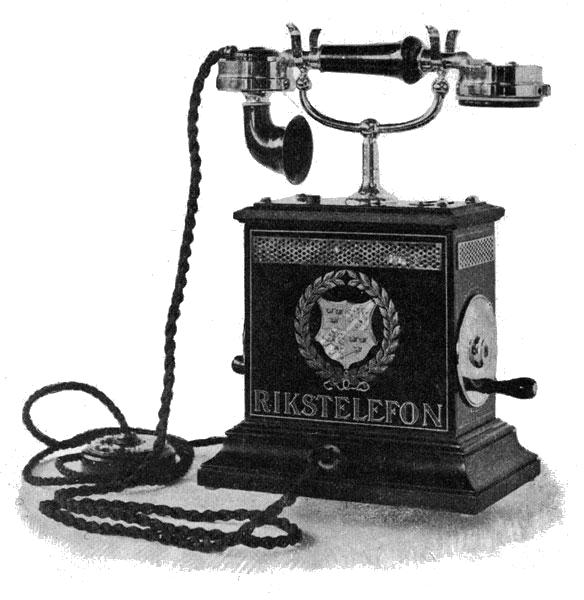
Sheet metal telephone 1894

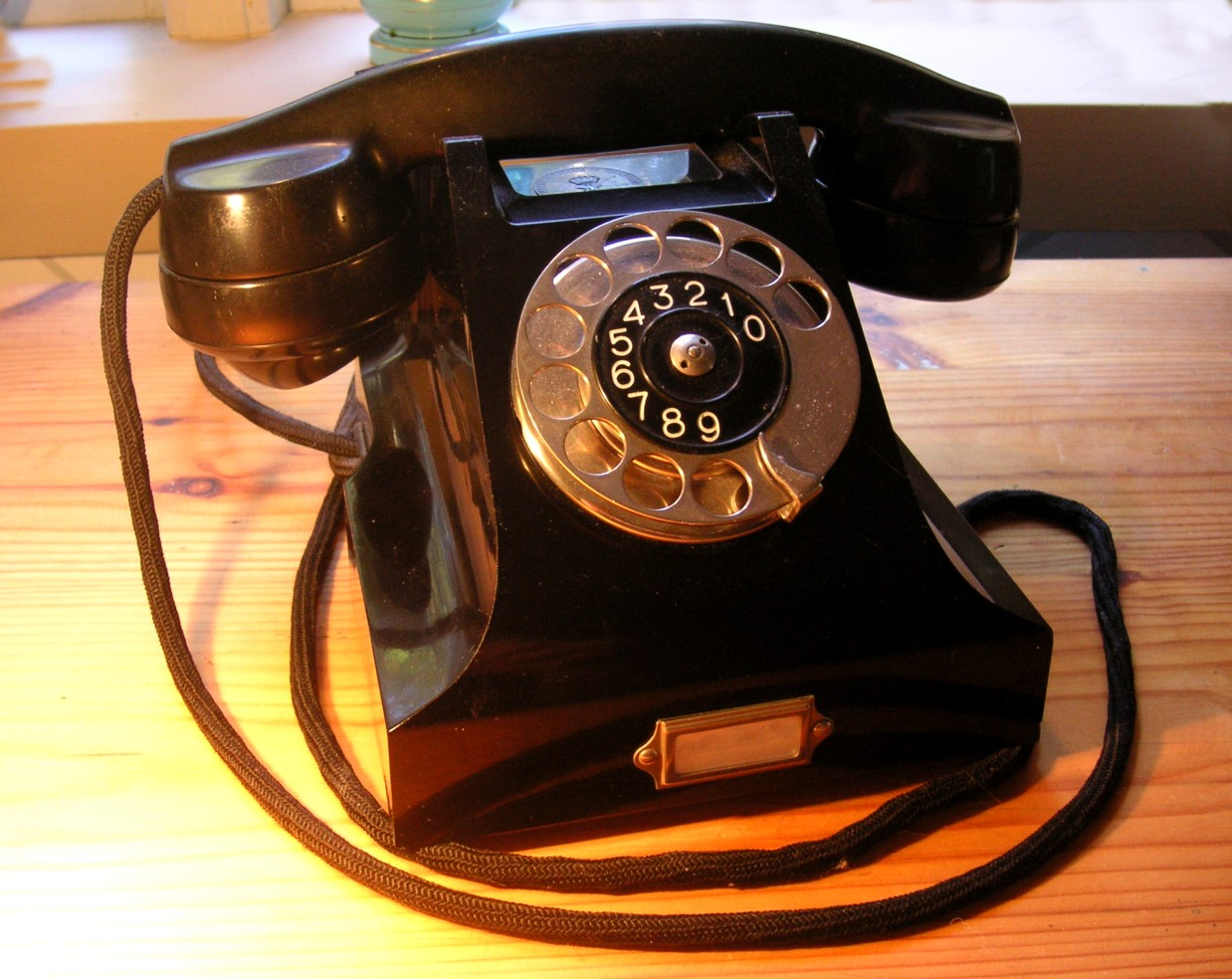
Bakelite telephone 1931-1947

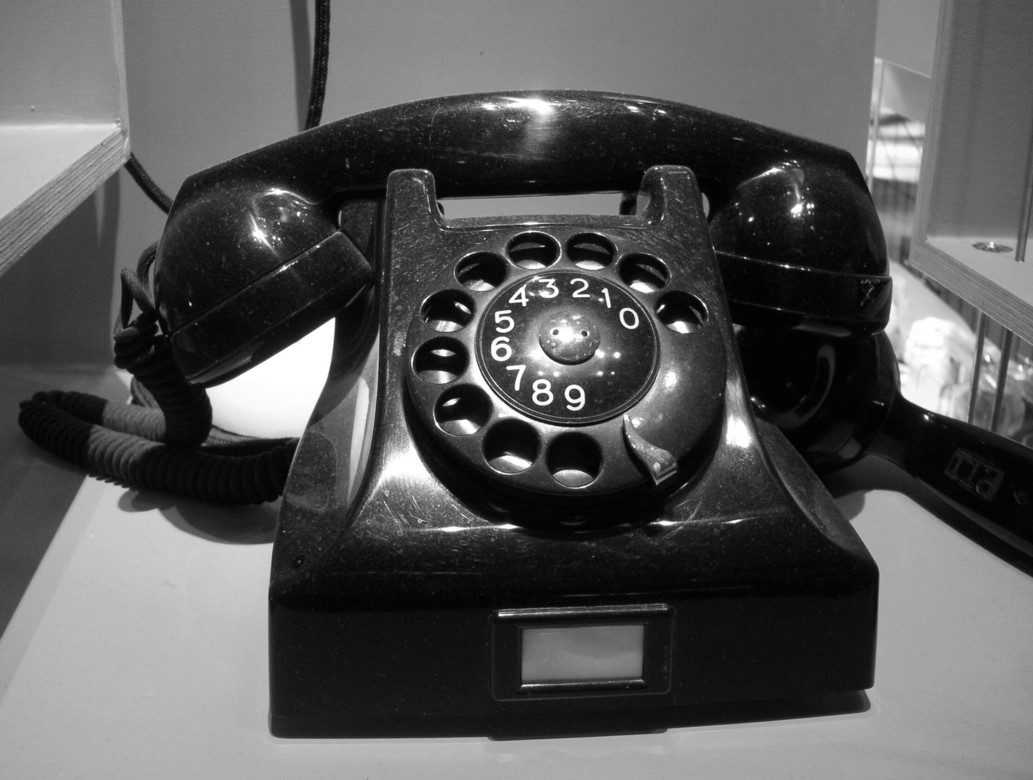
Bakelite telephone manufactured c. 1957

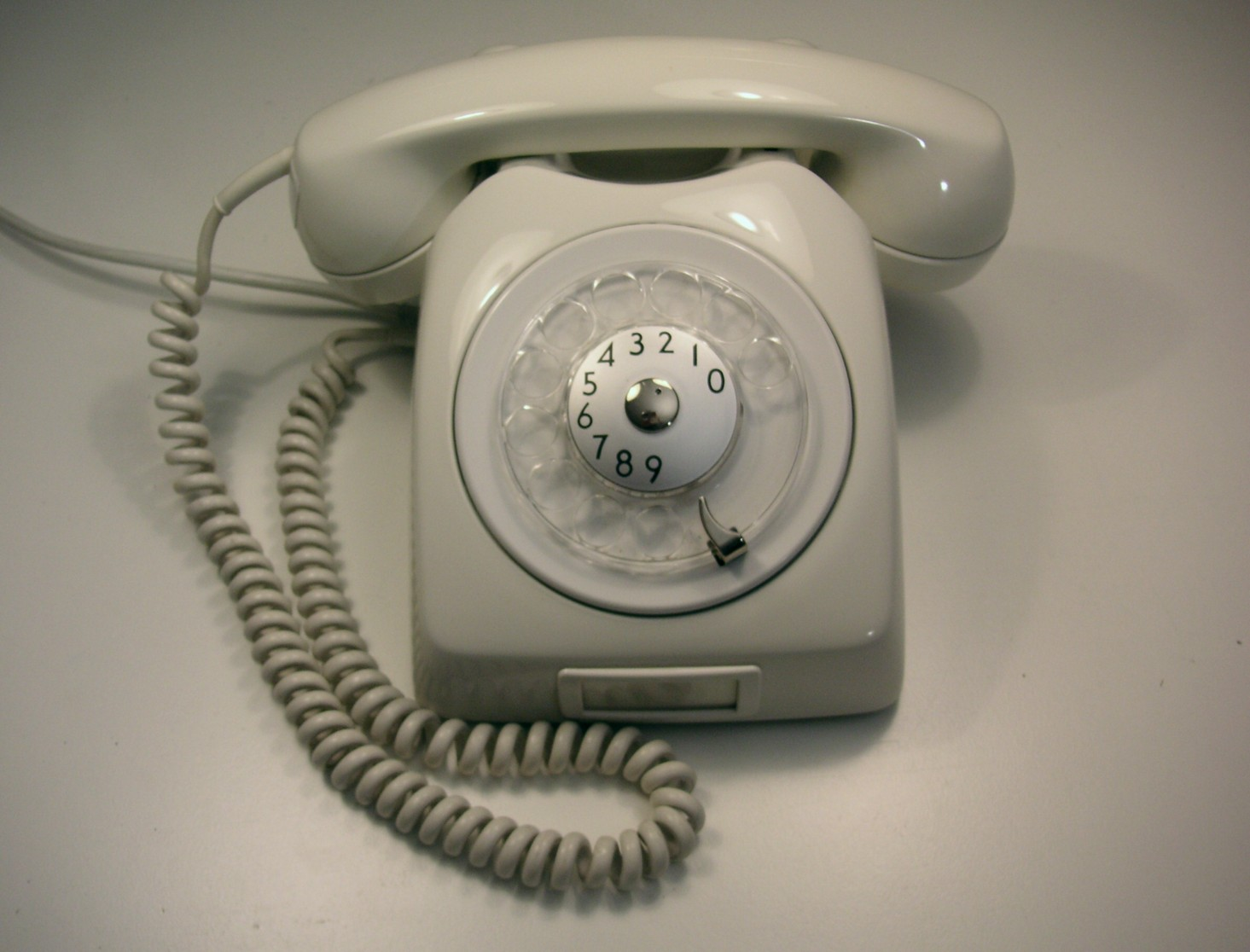
Dialog 1962-1972

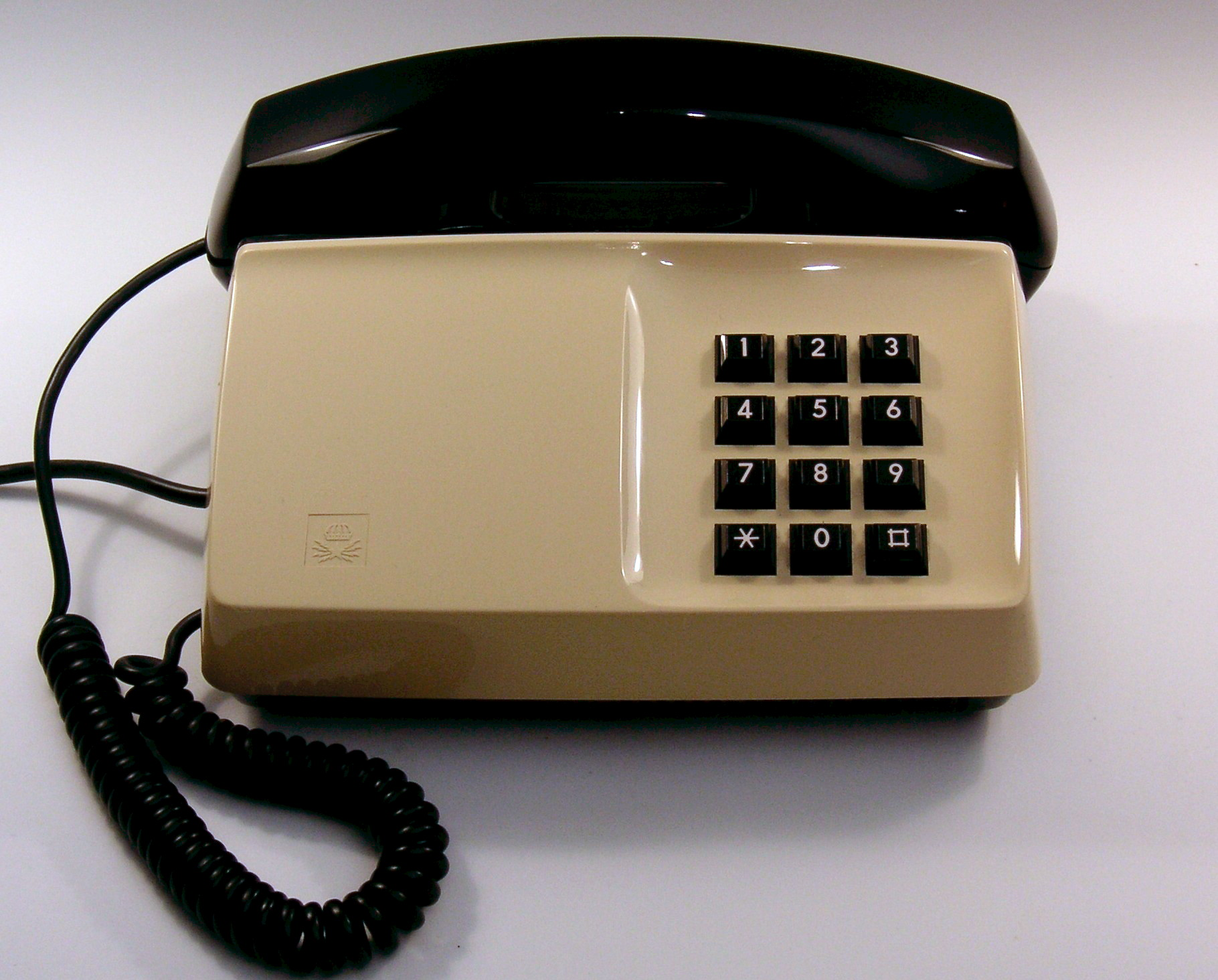
Diavox 1978-1989

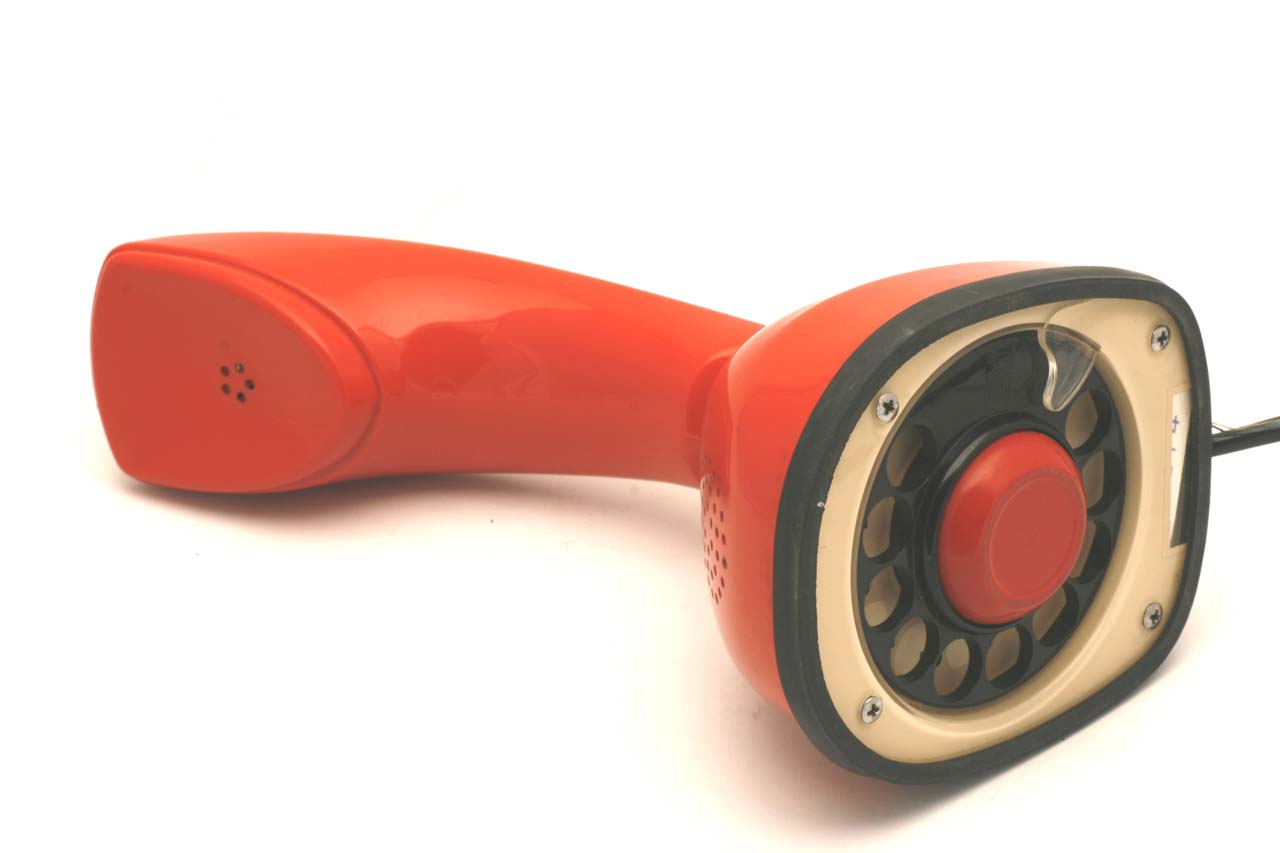
Ericofon 1956–1982

== Company Director Generals ==
- Carl Akrell, 1853–1862
- Pehr Brändström, 1862–1874
- Daniel Nordlander, 1874–1890
- Erik Storckenfeldt, 1890–1902
- Mauritz Sahlin, 1902–1904
- Arvid Lindman, 1904–1907
- Herman Rydin, 1907–1927
- Adolf Hamilton, 1928–1938
- Helge Ericson, 1939–1942
- Håkan Sterky, 1942–1965
- Bertil Bjurel, 1966–1977
- Tony Hagström, 1977–1993

== See also ==
- Stoppa sabbet
- History of the Internet in Sweden
- Swedish telephone plugs & sockets
