= Pharma =

Pharma may be an abbreviation for:

== Drugs ==
- Pharmaceutical drug
- Pharmaceutical industry
- Pharmaceutical Research and Manufacturers of America (PhRMA)
- Pharmacology

== Arts, entertainment, and media ==
- Pharma (album) a 2017 album by vaporwave producer Nmesh
- Pharma (film), a 2006 film written by Ben Sainsbury and directed by Mark Thoburn
- Pharma (TV series), an upcoming Indian Malayalam language web series.

== See also ==
- Big Pharma
- Farma
- Pharm
