= Farm (disambiguation) =

A farm is an area of land or water that is primarily devoted to agricultural or aquacultural processes.

Farm may also refer to:

== Geography ==
- Farm Lake, a lake in the U.S. state of Minnesota

== Types of farms ==
- Dairy farm, a facility for long-term production of milk
- Prison farm, a facility where prisoners perform hard labor
- Truck farm (or market garden), the relatively small-scale production of produce and flowers as cash crops, frequently sold directly to consumers and restaurants
- Wind farm, for the production of electricity by means of turbines
- Solar farm, is a large-scale photovoltaic power system (PV system) designed for the supply of power.
- Antenna farm, in telecom circles, any single area with more than three antennas could be referred to as an antenna farm.

== Arts, entertainment, and media ==
- Farm (album), an album by the alternative rock band Dinosaur Jr.
- Ant farm, a toy to see living ants in
- Farming, a strategy for acquiring resources in a video game; see: Gold farming
- Farm, a character first appeared in the episode "Who Would Win" of the animated series Adventure Time

== Computing and technology ==
- Server farm, a clustered group of computer servers
  - Compile farm, a group of computers used for compiling computer programs
  - Link farm, a website designed to spoof search engine indexers
  - Render farm, a clustered group of computers used for 3D rendering
  - Wiki farm, a server farm hosting a wiki
- Flexible Array of Radars and Mesonets (FARM), a meteorological research service that operates the Doppler on Wheels fleet

== Other uses ==
- Farm (revenue leasing), "farming out" a tax or rent or other revenue, for a governing power to lease to someone the right to collect that revenue
- Farm Sanctuary, an organization which cares for rescued farm animals
- Farm Animal Rights Movement (FARM), an animal rights organization
- Farm team, a team providing experience and training for young players

== See also ==
- Farma (disambiguation)
- Farmer (disambiguation)
- Farming (disambiguation)
- Foundation for Ancient Research and Mormon Studies (FARMS)
- State farm (disambiguation)
- The Farm (disambiguation)
