= Farming (disambiguation) =

Farming, or agriculture, is the science, art and practice of cultivating plants and livestock.

Farming may also refer to:

== Places ==
- Farming, Minnesota, an unincorporated community in the United States
- Farming Township, Stearns County, Minnesota, in the United States

== Other uses ==
- Farming (film), a 2018 British film
- Farming (video gaming), performing repetitive tasks usually for a gameplay advantage
- Tax farming, or farming, the privatization of tax collection
- Farming Simulator, a video game series
- "Farming", a 2026 song by Stray Kids from their EP This & That

== See also ==
- Cultivation (disambiguation)
- Farm (disambiguation)
- Farmer (disambiguation)
- Baby farming, the historical practice of accepting custody of an infant or child in exchange for payment
- Gold farming, gathering currency in a game to sell for (real world) money
- Outsourcing, or "farming out"
- Pharming
