= The Farm =

The Farm may refer to the following:

== Organizations and institutions ==
- Camp Peary, a Central Intelligence Agency (CIA) training facility near Williamsburg, Virginia, U.S.
- The Farm (Canada), a government residence in Canada and home to the Speaker of the Canadian House of Commons
- The Farm (San Francisco), a community center in California, U.S.
- Lewis Farm, an historic home in Charlottesville, Virginia
- Louisiana State Penitentiary, in Louisiana, U.S.
- Stanford University, in Stanford, California, U.S.

== Places ==
- The Farm (Tennessee), an intentional community in Tennessee, U.S.
- Area 51, a highly classified, remote detachment of Edwards Air Force Base, within the Nevada Test and Training Range

== Arts, entertainment, and media ==
=== Film ===
- The Farm: Angola, USA, a 1998 documentary set in Angola Prison
- The Farm (2018 film), a horror film

=== Television ===
- The Farm (franchise), a reality competition television franchise that originated in Sweden
  - The Farm (UK TV series), the UK version
- The Farm (Australian TV series), a 2001 Australian television miniseries
- "The Farm" (Battlestar Galactica), an episode of Battlestar Galactica
- "The Farm" (Flashpoint), an episode of Flashpoint
- "The Farm" (The Office), an episode of The Office (U.S. TV series)
- The Farm, an unaired spinoff of The L Word

=== Literature ===
- The Farm (Louis Bromfield novel), 1933
- The Farm (Tom Rob Smith novel), 2014
- The Farm (Joanne Ramos novel), 2019

=== Music ===
==== Groups and labels ====
- The Farm (British band)
- The Farm (recording studio), a UK recording studio founded by the band Genesis
- The Farm (U.S. band)
- The Farm Studios, owned by Canadian music producer Garth Richardson

==== Other uses in music ====
- The Farm (album), the US band's only album
- "The Farm", a song by Aerosmith from Nine Lives

=== Other uses in arts, entertainment, and media ===
- The Farm (Miró), a painting by Joan Miró shown at the National Gallery of Art in Washington, D.C.
- The Farm, a painting by Adriaen van de Velde formerly in the Hope Collection of Pictures
- "The Farm", the nickname for the Farmington Police District in The Shield

== See also ==
- Farm (disambiguation)
