= Pig Farmer =

Pig farmer is a person involved in pig farming

Pig Farmer may refer to:

- Squealer (2023 film), 2023 U.S. horror film, having the working title "The Pig Farmer"
- The Pig Farmer (short), a 2011 animated short by Nick Cross (animator)
- "Pig Farmer" (episode), 2005 season 1 TV episode of Discovery Channel USA show Dirty Jobs; see List of Dirty Jobs episodes

== See also ==
- Farmer (disambiguation)
- Pig (disambiguation)
