= Farma =

Farma may refer to:

- Farma (franchise), the name of a number of reality TV shows originating with The Farm in Sweden
  - Farma (Croatian TV series)
  - Farma (Czech TV series)
  - Farma (Polish TV series)
  - Farma (Serbian TV series)
  - Farma (Slovak TV series)
- Farma, a trade name of the drug Suramin
- FARMA, a co-operative association of farmers, producers and farmers' market organisations in the United Kingdom
- Renault Farma, a Greek car produced 1983–1985
- Farma (river), a river in Tuscany, a right tributary of the Merse

== See also ==
- Farama, a place in Egypt sometimes spelled Farma
- Pharma (disambiguation)
- Farm (disambiguation)
