= Child 44 (film) =

- Theatrical release poster
- Directed by: Daniel Espinosa
- Screenplay by: Richard Price
- Based on: Child 44 by Tom Rob Smith
- Produced by: Ridley Scott; Michael Schaefer; Greg Shapiro
- Starring: Tom Hardy; Gary Oldman; Noomi Rapace; Joel Kinnaman; Paddy Considine; Jason Clarke; Vincent Cassel
- Cinematography: Oliver Wood
- Edited by: Pietro Scalia; Dylan Tichenor
- Music by: Jon Ekstrand
- Production companies: Summit Entertainment; Worldview Entertainment; Scott Free Productions
- Distributed by: Lionsgate (United States); Entertainment One (United Kingdom); Bontonfilm (Czech Republic); Ro Image 2000 (Romania)
- Release date: 17 April 2015
- Running time: 137 minutes
- Countries: United States; United Kingdom; Czech Republic; Romania; Russia
- Language: English
- Budget: $50 million
- Box office: $13 million

Child 44 is a 2015 mystery thriller film directed by Daniel Espinosa, written by Richard Price, and based on Tom Rob Smith's 2008 novel of the same name. The film stars an ensemble cast featuring Tom Hardy, Gary Oldman, Noomi Rapace, Joel Kinnaman, Paddy Considine, Jason Clarke, and Vincent Cassel. It was released on 17 April 2015. Both the novel and the film are very loosely based on the case of Soviet serial killer Andrei Chikatilo. The film was a box office bomb, grossing just $13 million against its $50 million budget.

== Plot ==
During Stalin's rule of the Soviet Union in the early 1950s, Ministry of State Security (MGB) Agent and war hero Leo Demidov uncovers a strange and brutal series of child murders. However, MGB leadership refuses to acknowledge the deaths as murders because Soviet doctrine states that only capitalism creates serial killers. The son of Leo's partner is murdered by the serial killer and during Leo's investigation, his wife, Raisa, is accused of being disloyal to the state. Leo suspects that his amoral and ambitious enemy in the MGB, Vasili Nikitin, is behind the charges. Leo refuses to support the accusation and he is forced to take a demeaning militia position in the town of Volsk. Raisa accompanies him and must work as a janitor.

In Volsk, Leo meets general Mikhail Nesterov, his new commander. Meanwhile, Vasili calls Raisa and attempts to persuade her to leave Leo and join him in Moscow. When she refuses, Vasili orders a local MGB functionary to abuse her. Raisa later admits to Leo that she only agreed to marry him because she feared what would happen to her if she refused a high-ranking member of state security.

More child murder victims are discovered in Volsk and after Leo tells Raisa that he suspects this to be the work of a serial killer, she decides to help his investigation. Together, they convince Nesterov and his wife, Inessa, that the deaths must be investigated as serial murders. Further investigation reveals that the killer has claimed at least 44 victims and that he is traveling the rail lines to find his targets.

Leo and Raisa travel in secret to Moscow to interview a woman who reported seeing the killer. The interview does not bear fruit, however, and to escape possible pursuit by the MGB, they seek out Raisa's former colleague. However, during the meeting, Raisa discovers that the colleague is an informer and Leo kills him. Leo tells Raisa that she can leave him if she wishes but she says that she wants to stay with him.

Leo and Raisa return to Volsk where they discover that Vasili and his men have pursued them for killing the informer. They are arrested and interrogated, then put on a train to a work camp. During the train ride, they are attacked by the other passengers on orders of Vasili; after killing their assailants, Leo and Raisa jump off the train. They trek to Rostov where the highest concentration of the serial killer's victims has been found; they reason that the killer must work close to the rail yards there.

In the Rostov tractor factory, Leo identifies Vladimir Malevich as the killer by cross-referencing worker travel with the location and date of the murders. Leo and Raisa corner Malevich who surrenders to them. However, Malevich is suddenly shot in the head by Vasili, who has followed Leo and Raisa. Vasili tries to execute them, but after a vicious struggle, they kill him. Leo cleverly tells the MGB agents who arrive that Malevich killed Vasili and that he then shot the killer. Because Malevich was a POW in German camps, the MGB is able to (falsely) explain away his actions as those of a Nazi agent.

Leo is reinstated in Moscow; despite being offered a promising political position, he instead asks to create and lead a homicide division in Moscow. Leo and Raisa adopt two orphan girls (the same orphan girls whose parents were executed by Vasili).

== Cast ==
- Tom Hardy as Captain Leo Demidov
- Gary Oldman as Colonel Mikhail Nesterov
- Noomi Rapace as Raisa Demidova
- Jason Clarke as Anatoly Brodsky
- Vincent Cassel as Major Kuzmin
- Joel Kinnaman as Senior Lieutenant (later Captain) Vasili Nikitin
- Paddy Considine as Vladimir Malevich
- Fares Fares as Lieutenant Alexei Andreyev
- Mark Lewis Jones as Tortoise
- Nikolaj Lie Kaas as Ivan Sukov
- Charles Dance as Major Grachev
- Tara Fitzgerald as Inessa Nesterova
- Josef Altin as Alexander
- Sam Spruell as Doctor Tyapkin
- Finbar Lynch as Doctor Boris Zarubin
- Ned Dennehy as The Coroner
- Agnieszka Grochowska as Nina Andreeva
- Heather Craney as Galina Shaporina
- Anna Rust as Sasha
- Xavier Atkins as Pavel
- Sonny Ashbourne Serkis as Artur
- Kevin Clarke as MGB Agent
- Petr Vanek as Fyodor
- Max Rowntree as Andrej
- David Bowles as Volsk Investigator 2 (uncredited)
- Michael Nardone as Semyon Okun
- Fedja Stukan as Sergei
- Anssi Lindström as Alexander Pickup
- Harmon Joseph as Vadim
- Samuel Buttery as Varlan Babinic

== Production ==
Principal photography began in June 2013 in the cities of Prague, Ostrava, and Kladno in the Czech Republic, and continued in Romania. For the brief scene in the Moscow underground the Prague metro was used. It was the first time in its history that it was shut to the public.

== Ban in some former USSR republics ==
On 15 April 2015, the Russian film distributor Central Partnership announced that the film would be withdrawn from cinemas in Russia, although some media stated that screening of the film was blocked by the Russian Ministry of Culture. The decision was made following the press screening the day before. The Ministry of Culture and the Central Partnership issued a joint press release stating that the screening of the film before the 70th anniversary of the Victory Day was unacceptable. The Ministry of Culture claimed that it received several questions on the film's contents, primarily concerning "distortion of historical facts, peculiar treatment of events before, during and after the Great Patriotic War and images and characters of Soviet people of that era". Russian minister of culture Vladimir Medinsky welcomed the decision, but stressed that it was made solely by the Central Partnership. However, in his personal statement Medinsky complained that the film depicts Russians as "physically and morally base sub-humans", and compared the depiction of Soviet Union in the film with J. R. R. Tolkien's Mordor, and wished that such films should be screened neither before the 70th anniversary of the victory in the Great Patriotic War, nor any other time. However, he also stated that the film would be available in Russia on DVD and online.

The film was also withdrawn from cinemas due to distributor’s decision in Belarus, Ukraine, Kazakhstan, and Kyrgyzstan, while release of the film was postponed until October in Georgia.

Ukrainian film director and producer Alexander Rodnyansky criticised the decision not to release Child 44 as bad for the country's film industry. "Before, films where Soviet and Russian heroes were presented not in the best way have been released in Russia, but nothing similar happened. Now everything to do with history should clearly fit into a kind of framework set by the culture ministry." In Baltic states of Estonia, Latvia and Lithuania, which are EU members, the film was released.

== Reception ==
On Rotten Tomatoes, Child 44 has an approval rating of 30%, based on 84 reviews, with an average score of 4.82/10. The site's critical consensus reads, "There's a gripping story at the heart of Child 44 and a solid performance from Tom Hardy in the lead, but it all still adds up to a would-be thriller that lacks sufficient thrills." On Metacritic, the film has a score of 41 out of 100, based on 25 critics, indicating "mixed or average" reviews.

Writing in The Guardian, Peter Bradshaw gave the film 2 stars out of 5 and reported that "Tom Rob Smith's page-turning bestseller from 2008 has been turned into a heavy, indigestible meal of a film, full of actors speaking English with very heavy Russian accents – actors from England, Sweden, Lebanon, Poland, Australia, almost anywhere but Russia". Bradshaw added: "Tom Hardy brings his robust, muscular presence to the role of Leo and he is watchable enough, but the forensic and psychological aspects are just dull; there is no fascination in the detection process. […] Everything is immersed in a cloudy brown soup". Also in The Guardian, reviewer Phil Hoad wrote: "Child 44 has a fascinating premise and setting [but] failed to convincingly package this as either an upscale thriller along the lines of Tinker Tailor Soldier Spy, as implied by a powerhouse cast also featuring Gary Oldman, Noomi Rapace and Paddy Considine; or as something racier à la The Girl with the Dragon Tattoo or Gone Girl (indeed, the film itself falls awkwardly between these two stools)". Hoad added, "[a]s for the debacle over the Slavic-slathered English spoken by the entire cast, it further highlights the uncertainty about whether Child 44 was intended for the multiplex or the arthouse. Presumably a decision made to placate the former, opting to turn the film into an Iron Curtain version of 'Allo 'Allo! damaged its integrity. Aren't we past this kind of cultural bastardisation? It is possible for foreign-language films to cross over: The Lives of Others, which meted out its own totalitarian intrigue in German, took $66m overseas – the kind of cash Child 44 will never see".

In The Observer, Jonathan Romney found, "In writer Richard Price's boil-down of the labyrinthine original, the whodunit loses all momentum" adding that "the whole thing is scuppered by having everyone speak in borscht-thick Russian accents" before concluding that, "[the film is] shot in several shades of Volga mud and drags like a Thursday afternoon in Nizhniy Novgorod".
