= Paxfire =

Paxfire, Inc. was a startup based in Reston, Virginia founded by Mark Lewyn, a former USA Today tech reporter, and Alan Sullivan. The company filed for bankruptcy in December 2012.

== Technology ==
Paxfire provides an appliance called the Paxfire Lookup Engines (PLE) to internet service providers (ISPs) as a method of generating additional revenue through advertising based on mistyped URLs. By using the Paxfire service, an ISP can redirect mistyped web queries from its clients to navigation pages that may contain paid advertising sources. If a user clicks on a sponsored link, Paxfire and the ISP share the revenue.

In 2011, a research team from the Berkeley-based International Computer Science Institute revealed that technology from Paxfire was also used by several US ISPs to redirect valid search engine queries for certain well-known brand names to an online marketing company.

== Customers ==
Paxfire customers are telephone and cable TV companies, and traditional ISPs both in the United States and other countries. Paxfire is under non-disclosure agreements (NDAs) that prohibit the company from releasing a list of all participating ISPs. According to the Electronic Frontier Foundation, as of August 2011 "major users of the Paxfire system include Cavalier, Cogent, Frontier, Fuse, DirecPC, RCN, and Wide Open West."

== Controversy ==
Paxfire's approach affects all of the end-user's transactions involving the domain name system (essentially all Internet application transactions) rather than just an end-user's web browser. The default behavior will automatically redirect mistyped web URLs to MSN Search. Paxfire's provides 2 methods to opt out of the service. The first method employs an HTTP Cookie and the second method employs IP address filtering at the Paxfire appliance. An ISP is free to make use of these methodologies to ensure that users can opt out, though the cookie method is irrelevant for non-web transactions like email. Security researcher Dan Kaminsky found serious vulnerabilities related to how Paxfire was handling DNS resolution.

In August 2011, Paxfire and one of its ISP customers were sued for the hijacking and redirection of customers' valid search requests intended for Google, Bing, and Yahoo search engines. The lawsuit alleges that results for searches of certain well-known brand names by consumers are not being provided by the intended search engine, and instead are being provided through affiliate marketing networks to earn revenue for Paxfire and the ISP. According to the New Scientist, this practice may be illegal under U.S. law.

A class action lawsuit was quickly filed. Paxfire responded that the basis of the lawsuit was wrong, saying that it would seek sanctions against the lawyers for filing it in the first place. The company filed a countersuit against the law firm, Milberg LLP, as well as the individual, Betsy Feist, who, as a client of Milberg, was the person who initiated the attempted class action lawsuit. Paxfire charged both defamation and tortious interference, demanding $50 million.

In recent movements the company finds itself in a dire financial situation, and with its ads feed cut off from all its suppliers. Recently all direct numbers have been found not working and speculation states that they have closed their support office and are contracting a third party to handle it.
