= Cultivation =

Cultivation may refer to:

- The state of having or expressing a good education (bildung), refinement, culture, or high culture
- Gardening
- The controlled growing of organisms by humans
  - Agriculture, the land-based cultivation and breeding of plants (known as crops), fungi and domesticated animals
    - Crop farming, the mass-scale cultivation of (usually a specific single species of) plants as staple food or industrial crop
    - Horticulture, the cultivation of non-staple plants such as vegetables, fruits, flowers, trees and grass
    - Fungiculture, the cultivation of mushrooms and other fungi for producing food, medicine and other commercially valued products
    - Animal husbandry, the breeding of domesticated mammals (livestock and working animals) and birds (poultry), and occasionally amphibians (e.g., bullfrogs) and reptiles (e.g. snakes, softshell turtles and crocodilians)
      - Insect farming, the breeding of economic insects such as honeybees, silkworms and cochineals
  - Aquaculture, the controlled breeding or "farming" of aquatic animals, plants and algae
    - Pisciculture, the breeding of fish
    - Algaculture, the breeding of algae, particularly seaweeds
- Tillage, the cultivation of fertile soil (etymological meaning of cultivation)
- Land development
- Colonization, socio-political cultivation of land
  - Colonialism, the idea of socio-political cultivation of land and people
  - Civilizing mission, cultivation of people in the sense of cultural assimilation or forced assimilation
  - Developmentalism
- Microbiological culture, a method of multiplying microbial organisms
- Cultivation theory, George Gerbner's model of media effects
- A common translation for several terms originating in Chinese and broader East Asian philosophy and literature, such as Qigong and Kung Fu practices (including martial arts), Self-cultivation, and certain supernatural tropes often featured in Xianxia fiction.
- As a proper noun
  - Cultivation, a video game by Jason Rohrer
  - Cultivation, a 2006 album by Gram Rabbit
  - Cultivate (store)

== See also ==
- Cult (disambiguation)
- Farming (disambiguation)
