= Tom Rob Smith =

English author, screenwriter, producer (born 1979)

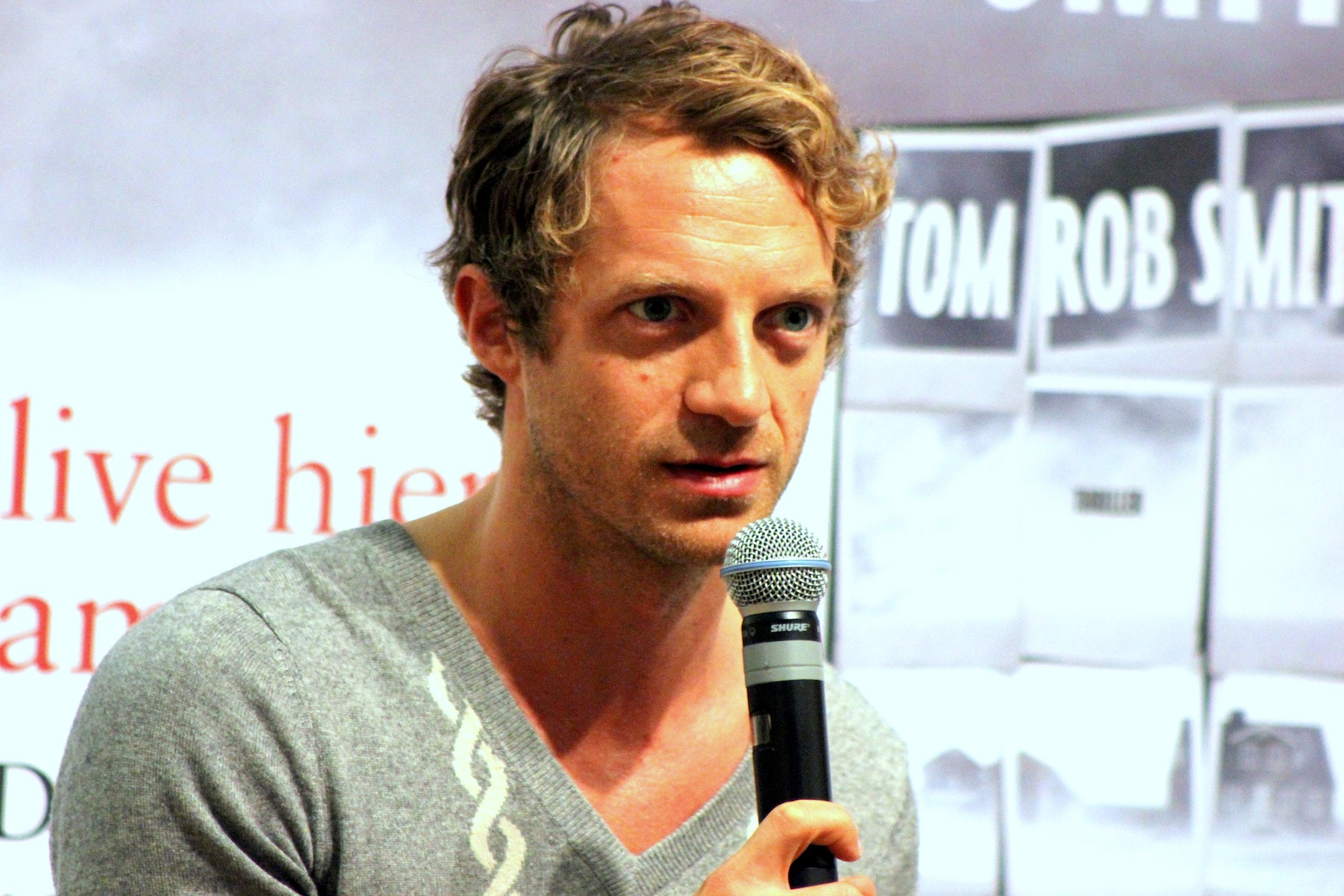
- Smith at 2013 Frankfurt Book Fair
- Born: February 19, 1979 (age 47); London, England
- Occupations: Author; screenwriter; producer
- Writing career
- Genres: Thriller, Mystery
- Website: tomrobsmith.com

Tom Rob Smith (born February 19, 1979) is an English author, screenwriter and producer. He is best known as the author of Child 44, a novel about the investigation of child murders during the Soviet Union. The book was adapted into a film of the same name, and Smith has written two sequels: The Secret Speech and Agent 6. His first standalone novel, The Farm, was published in 2014.

== Personal life and education ==
The son of Swedish mother Barbro and English father Ron, both antiques dealers, Smith was born and raised at Norbury, South London. He went to school at Dulwich College between the years of 1987 and 1997. Following his graduation from St John's College, Cambridge, in 2001, he received the Harper Wood Studentship for English Poetry and Literature and continued his Creative Writing studies for a year at the University of Pavia, in Italy. He was formerly the partner of Ben Stephenson.

== Career ==
After completing his studies, Smith worked as a writer and a script editor, including a stint with the BBC. Among his projects was story-lining Cambodia's first soap opera, set in Phnom Penh.

His first novel, Child 44, published in early 2008, was inspired by the true-life case of Andrei Chikatilo, who committed a series of child murders in Soviet Russia. It was awarded the 2008 Ian Fleming Steel Dagger for best thriller of the year by the Crime Writers' Association, named on the long list for the 2008 Man Booker Prize, and nominated for the 2008 Costa First Novel Award (former Whitbread). In July 2009, he won the Waverton Good Read Award for first novels and the Galaxy Book Award for Best Newcomer with Child 44. It has been translated into 36 languages and in January 2011, Richard Madeley and Judy Finnegan listed it in their Book Club "100 Books of the Decade". In 2007, Ridley Scott optioned the film rights.

Fox 2000 bought the project. A film based on the novel was announced in 2009, with Ridley Scott originally attached as both director and producer. The 2015 film was produced by Scott and his longtime production collaborator Michael Costigan, via Scott Free Productions, and directed by Daniel Espinosa. Child 44 stars Gary Oldman, Tom Hardy, Noomi Rapace, Charles Dance, and Joel Kinnaman.

Smith's sequel to Child 44, The Secret Speech, was published in April 2009, and the final novel in the trilogy, Agent 6, was published in July 2011. Smith's fourth book, a standalone novel entitled The Farm, was published in February 2014.

Smith also wrote a drama television series, London Spy, which was first broadcast on BBC Two in November 2015.

Smith was selected as executive producer and writer for season 2 of American Crime Story, an FX true crime anthology series. It is titled The Assassination of Gianni Versace and explores the murder of designer Gianni Versace by serial killer Andrew Cunanan.

== Bibliography ==
=== Child 44 Trilogy ===
- Child 44 (2008). ISBN 978-1847371263
- The Secret Speech (2009). ISBN 978-1847371287
- Agent 6 (2011). ISBN 978-1847375674

=== Other ===
- The Farm (2014). ISBN 978-1847375698
- Cold People (2023). ISBN 978-1471133107
- Twenty Years Together (2026). ISBN 978-1471133145

== Filmography ==
Production	Episodes	Broadcaster
Doctors	"Today's the Day" (2003); "Gap Year" (2004)	BBC One
Dream Team	6 episodes (2005)	Sky One
London Spy	Series creator (2015)	BBC Two
The Assassination of Gianni Versace: American Crime Story	Series creator (2018)	FX
MotherFatherSon	Series creator (2019)	BBC Two
Class of '09	Series creator (2023)	FX on Hulu
