= Child 44 =

2008 thriller novel by Tom Rob Smith

- First edition
- Author: Tom Rob Smith
- Language: English
- Genre: Thriller
- Publication date: 2008 (Simon & Schuster)
- Publication place: United Kingdom
- Media type: Print (hardback and paperback)
- Pages: 400
- ISBN: 1-84737-126-4
- Followed by: The Secret Speech

Child 44 is a 2008 thriller novel by British writer Tom Rob Smith. It is the first novel in a trilogy featuring former MGB Agent Leo Demidov, who investigates a series of gruesome child murders in Joseph Stalin's Soviet Union.

== Themes ==
This novel, the first in a trilogy, takes inspiration from the crimes of Andrei Chikatilo, also known as the Rostov Ripper, the Butcher of Rostov, and the Red Ripper. Chikatilo was convicted of and executed for committing 52 murders in the Soviet Union, though his crimes occurred after the Stalin era. In addition to highlighting the problem of Soviet-era crime in a state where "there is no crime", the novel explores the paranoia of the age, the education system, the secret police apparatus, the Holodomor, orphanages, homosexuality in the USSR and mental hospitals.

The second and third books in the trilogy, titled The Secret Speech (April 2009) and Agent 6 (July 2011), respectively, also feature the protagonist Leo Demidov and his wife, Raisa.

== Reception ==
The New York Times called Child 44 a "tightly woven", "ingeniously plotted", "high-voltage story". The Sunday Telegraph praised it as a "memorable debut": "the atmosphere of paranoia and paralysing fear is brilliantly portrayed and unremittingly grim". Kirkus Reviews gave it a starred review, calling it "smashing"; "nerve-wracking pace and atmosphere camouflage wild coincidences". In The Observer, Peter Guttridge praised it as a "thrilling, intense piece of fiction".

Another New York Times reviewer called it "an adequate police procedural", and a review of the paperback edition in The Guardian said "the story is exciting, but the characters and dialogue are underdeveloped, and the prose studiously bland". This view was mirrored by a further review for The Guardian, by Angus Macqueen, who stated that while "this is a compelling detective story", "the desire for the plot to encompass every element of Soviet history eventually overrides any sense of artistic seriousness". Macqueen did state that the novel "remains a real achievement" and that it delivers "all the pleasures of a brilliant airport read".

== Awards ==
Child 44 has been translated into 36 languages. Additionally, it was nominated for 17 international awards and won seven.

In 2008, it was named on the longlist for the Man Booker Prize, nominated for the 2008 Costa First Novel Award, and received the CWA Ian Fleming Steel Dagger for best thriller of the year from the Crime Writers' Association. It was also shortlisted for the Desmond Elliott Prize for a first novel in 2008.

Smith was awarded the 2009 British Book Award for Newcomer, and Child 44 nominated for Crime Thriller of the Year.

In July 2009, he won the Waverton Good Read Award for first novel.

In January 2011, Richard Madeley and Judy Finnegan listed it in their Book Club 100 Books of the Decade.

== Film adaptation ==
In April 2007, it was announced that Ridley Scott had optioned the film rights. Fox 2000 bought the project, and in 2009, a film based on the novel was announced, with Scott originally attached as director and producer. Ultimately the film Child 44 (2015) was produced by Scott and Michael Costigan and directed by Daniel Espinosa. Child 44 stars Gary Oldman, Tom Hardy, Noomi Rapace, Charles Dance, and Joel Kinnaman.

== See also ==
- Gorky Park, a novel featuring the fictional detective Arkady Renko
