= The Secret Speech (novel) =

2009 novel by Tom Rob Smith

- First edition
- Author: Tom Rob Smith
- Language: English
- Genre: Thriller
- Publisher: Grand Central Publishing
- Publication date: 2009
- Publication place: United Kingdom
- Media type: Print (hardcover and paperback)
- Pages: 440
- ISBN: 0446402419
- Followed by: Agent 6

The Secret Speech is the second novel in a trilogy by British author Tom Rob Smith; it was first published by Grand Central Publishing in April 2009. The book features a repeat appearance of Leo Stepanovich Demidov, the protagonist of Smith's first book, Child 44 (2008). The Secret Speech is a further exploration of the Soviet Union Joseph Stalin created. The third novel in the trilogy, Agent 6, was published in 2011.

== Overview ==
=== Themes ===
The title refers to Soviet leader Nikita Khrushchev's 1956 address admitting Stalin's crimes. The book continues to develop the theme begun in Smith's first work. Leo's nationalism evolves as a microcosm of the country's social revolution. The book serves as a good illustration of the internal conflict the citizens felt under Stalin's reign.

Over the course of the two books, Smith develops his protagonist's understanding of family. In this second offering, the daughters of slain farmers from the first book return. A conflict develops helping to illustrate to the reader the issues introduced during the release of political prisoners after Stalin's death.

=== Synopsis ===
In the three years since the events of Child 44, Leo Demidov has established the Homicide Division within the KGB, which he uses to investigate what he calls "real crimes". While investigating the apparent murder of Suren Moskvin, a Ministry for State Security (MGB) officer, Leo is approached by Nikolai, his former superior officer in the MGB. Nikolai claims that he is being harassed by someone who sends him photographs of people he arrested. Leo, however, is distracted by troubles with his adoptive daughter Zoya—who does not accept him as her father—and writes Nikolai's claims off as the ramblings of a drunkard. When Khrushchev's speech, On the Cult of Personality and Its Consequences in which Khrushchev denounces the tactics used by Josef Stalin, is distributed for the population to read, Nikolai is consumed by his guilt and kills both himself and his family. When Leo realises that Moskvin also committed suicide after being sent photographs of people he arrested, he deduces that someone is seeking retribution against the government and its agents for their crimes and that he is a target.

The person responsible is Anisya, the wife of a priest whom Leo arrested after infiltrating the Church seven years previously. In the time since being sent to a Gulag (forced-labour camp) Anisya has risen through the ranks of the vory v zakone to the point where she commands an entire band of criminals. Now known as Fraera, she holds a particular grudge against Leo and plans to make him suffer. She kidnaps Zoya and forces Leo to free her husband, Lazar. With the help of Frol Panin, a senior KGB agent, Leo and his friend Timur Nesterov travel to Kolyma 58—a notorious gulag in the Russian Far East—posing as a criminal and a guard with a plan to break Lazar out of prison and escort him back to Moscow. The journey proves difficult and Leo and Timur are separated; when Timur is forced to reveal himself as an agent of the government, he is murdered, whilst Lazar identifies Leo straight away and he is subjected to torture by the other prisoners as he tries to convince Lazar that Anisya sent him to free him. Leo convinces the half-mad commander of the camp to read Khrushchev's speech to the prisoners; the commander also confesses to several of his own crimes. This inspires the prisoners to revolt, overthrowing the guards and taking control of Kolyma 58. The prisoners hold a trial of the guards, executing the commander. Leo is also subjected to a trial, but is saved by Lazar when Lazar realises he is telling the truth about Anisya. Leo and Lazar escape the gulag while the prisoners try to negotiate with government forces in the area.

Fraera begins to turn Zoya against Leo. Having realised her intense dislike for her adoptive father, Fraera inducts her to the vory, where she begins to bond with Malysh, a pickpocket. When Leo and Lazar return to Moscow, Zoya stages her own death at Fraera's hands, and escapes with the vory as Fraera kills Lazar the moment she sees him. Distraught, Leo realises that Fraera's plan was supported by Frol Panin and Soviet hardliners in the Kremlin who believe that On the Cult of Personality and Its Consequences is an international embarrassment and its encouragement of discussion of Stalin's crimes among the population has weakened the government's authority. Panin uses Fraera's plans for revenge to convince the Kremlin to repeal parts of Khrushchev's speech, re-establishing their control. He does not trust her, and admits the scheme to Leo, adding that Zoya is still alive and living with the vory in Budapest where they are trying to trigger an uprising among the population, to be thwarted by the occupying Soviet forces, further legitimising the Kremlin's position. Panin plans to exploit Leo's rage and turn him into an assassin, killing Fraera and tying up loose ends.

Leo and his wife Raisa travel to Budapest where they find the city in the midst of a uprising orchestrated by Fraera. Fraera makes no attempt to hide herself from Leo, luring him in and holding him captive while she undermines the Soviet rule in Hungary and keeps turning Zoya against him. Zoya and Malysh have become disillusioned with the concept of a revolution and plan to run away together. Fraera lets them go, confiding in Leo that he now has a family that will never love him. As they escape across the rooftops, Fraera uses a camera to photograph the devastation in the city, smuggling the photographs out of the country with refugees and dissidents to show the world the true nature of Soviet rule. She is killed in an airstrike before the most damning evidence can be exposed.

As they try to escape the city, Malysh becomes separated from Leo, Raisa and Zoya. Leo is prepared to leave him behind before realising that Malysh plans to secure safe passage out by destroying a tank. He succeeds, but is mortally injured in the process. Zoya refuses to leave him behind, and Leo carries Malysh's body away from the fighting so that he might have a proper burial. This act convinces Zoya that her adoptive father is not evil and capable of redeeming himself. It is not enough for her to start trusting him, but she is willing to live with him. The story ends with Leo leaving the KGB to become a baker, while Zoya is reunited with her sister in Moscow.

== Reception ==
USA Today praised it as a "breathlessly paced", "explosive thriller", going "even further than [the] acclaimed Child 44 in capturing the mood of the Cold War-era Soviet Union". Kirkus reviews gave it a starred review, calling it a "superb thriller, full of pitch-perfect atmosphere". Author Charlie Higson, writing for The Guardian, called it "a great piledriver of a read".

The novel also received some negative reviews. Michael Harris, for the LA Times, stated that while "Smith remains a fiendishly intricate plotter", he found that "this is a routine thriller crammed so full of reversals that the life is squeezed out of the characters". Harris goes on to note that "even the editing is slipshod", stating that "phrases such as "[l]owering his feet, the floor seemed to move" nag like the throbbing of a toothache"; he does, however, recognise that "this is a novel that really, really wants to be a movie".
