= University of Virginia shooting =

University of Virginia shooting may refer to:

- John A. G. Davis, a University of Virginia School of Law professor who was fatally shot on the UVA campus in 1840
- 2022 University of Virginia shooting, which occurred in November 2022
