= Farm Lake =

Lake in the state of Minnesota, United States

- Location within Minnesota
- Location: Lake County, Minnesota
- Coordinates: 47°53′48″N 91°43′32″W
- Type: lake

Farm Lake is a lake in Lake County, in the U.S. state of Minnesota.

Farm Lake was named from the fact the Ojibwe Indians planted their crops there.

== See also ==
- List of lakes in Minnesota
