= Lewis Farm =

Historic house in Virginia, United States

- U.S. National Register of Historic Places
- Virginia Landmarks Register
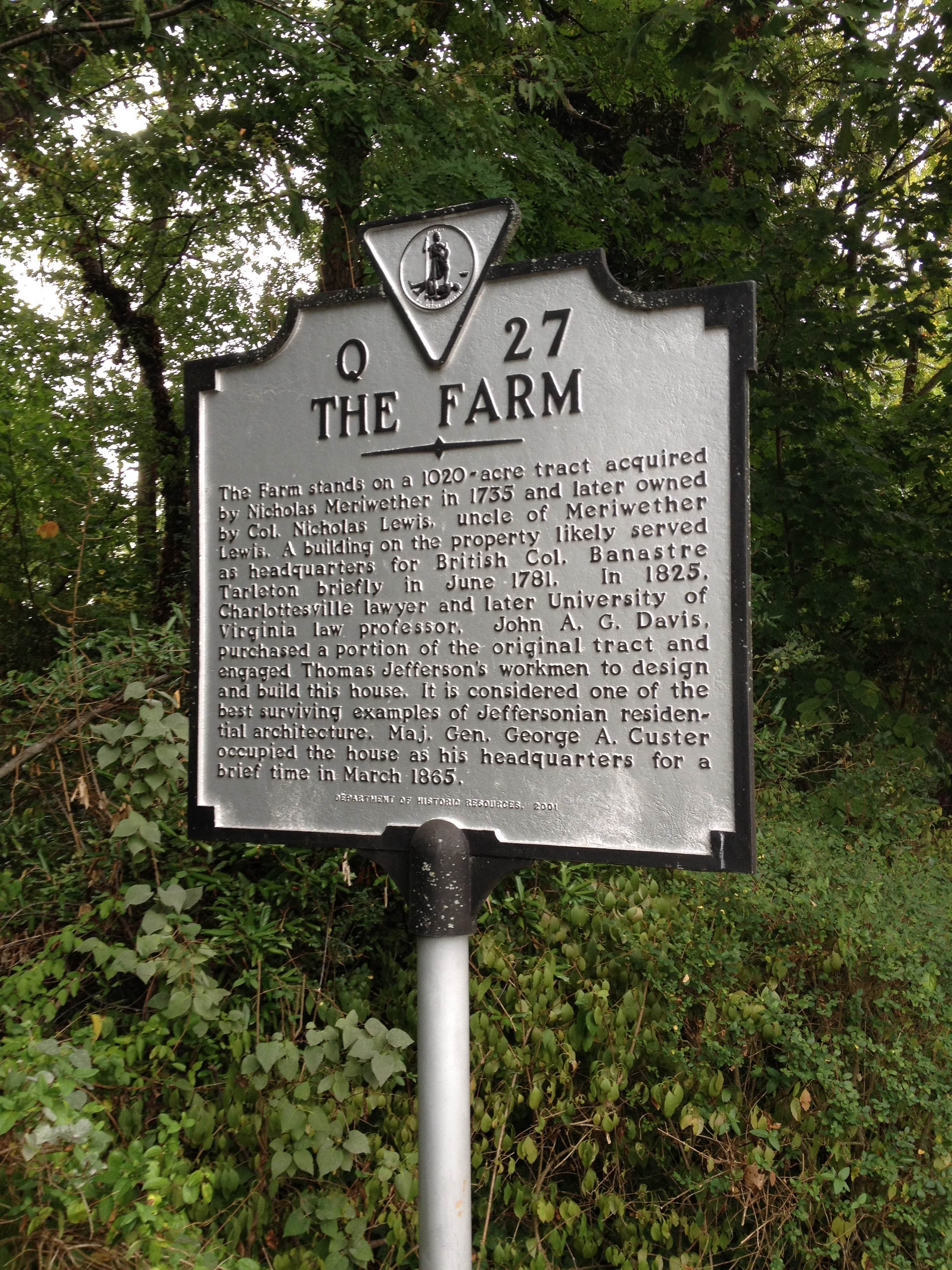

- Location within Virginia Location within the United States
- Location: 1201 Jefferson St., Charlottesville, Virginia
- Coordinates: 38°1′44″N 78°28′8″W
- Area: 1 acre (0.40 ha)
- Built: 1826
- Built by: Phillips, William B.; Crawford, Malcolm F.
- Architectural style: Jeffersonian
- MPS: Charlottesville MRA
- NRHP reference No.: 82001807
- VLR No.: 104-0002

Significant dates
- Added to NRHP: October 21, 1982
- Designated VLR: October 20, 1981, March 20, 1996

The historic home listed as Lewis Farm, also known as The Farm and John A. G. Davis Farm, is located at Charlottesville, Virginia. It was built in 1826, and is a two-story brick dwelling with a low hipped roof and two large chimneys. On the front facade is a Tuscan order portico with a terrace above. The house was built by individuals who worked with Thomas Jefferson on building the University of Virginia. Its builder, John A. G. Davis, was law professor at the University of Virginia and was shot and killed outside Pavilion X by a student in 1840. During the American Civil War, Brigadier General George Armstrong Custer set up temporary headquarters at the house where he remained for three days.

It was listed on the National Register of Historic Places in 1982.

== History ==
In 1735, Nicholas Meriwether obtained patents from King George III to approximately 19,000 acres in Albemarle County east of Charlottesville. One parcel of 1020 acres was located west of the Rivanna River, the area which now is the Locust Grove and Belmont neighborhoods. It became known as "The Farm" because it was the one cleared area in a virgin forest.

A main house and out buildings were built at "The Farm" on the hill facing the river to the east. The house burned after a couple of decades. Nicholas Lewis, grandson of Meriwether, inherited the property in 1762 and built another main house facing the river around 1770. Nicholas Lewis (1734-1808) was an Albemarle County landowner and friend of Thomas Jefferson. Lewis was also an officer in the American Revolution, a County magistrate, Surveyor, and Sheriff. After the death of Nicholas Meriwether, his grandfather, in 1744, Lewis inherited The Farm, 1,020 acres on both sides of the Rivanna River east of Charlottesville. The estate was the headquarters of British Lt. Col. Banastre Tarleton, who occupied Charlottesville for a day in 1781 to pursue Jefferson and the rest of the Virginian legislators.

It was described as a place of beauty surrounded by a garden of roses, shrubs and fine fruit. It could have been built on or near the foundations for the first house. A listing in The Mutual Assurance Society of Virginia records from 1805 may describe the house. It was a wooden dwelling two stories high, 48 feet long and 22 feet wide. There is an active spring down the hill a couple of hundred yards to the south. All that remains is the kitchen or cook's house. It now is in the middle of a middle class housing subdivision facing Twelfth Street. It is still surrounded by mature hardwood trees and retains its view of Monticello. Nicholas Lewis was buried on his property in a cemetery on a hilltop overlooking the river where his gravestone says January 19, 1734 to December 8, 1808.
