= Farmer (disambiguation) =

A farmer is a person who engages in agriculture.

Farmer or farmers may also refer to:

== Places ==
=== United States ===
- Farmer, Missouri, an unincorporated community
- Farmer, North Carolina, an unincorporated community
- Farmer, Ohio, an unincorporated community
- Farmer City, Illinois
- Farmer City, Kansas, a ghost town
- Farmer, South Dakota, a town
- Farmer Township, Defiance County, Ohio
- Farmer Township, Rice County, Kansas
- Farmers, Indiana, an unincorporated community
- Farmers, Kentucky, a census-designated place
- Farmers, Ohio, an unincorporated community
- Farmers Township, Fulton County, Illinois

=== Elsewhere ===
- Farmer Glacier, Oates Land, Antarctica
- Farmer Island, Queensland, Australia

== People ==
- Farmer (surname), a list of people bearing the surname Farmer
- George Bennett (cricketer, born 1829) (1829–1886), English cricketer
- Farmer Brooks (1957–2022), ring name of Canadian retired midget professional wrestler Clifford Fraser
- Farmer Burns (baseball) (1876–?), American baseball pitcher
- Martin Burns (1861–1937), professional wrestler
- Farmer Kelly (1889–1961), American college football player (1911–1914)
- Langford Peel (1831–1867), English gunman in the American Old West
- Farmer Ray (1886–1963), American Major League Baseball pitcher in the 1910 season
- Farmer Steelman (1875–1944), American Major League Baseball catcher
- Farmer Vaughn (1864–1914), American Major League Baseball player
- Farmer Weaver (1865–1943), American Major League Baseball player

== Arts, entertainment, and media ==
=== Music ===
- "Farmers", a song by LL Cool J from his 2000 album G.O.A.T.
- The Farmer (opera), a 1787 English comic opera
- The Farmer (song), the debut single of Thin Lizzy

=== Other uses in arts, entertainment, and media ===
- The Farmer (film), a 1977 American crime action film
- The Farmer, a South Australian publication, issued from 1933 to 1947, see Yorke Peninsula Country Times
- "The Farmer", a season 3 episode of the television series Haven
- The Farmer, a fictional character from the animated series Shaun the Sheep

== Businesses ==
- Farmer (revenue leasing), pays a lease to a governing power for the right to collect taxes, customs, excise, or other duties. A common practice in the past, but not any more
- Farmers Insurance Group, an insurance carrier in the United States
- Farmers' Mutual Group, former name of FMG Insurance, a mutual insurance company in New Zealand
- Farmers State Bank (disambiguation), various banks in the United States
- Farmers (department store), a department store chain in New Zealand
- Farmer & Company, a defunct department store in Australia

== Military ==
- Mikoyan-Gurevich MiG-19 (NATO reporting name: Farmer), a Soviet fighter aircraft
- Shenyang J-6 (NATO reporting name: Farmer), the Chinese variant of the MiG-19

== Political parties ==
- Farmer (party), a non-existent party occasionally used as a ticket by disgruntled members of the United Farmers in the 1925 and 1930 Canadian federal elections
- Farmers' Party (disambiguation)

== Other uses ==
- Farmer, the defendant in the landmark US Supreme Court case Pollock v. Farmers' Loan & Trust Co.
- Farmer baronets, an extinct title in the Baronetage of Great Britain
- Farmers Classic, the name of the now defunct Los Angeles Open tournament from 2010 to 2012
- Russian Gyroplanes Gyros-1 Farmer, a Russian gyroplane design

== See also ==
- FAMA, Hong Kong hip hop group
- Farm (disambiguation)
