= Farmer Glacier =

Glacier in Antarctica

Farmer Glacier (81°47′S 159°48′E) is a glacier flowing north west into Starshot Glacier, and located between Mount McKerrow to the north and Thompson Mountain to the south, at the southern end of the Surveyors Range in Antarctica. It was named in honor of D. W. Farmer, a member of the 1960 Cape Hallett winter-over team, working as a technician on the geomagnetic project.
