= Pharma (album) =

- Cover art by Keith Rankin

Studio album / Remix album by Nmesh
- Released: August 4, 2017
- Genres: Vaporwave; psychedelic; plunderphonics
- Label: Orange Milk
- Producer: Alex Koenig

Singles from Pharma
- 1. "NΞ1✪NΞ1" Released: June 14, 2017; 2. "White Lodge Simulation (Odd Nosdam Remix)" Released: July 17, 2017; 3. "Mall Full Of Drugs" Released: July 31, 2017

Nmesh chronology
[bumps] (2016)	Pharma (2017)

Pharma is a double album by American vaporwave producer Alex Koenig, also known as Nmesh. It was released August 4, 2017 on Orange Milk Records. It follows the same vaporwave style as other Nmesh albums like Nu.wav Hallucinations (2013) and Dream Sequins (2014).

== Composition ==
Like other Nmesh records such as Nu.wav Hallucinations (2013) and Dream Sequins (2014), Pharma is an album that is, as Bandcamp Daily stated, "a dazzling confluence of media: pitch-shifted barely-registered cultural phenomena turned into hallucinatory sequences, advertising trash enlivened through eccojam manipulation, audio warping that blurs eras like a pre-set Photoshop filter." Where Pharma differs from other Nmesh albums is its more "off-kilter" and "slap-happy" tone (as described by Koenig) and its source material, which includes samples of media from a "collective memory" instead of the content Koenig experienced in his childhood.

== Style ==
The media Pharma samples includes the show The Baby-Sitters Club, a Soul II Soul song, the Yello song "Oh Yeah," music from the game Pac-Man (1980), the Sam Raimi cult film Army Of Darkness (1992), the 1951 Disney animated film Alice in Wonderland and VHS tapes the producer's wife recorded as a kid on the songs "Vault Maintenance 700 CMC" and "cut scene 5230-4968 albatross 0923-1874." Pharma also goes through genres such as big beat, swing, UK garage, lounge, exotica, soul, hip-hop, ambient, and drum 'n' bass. Writer A. Noah Harrison labeled Pharma as a psychedelic record rather than a vaporwave album because, despite concerning nostalgic memories common in vaporwave, they're "indelibly glossed over, redacted, and memed into a higher dimension."

== Reception ==
Professional ratings
Review scores
Source	Rating
Exclaim!	8/10
Resident Advisor	4/5
Tiny Mix Tapes	4.5/5 marks

Resident Advisor praised Pharma as "an album so vast and confusing that, whenever you lose your bearings, you'll usually find something new to enjoy each time." Fact magazine critic Miles Bowe called it the best record in Nmesh's discography, reasoning that "There’s too much to keep up with, but overstimulation is Nmesh’s comfort zone and it’ll be yours too once acclimated to Pharma's colorful chaos." In describing the charm of the LP, Tiny Mix Tapes summarized that it "begins steeped in mystery, in government secrets, in phantasms, in hard-drives inside vaults immersed inside administrative centers, and ends as a node to the body." The publication later placed it at number 47 on their list of the best releases of 2017, claiming that it "went beyond simulation, toward the tangible archaeological rescue of base cultural artifacts, offering a digital rendering of the remnants of human primitivity that felt especially appropriate in this historical moment." Gorilla vs. Bear ranked the album number 58 on their list of the best albums of 2017, while PopMatters put it at number ten on their year-end list regarding experimental and avant-garde albums.

== Track listing ==
Derived from the official Orange Milk Records Bandcamp page.

Tape A: Original tracks
No.	Title	Length
1.	"Understand"	0:14
2.	"NΞ1✪NΞ1"	3:37
3.	"Fall Any Vegetable"	2:01
4.	"Rangdang Slapjab"	1:25
5.	"BΛSS///COP™"	3:40
6.	"Vault Maintenance 700 CMC (Black Swan Dub)"	2:10
7.	"cut scene 5230-4968 albatross 0923-1874"	0:20
8.	"White Lodge Simulation"	8:24
9.	"High Speed Adjustable Broiler"	1:12
10.	"Tiny Classified Ads"	1:52
11.	"Acid Baby (narr. Tony Bamanaboni)"	4:12
12.	"PBS Ancillary Rack Room"	2:12
13.	"Cocktails In Space"	3:21
14.	"Pants-A-Thon @ SQUAREBASE"	1:25
15.	"Mall Full Of Drugs"	9:13
16.	"Phase 1 Lvl Snap Chill"	0:30
17.	"Everyone Will Flake Out"	0:55
18.	"The Program (You Are Stars)"	1:36
19.	"Workalude"	1:26
20.	"/////LD-99/////"	3:57
21.	"Weed Jesus"	4:24
22.	"Twilight Meridian"	2:21
23.	"Milk Channel"	3:05
24.	"NΞW JΛCK CITY"	1:27
25.	"Hepatic Portal"	5:47
26.	"Left Alone In A Blue Room"	1:40
Total length:		72:22

Tape B: Remixes
No.	Title	Length
1.	"White Lodge Simulation" (Odd Nosdam Remix)	4:52
2.	"Fall Any Vegetable" (食品まつり a.k.a. foodman remix)	3:43
3.	"NΞ1✪NΞ1" (Jacob 2-2 RMX)	3:50
4.	"Mall Full Of Drugs" (Traxman's high as hell remixx)	4:31
5.	"Weed Jesus" (Giganta Remix)	3:39
6.	"Mall Full Of Drugs" (Rebuilt by Humanoid)	5:20
7.	"Twilight Meridian" (GOLDEN LIVING ROOM Remix)	3:22
8.	"Tiny Classified Ads" (FIRE-TOOLZ Effexor Withdrawal Remix)	9:43
9.	"White Lodge Simulation" (VAPERROR Remix)	2:37
10.	"PBS Ancillary Rack Room" (Diamondstein Remix)	7:37
11.	"Twilight Meridian" (Jade Statues Remix)	4:20
12.	"Hepatic Portal" (death dynamic shroud.wmv's NUWRLD Version)	4:15
13.	"Mall Full Of Drugs" (HKE Remix)	3:42
14.	"Acid Baby" (Hyphyskazerbox's Trippy Mane Mix)	4:11
15.	"/////LD-99/////" (djwwww Remix)	4:31
16.	"Left Alone In A Blue Room" (Obama420 SCHALk ReM1XXX)	4:44
Total length:		74:57

== Release history ==
Region	Date	Format(s)	Label
Worldwide	August 4, 2017	Cassette; digital download	Orange Milk

== See also ==
- 2017 in music
- Sound collage
