= Academic Model Providing Access to Healthcare =

- Founded: 2001
- Founder: Joseph Mamlin
- Region served: Western Kenya
- Website: ampathkenya.org

The Academic Model Providing Access to Healthcare (AMPATH) is an academic medical partnership between North American academic health centers led by the Indiana University School of Medicine in Indianapolis, Indiana and the Moi University School of Medicine, centered in Eldoret, Kenya. It is the first food-and-drug treatment model to be established in Africa. The program seeks to provide comprehensive HIV care services through its three-way mission: care, research, and training; It currently serves 3.5 million people, with over 60 urban and rural clinics in Western Kenya.

== History ==
AMPATH began in 1989 as an educational medical partnership between Indiana University Medical School (IUMS) and Moi University to collaboratively improve health services, partake in health research and develop leaders in health care in the United States and Kenya. IU assisted in founding Moi University School of Medicine in 1990, Kenya's second medical school, and also consequently helped set up the healthcare system in western Kenya.

In 2001, in the face of the deadliest pandemic in human history, the partners joined forces to create one of Africa's largest, most comprehensive and effective HIV/AIDS control systems. The nine members are Indiana University School of Medicine, Brown University School of Medicine, Duke University Medical Center, Lehigh Valley Hospital–Cedar Crest, Providence Portland Medical Center, Purdue University, University of Utah School of Medicine, University of Texas at Austin Dell Medical School, and University of Toronto Faculty of Medicine. Today, in partnership with the Kenyan Ministry of Health and the United States government, AMPATH is expanding from an HIV focus to address the critical needs for primary health care, chronic disease care, and specialty care.

== Mission ==
In AMPATH's definition of "healthcare," the focus is on the patient, not the disease. If a patient is hungry, or without a job, or is the victim of discrimination or abuse, AMPATH will respond, a commitment that leads inexorably toward holistic care. Therefore, AMPATH not only treats over 140,000 HIV-positive persons at over 60 urban and rural clinic sites throughout western Kenya. It also partners with the UN World Food Programme to feed 31,000 HIV-affected persons daily, provide school fees, nutrition, and other assistance over 20,000 children left orphaned or vulnerable due to HIV/AIDS, and has enrolled 10,000-plus patients in income security programs, including agricultural extension services, micro-finance and small business initiatives. The program also conducts prevention and early treatment programs that demonstrate a community-based effort that can virtually halt the spread of HIV/AIDS.

Local leadership is the key to sustainability of any global health effort, so all of AMPATH's programming is led and implemented by Kenyans. Sustainability is a core component of AMPATH at every level, as evidenced by the use of an advanced electronic medical record system to enable cost savings through task-shifting in clinical care (over 100 sites globally now host the AMPATH-originated Open Medical Records System, OpenMRS), overall program integration with the Kenyan government through a new partnership with the Ministry of Health, and a focus on developing income security for patients who will one day be able to pay for the care they receive.

Nearly 1,000 Kenyan and American medical students have been trained through this program, and AMPATH has received over $59 million in funding from large groups like NIH and the Gates Foundation.

== Programs ==
=== Agriculture & Nutrition ===
For many patients, anti-retroviral drugs alone are not enough for full recovery, because of malnutrition and food insecurity. The partnership made the effort to ensure the full health and prosperity of its patients by setting up food support, agricultural, and nutrition programs. In conjunction with the World Food Programme (WFP) and United States Agency for International Development, high-production farms were established in order to advance local self-sustainability in addition to mere food distribution. Additionally there is a nutrition program offering nutrition assessment, education and counseling.

A comprehensive electronic system designed by the School of Industrial Engineering at Purdue University called Nutritional Information System (NIS) is used to record, organize, and assist effective food distribution.

==== Food Distribution ====
The WFP/AMPATH partnership began in 2005, and currently has distributed more than 250 metric tons of food, feeding over 30,000 people and 7,000 households per day. Each patient receives 6 kg of maize, 1.8 kg of pulses, and 0.45 kg of vegetable oil per month. The partnership feeds all of its nutrition-deficient patients (including those with tuberculosis and cancer), orphans, and HIV+ prisoners (who meet certain eligibility criteria of having a BMI less than 18.5)

Dry foods like maize, beans, lentils, palm oil, RUTF, and fortified corn-soy blend are provided by the WFP and USAID, and fresh vegetables are provided by production and training farms.

=== Production Farms ===
There are 4 high-production farms and 2 teaching model farms, which produce approximately 6 tons of vegetables per week, with capacity to produce 11 tons/week. With a continuous source of water, these farms are able to produce a reliable, year-round supply of fresh vegetables.

In addition to actual food production, the partnership stresses sustainability, and teaches modern farming techniques to its recovering patients so they are able to grow their own food. A new "client feed client" model of farming was introduced, in which clients given monthly food prescriptions simply walk to the nearest AMPATH farm and collect their prescribed amount at their convenience. This food is produced by other clients, giving them income.

=== Children's Services ===
The Orphans and Vulnerable Children (OVC) program provides access to education, protection, shelter, food security, psychosocial support, medical care and economic security to any orphans or vulnerable children within the AMPATH catchment area. There are over 20,000 children registered in this program, in seven main clinic areas: Eldoret, Burnt Forest, Iten, Kabarnet, Mosoriot, Port Victoria and Turbo.

=== Clinical & Public Health Services ===
A number of partnerships to improve the clinical and public health services in Kenya with members of the AMPATH consortium are focused on different areas of health, including but not limited to: dentistry, emergency medicine, orthopedics, surgery, anesthesia, radiology, medicine, family medicine, and palliative care. Many of these programs are focused on training, but also centers such as the Drug Information Centre (DIC).

=== Communicable Diseases ===
==== Household Counseling and Testing Program (HCT) ====
HCT workers enroll every individual in each community and register them in a database. In addition to testing for HIV, they also screen for tuberculosis and other chronic diseases such as diabetes and hypertension, treat children for intestinal worms, deliver treated bed nets to prevent malaria, and provide nutritional counseling. It costs $1.50 per person to provide all of the services that are covered with HCT, except for the cost of the treated bed nets.

==== Maji Safi (Safe Water) ====
The Maji Safi program aims to make safe, clean water accessible for all, in both the community and the household. It supplies water treatment packets that are designed to kill cholera and typhoid fever bacteria. They are sold through the local shops (dukas). The community water wells and a hand washing curriculum are also being developed. The program hopes to ultimately expand the program to provide safe and available water for the 2 million living in the AMPATH catchment area.

=== Family Preservation Initiative ===
The purpose of the Family Preservation Initiative (FPI) is to provide financial support for its clients, whilst avoiding financial dependence. FPI offers income-generating programs that offer self-sustainable opportunities for its patients: capacity building services including business and agricultural training courses, business and agricultural consultancy, and access to loans and savings. Also FPI develops a number of different enterprises, including Valley Orchards, Green World Nursery, Cool Stream Restaurant, and Imani Workshops.

==== Imani Workshops ====
Imani Workshops is a handmade crafts business that reinvests 100% of its income to benefit its employees, all of whom are HIV+ patients in Western Kenya. During and even after recovery, many patients struggle with financial security and independence, made even more difficult by the social stigma associated with HIV+ individuals. Formed in January 2005, Imani Workshops is a part of The Family Preservation Initiative, aiming to give their patients, focusing on women, income-generating opportunities in order to be self-sustainable and support their families. Imani Workshops creates workshops with jobs for these women to produce high quality handmade jewelry, accessories, clothing, bags, and other accessories.

=== Maternal & Child Health ===
AMPATH has partnered with the Kenyan government to provide improved access to primary healthcare to all children and extensive medical care to over 22,000 HIV-infected or exposed children. The program targets those children who have been infected or exposed to HIV from HIV-infected mothers, and offers HIV testing, antiretroviral medicine, preventive medicine, nutritional support, disclosure counseling, and adolescent support groups in 55 different locations in Western Kenya.

==== Reproductive Health ====
Formed in 2007 between the University of Toronto, Duke University, and Indiana University, the Reproductive Health program aims to improve reproductive health in Western Kenya through the ALARM international program and the Cervical Cancer Screening and Treatment Program.

The ALARM (Advances in Labor and Risk Management) international training program is a five-day training program mainly targeting health professionals designed by the Society of Obstetricians and Gynaecologists of Canada. The main purpose of the program is to help reduce death and injury caused by pregnancy, childbirth and unsafe abortion. The program emphasizes discussion of sexual and reproductive rights as well as hands-on practice of clinical procedures.

The Cervical Cancer Screening Program (CCSP) began in 2008, aiming to ultimately reduce the amount of cervical cancer in Kenya. Since then, over 1,100 women have been screened, 80 have gone through curative treatment for cervical dysplasia (LEEP), and 19 have had hysterectomies performed on them.

==== Riley Mother and Baby Hospital ====
Riley Mother and Baby Hospital (RMBHK), the vision of Dr. James A. Lemons of Indiana University School of Medicine, opened April 29, 2009 in Eldoret, Kenya, and is part of the Moi Teaching and Referral Hospital. RMBHK is focused on providing services for pregnant mothers as well as their babies through education, training and research. The hospital accommodates 12,000 deliveries a year, serves as the teaching hospital for nearly one-third of all doctors in Kenya, and includes the first and only neonatal intensive care unit in East Africa.

=== Primary Care & Chronic Diseases ===
The partnership will deliver comprehensive primary healthcare to a target population of 500,000 people through 5 innovation sites, emphasizing essential health care at the community, dispensary, and health centres.

Its HIV clinics are transitioning into more comprehensive clinics that address many other chronic diseases, including a diabetes program, an oncology center, and cardiovascular and pulmonary care.

=== Research ===
The AMPATH Research Network was founded in 1998, overseeing research projects aimed to improve the health and health care systems of Kenya. Over 170 publications have resulted from these collaborations between more than the 19 universities have taken part in the research program, which include Brown, Yale, Columbia, UCSF, Duke, Purdue, Stanford, NYU, and University of Toronto. The program has received over $67 million in direct costs in research grants

=== Social Health ===
There is also involvement in a number of projects geared towards social work, with 35 social workers serving over 100,000 people. The B-Fine Women's Project (Burnt Forest Initiative for the Empowerment of Women) is designed to reduce HIV risk of commercial sex workers in the Burnt Forest area, offering diagnosis and treatment of sexually transmitted infections (STI), HIV testing, counseling, cervical cancer screening, and gynecology care.

In addition to the B-Fine Women's Project, there are mental health services and a women's shelter (Amani Women's Shelter).

== Current Work ==
There are currently over 60 urban and rural clinic sites. This map shows some of the various sites across the country and the details of the involvement and work.

The work in relieving its HIV+ patients continues, but the partnership has also become research-oriented in the past years, with its main strides in cancer research. The program is also making full use of modern-day technology, using Google’s open source mobile operating system (Android) as a data collection tool in its Home-based Counseling and Testing (HCT).
