= State farm =

State Farm is an American insurance company.

State Farm may also refer to:

== Agriculture ==
- Sovkhoz, or Soviet farm, a state-owned farm in the Soviet Union and some post-Soviet states
- State Agricultural Farm, a form of collective farming in People's Republic of Poland
- Volkseigenes Gut, state-owned farm in East Germany
- Prison farm, a correctional facility where convicts work on a farm

== Sports facilities ==
- State Farm Arena, in Atlanta, Georgia, U.S.
- Payne Arena, formerly State Farm Arena and State Farm Hidalgo Arena, in Hidalgo, Texas, U.S.
- State Farm Center, in Champaign, Illinois, U.S.
- State Farm Stadium, in Glendale, Arizona, U.S.
