= Pharming =

Form of cyberattack

Pharming is a cyberattack intended to redirect a website's traffic to another, fake site by installing a malicious program on the victim's computer in order to gain access to it. Pharming can be conducted either by changing the hosts file on a victim's computer or by exploitation of a vulnerability in DNS server software. DNS servers are computers responsible for resolving Internet domain names into their IP addresses. Compromised DNS servers are sometimes referred to as "poisoned". Pharming requires compromising a target computer, or cache poisoning.

The term "pharming" is a neologism based on the words "farming" and "phishing". Phishing is a type of social-engineering attack to obtain access credentials, such as user names and passwords. In recent years, both pharming and phishing have been used to gain information for online identity theft. Pharming has become of major concern to businesses hosting ecommerce and online banking websites. Sophisticated measures known as anti-pharming are required to protect against this serious threat. Antivirus software and spyware removal software cannot protect against pharming.

== Vulnerabilities ==
While malicious domain-name resolution can result from compromises in the large numbers of trusted nodes from a name lookup, the most vulnerable points of compromise are near the leaves of the Internet. For instance, incorrect entries in a desktop computer's hosts file, which circumvents name lookup with its own local name to IP address mapping, is a popular target for malware. Once rewritten, a legitimate request for a sensitive website can direct the user to a fraudulent copy.Personal computers such as desktops and laptops are often better targets for pharming because they receive poorer administration than most Internet servers.

More worrisome than host-file attacks is the compromise of a local network router. Since most routers specify a trusted DNS to clients as they join the network, misinformation here will spoil lookups for the entire LAN. Unlike host-file rewrites, local-router compromise is difficult to detect. Routers can pass bad DNS information in two ways: misconfiguration of existing settings or wholesale rewrite of embedded software (aka firmware). Many routers allow the administrator to specify a particular, trusted DNS in place of the one suggested by an upstream node (e.g., the ISP). An attacker could specify a DNS server under their control instead of a legitimate one. All subsequent resolutions would go through the bad server.

Alternatively, many routers have the ability to replace their firmware (i.e. the internal software that executes the device's more complex services). Like malware on desktop systems, a firmware replacement can be very difficult to detect. A stealthy implementation will appear to behave the same as the manufacturer's firmware; the administration page will look the same, settings will appear correct, etc. This approach, if well executed, could make it difficult for network administrators to discover the reconfiguration, if the device appears to be configured as the administrators intend but actually redirects DNS traffic in the background. Pharming is only one of many attacks that malicious firmware can mount; others include eavesdropping, active man in the middle attacks, and traffic logging. Like misconfiguration, the entire LAN is subject to these actions.

By themselves, these pharming approaches have only academic interest. However, the ubiquity of consumer grade wireless routers presents a massive vulnerability. Administrative access can be available wirelessly on most of these devices. Moreover, since these routers often work with their default settings, administrative passwords are commonly unchanged. Even when altered, many are guessed quickly through dictionary attacks, since most consumer grade routers don't introduce timing penalties for incorrect login attempts. Once administrative access is granted, all of the router's settings including the firmware itself may be altered. These attacks are difficult to trace because they occur outside the home or small office and outside the Internet.

== Instances of pharming ==
On 15 January 2005, the domain name for a large New York ISP, Panix, was hijacked to point to a website in Australia. No financial losses are known. The domain was later restored on 17 January, and ICANN's review blames Melbourne IT (now known as "Arq Group") "as a result of a failure of Melbourne IT to obtain express authorization from the registrant in accordance with ICANN's Inter-Registrar Transfer Policy."

In February 2007, a pharming attack affected at least 50 financial companies in the U.S., Europe, and Asia. Attackers created a similar page for each targeted financial company, which requires effort and time. Victims clicked on a specific website that had a malicious code. This website forced consumers' computers to download a Trojan horse. Subsequent login information from any of the targeted financial companies was collected. The number of individuals affected is unknown but the incident continued for three days.

In January 2008, Symantec reported a drive-by pharming incident, directed against a Mexican bank, in which the DNS settings on a customer's home router were changed after receipt of an e-mail that appeared to be from a legitimate Spanish-language greeting-card company.

== Defences ==
Traditional methods for combating pharming include: Server-side software, DNS protection, and web browser add-ins such as toolbars. Server-side software is typically used by enterprises to protect their customers and employees who use internal or private web-based systems from being pharmed and phished, while browser add-ins allow individual users to protect themselves from phishing. DNS protection mechanisms help ensure that a specific DNS server cannot be hacked and thereby become a facilitator of pharming attacks. Spam filters typically do not provide users with protection against pharming.

Currently the most efficient way to prevent pharming is for end users to make sure they are using secure web connections (HTTPS) to access privacy sensitive sites such as those for banking or taxing, and only accept the valid public key certificates issued by trusted sources. A certificate from an unknown organisation or an expired certificate should not be accepted all the time for crucial business. So-called active cookies provide for a server-side detection tool.

Legislation also plays an essential role in anti-pharming. In March 2005, U.S. Senator Patrick Leahy (D-VT) introduced the Anti-Phishing Act of 2005, a bill that proposes a five-year prison sentence and/or fine for individuals who execute phishing attacks and use information garnered through online fraud such as phishing and pharming to commit crimes such as identity theft.

For home users of consumer-grade routers and wireless access points, perhaps the single most effective defense is to change the password on the router to something other than the default, replacing it with a password that is not susceptible to a dictionary attack.

== Controversy over the use of the term ==
The term "pharming" has been controversial within the field. At a conference organized by the Anti-Phishing Working Group, Phillip Hallam-Baker denounced the term as "a marketing neologism designed to convince banks to buy a new set of security services".

== See also ==
- Phishing
- DNS spoofing
- DNS hijacking
- IT risk
- Mutual authentication
- Trusteer
