= The Farm (Smith novel) =

2014 novel by Tom Rob Smith

- First edition
- Author: Tom Rob Smith
- Language: English
- Genre: Psychological Thriller
- Publisher: Simon & Schuster (UK)
- Publication date: 2014
- Publication place: United Kingdom
- Media type: Print (hardcover)
- Pages: 400
- ISBN: 1-84737-569-3

The Farm (2014) is a psychological thriller novel by Tom Rob Smith. Set in London and Sweden, it is Smith's fourth published work and his first standalone novel.

== Themes ==
The novel confronts issues of mental health, family, and truth. Protagonist Daniel's life is collapsed by an unexpected phone call from his father, who informs him that his mother is suffering from intense paranoid delusions. Daniel's mother, meanwhile, claims that she is wholly sane, insisting that Daniel's father is part of a group that sexually accosts young women in their local Swedish district. Daniel is left torn between his parents and unsure of whom to trust.

== Inspiration ==
Smith was inspired by his own mother's experience of psychosis, from which she has since fully recovered. Smith was surprised by his mother's lucidity when describing her paranoid delusions; he told

"You wouldn't think someone with psychosis could be […] meta-rhetorical. And she was, she was analysing everything she said and seeing how it would come across. And I just thought, well, someone who is psychotic can't be this self-aware. But the whole point is that psychosis makes you hyper-self-aware. The thing that really took me by surprise was how little I knew about mental health."

== Reception ==
The Observer called it "a gripping, atmospheric novel". The Independent also praised the book, commenting that Smith's writing is "so unsettling and oppressive that it blurs the distinctions between sanity and madness, reality and fantasy, leaving the reader guessing until the bitter end." A complimentary review from The Guardian deemed it "a neatly plotted book full of stories within stories, which gradually unravel to confound our expectations [...] Smith's twisting, turning novel shows that Scandi crime also retains the ability to surprise and thrill."

The Farm sold well in its first month, reaching number 2 in The Sunday Times' hardback fiction chart.

== Film adaptation ==
In March 2014, BBC Films and Shine Pictures bought film rights for the book. Ollie Madden, Shine's head of film, will produce the feature, and Christine Langan will executive produce it for BBC Films.
