= 47th Guldbagge Awards =

Swedish awards ceremony

- Date: January 23, 2012
- Site: Cirkus, Stockholm
- Hosted by: Petra Mede

Highlights
- Best Picture: She Monkeys
- Most awards: Kronjuvelerna & She Monkeys (3)
- Most nominations: Simon and the Oaks (13)

Television coverage
- Network: SVT
- Duration: 2 hours

The 47th Guldbagge Awards ceremony, presented by the Swedish Film Institute, honored the best Swedish films of 2011 and took place January 23, 2012, at Cirkus in Stockholm. During the ceremony, the jury presented Guldbagge Awards (commonly referred to as Bagge) in 19 categories. The ceremony was televised in the Sweden by SVT, with actress and comedian Petra Mede hosting the show for the second time in a row.

News for this year is the addition of seven new categories, including Best Editing, Costume, Sound, Makeup, Music, Art Direction and Visual Effects.

She Monkeys won three awards including Best Film and Best Screenplay. Kronjuvelerna also won three awards, all in the technical categories. Other winners included Play, Simon and the Oaks and The Black Power Mixtape 1967-1975 with two awards each, and Happy End, A One-Way Trip to Antibes, At Night I Fly, Las Palmas, A Separation and Beyond the Border with one.

== The jury ==
Among the members of the jury for the films of 2011, were Jannike Åhlund, Klaus Härö and Mikael Marcimain. On the Swedish Film Institute's website, can you read about the rules for the Guldbagge Awards, where you will also find information about the awards, different jury groups, in the nomination process and the choice of the winners.

== Winner and nominees ==
The nominees for the 47th Guldbagge Awards were announced on January 4, 2012 in Stockholm, by the Swedish Film Institute.

Films with the most nominations were Simon and the Oaks with thirteen, followed by Play with seven and Kronjuvelerna with five. The winners were announced during the awards ceremony on January 23, 2012.

=== Awards ===
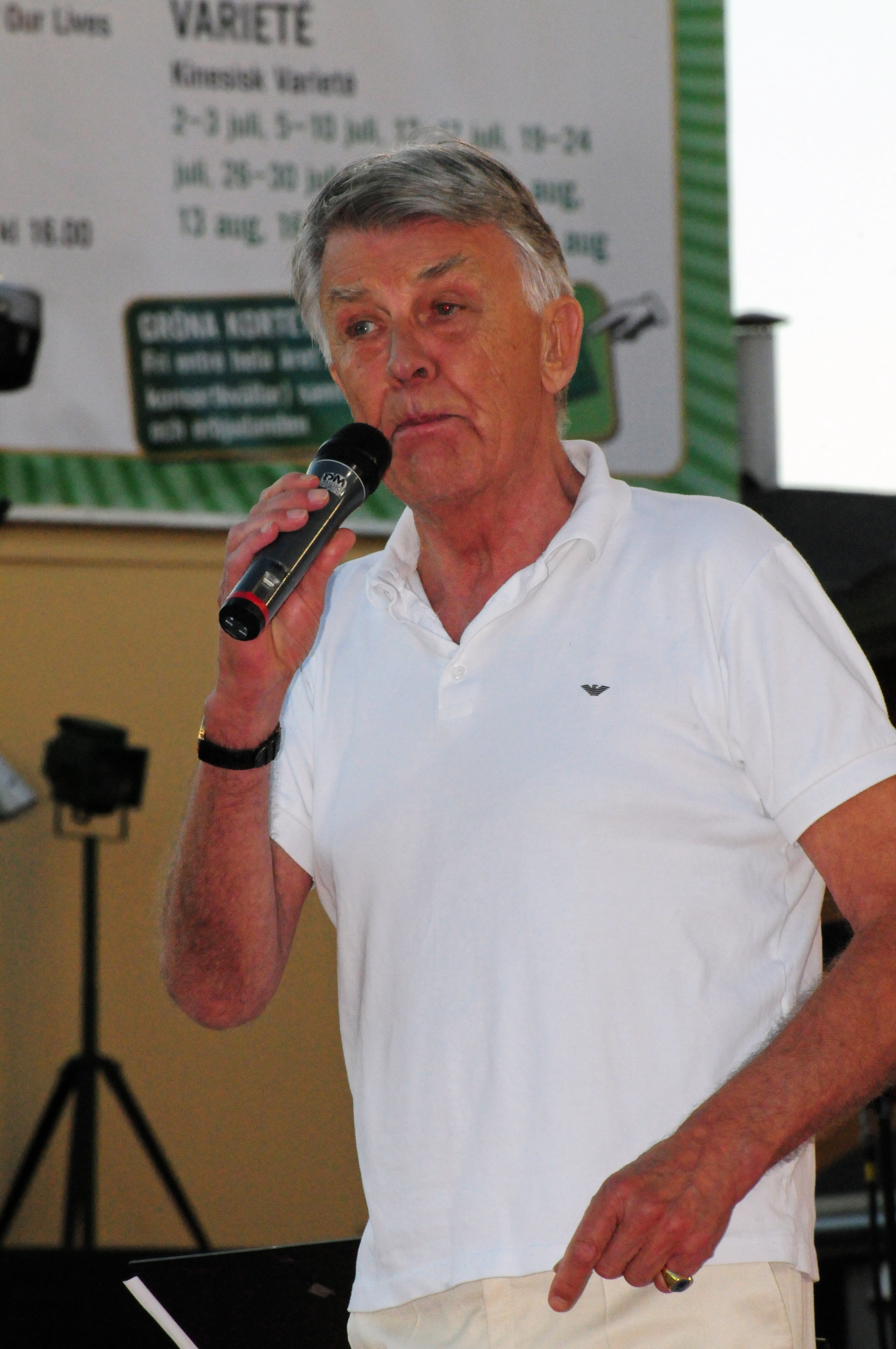
Sven-Bertil Taube, Best Actor winner

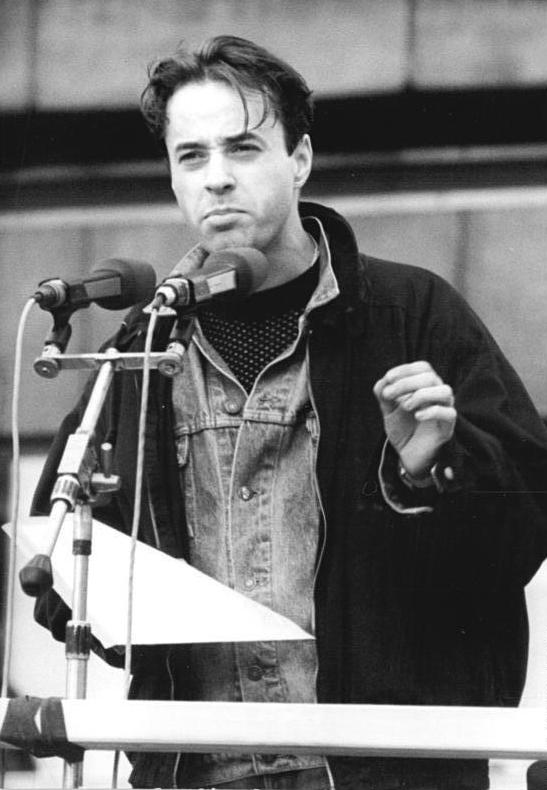
Jan Josef Liefers, Best Supporting Actor winner

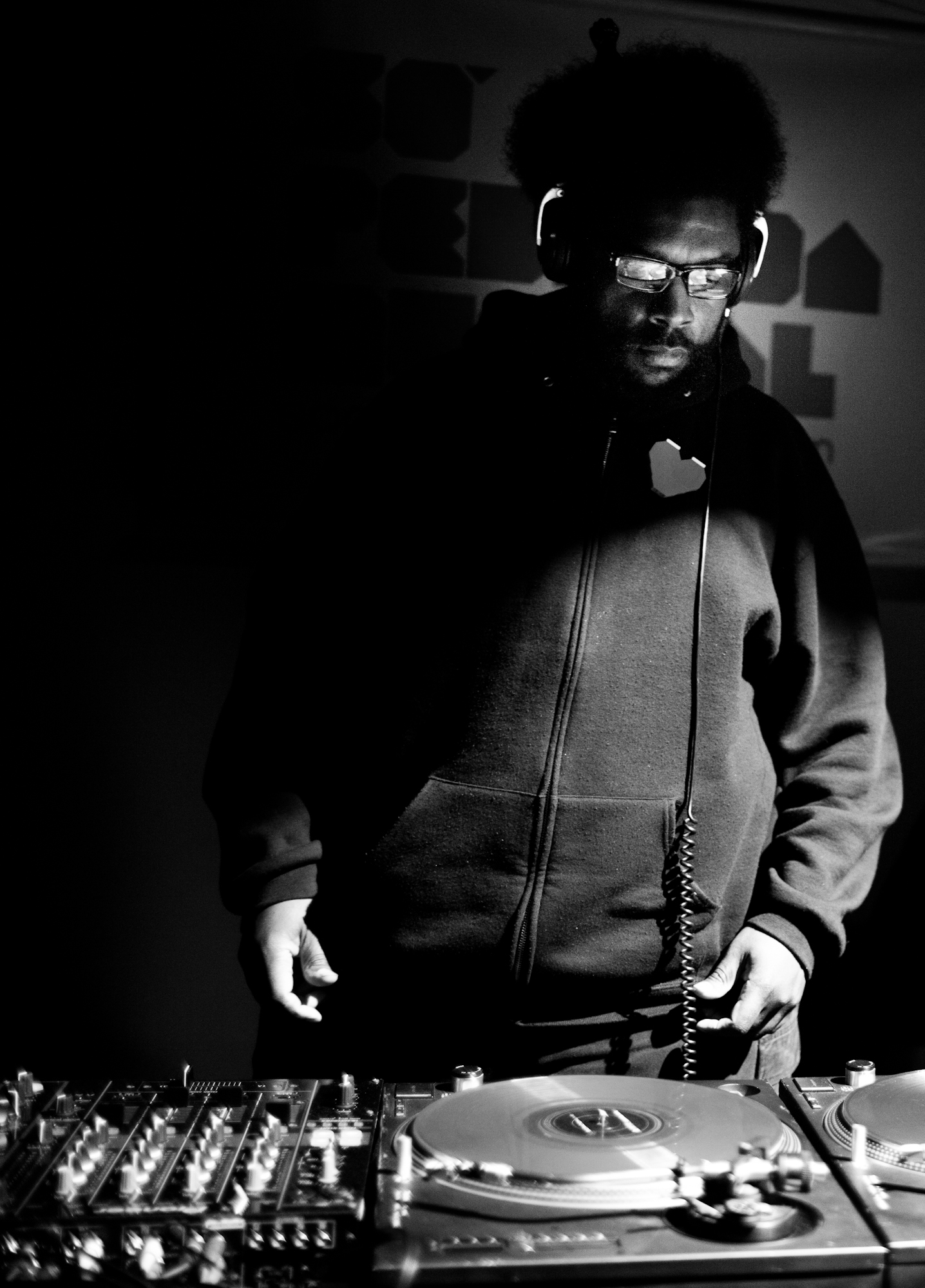
Questlove, Best Music winner

Winners are listed first and highlighted in boldface.

**Best Film**: **She Monkeys**; Simon and the Oaks; Play	**Best Director**: **Ruben Östlund – Play**; Lisa Aschan – She Monkeys; Lisa Ohlin – Simon and the Oaks
**Best Actress in a leading role**: **Ann Petrén – Happy End**; Magdalena Poplawska – Between 2 Fires; Helen Sjöholm – Simon and the Oaks	**Best Actor in a leading role**: **Sven-Bertil Taube – A One-Way Trip to Antibes**; Mikael Persbrandt – Stockholm East; Kevin Vaz – Play
**Best Supporting Actress**: **Cecilia Nilsson – Simon and the Oaks**; Helena Bergström – Någon annanstans i Sverige; Liv Mjönes – Kyss mig	**Best Supporting Actor**: **Jan Josef Liefers – Simon and the Oaks**; Peter Andersson – Happy End; Johan Widerberg – Happy End
**Best Screenplay**: **Josefine Adolfsson and Lisa Aschan – She Monkeys**; Pernilla Oljelund – Stockholm East; Ruben Östlund – Play	**Best Cinematography**: **Marius Dybwad Brandrud – Play**; Per Källberg – Stockholm East; Dan Laustsen – Simon and the Oaks
**Best Documentary Feature**: **At Night I Fly – Michel Wenzer**; Stora scenen – Tova Mozard; The Black Power Mixtape 1967-1975 – Göran Hugo Olsson	**Best Shortfilm**: **Las Palmas – Johannes Nyholm**; No Sex Just Understand – Mariken Halle; Utan snö – Magnus von Horn
**Best Foreign Film**: **A Separation (Iran)**; Dogtooth (Greece); Winter's Bone (United States)	**Best Visual Effects**: **Håkan Blomdahl and Torbjörn Olsson – Kronjuvelerna**; Johan Harnesk – Gränsen; Marcus B Brodersen and Lars-Eric Hansen – Simon and the Oaks
**Best Art Direction**: **Roger Rosenberg – Kronjuvelerna**; Anders Engelbrecht, Lena Selander and Folke Strömbäck – Simon and the Oaks; Cian Bornebusch – The Stig-Helmer story	**Best Original Score**: **Ahmir "Questlove" Thompson and Om'Mas Keith – The Black Power Mixtape 1967-1975**; Fredrik Emilson – Kronjuvelerna; Annette Focks – Simon and the Oaks
**Makeup and Hair**: **Anna-Lena Melin – Beyond the Border**; Sara Klänge – Kronjuvelerna; Linda Boije af Gennäs – Simon and the Oaks	**Best Sound Editing**: **Andreas Franck i She Monkeys**; Per Hallberg and Daniel Saxlid – Försvunnen; Jason Luke – Simon and the Oaks
**Best Costume Design**: **Moa Li Lemhagen Schalin – Kronjuvelerna**; Pia Aleborg – Play; Katja Watkins – Simon and the Oaks	**Honorary Award**: **Inga Landgré, actress**
**Best Film Editing**: **Göran Hugo Olsson and Hanna Lejonqvist – The Black Power Mixtape 1967-1975**; Kasper Leick and Michal Leszczylowski – Simon and the Oaks; Jacob Schulsinger – Play	**Gullspira** Gullspiran is assigned to a person who has made outstanding contributions in the Swedish children's film.: **Ylva Li and Lennart Gustafsson, producers of animated short films and books for children.**

== Multiple nominations and awards ==
Thirty-four films (twenty-two features and twelve documentaries) were released in Sweden in 2011 and were eligible for nomination. Among these films, fifteen of them got at least one nomination.

The following films received one or multiple nominations:

- Thirteen: Simon and the Oaks
- Seven: Play
- Five: Kronjuvelerna
- Four: She Monkeys
- Three: The Black Power Mixtape 1967-1975, Happy End, Stockholm East
- Two: Beyond the Border
- One: Between 2 Fires, Kyss mig, Försvunnen, A One-Way Trip to Antibes, Någon annanstans i Sverige, The Stig-Helmer story, At Night I Fly, Stora scenen

The following four films received multiple awards:

- Three: She Monkeys and Kronjuvelerna
- Two: Play, Simon and the Oaks and The Black Power Mixtape 1967-1975
