= Simon and the Oaks =

1985 novel by Marianne Fredriksson

- Author: Marianne Fredriksson
- Original title: Simon och ekarna
- Language: Swedish
- Genre: Historical fiction
- Set in: 1940s
- Publication date: 1985
- Publication place: Sweden
- English publication date: 2000
- Media type: Print (hardback, paperback)
- Pages: 357 pages (2000 English language edition)
- ISBN: 0753810751
- Preceded by: Paradisets barn
- Followed by: Den som vandrar om natten

Simon and the Oaks (Swedish: Simon och ekarna) is a 1985 novel by Marianne Fredriksson. The book is set in Gothenburg predominantly during the 1940s and uses the persecution of Jewish people during World War II as a backdrop. The book was later adapted into a Guldbagge Award-winning feature film by the same name starring Bill Skarsgård. After its release Simon and the Oaks became a bestseller and has since been translated into 25 languages.

== Synopsis ==
The book follows the Swedish man Simon Larsson throughout his childhood, adolescence, and adulthood. He grew up in Gothenburg with his adoptive parents, Karin and Erik, who are both of the working class. He befriends a wealthy classmate, Isaak Lentov. Isaak and his family formerly lived in Germany but were forced to flee due to the Nazi party's persecution of Jewish people and the mentally ill, as Isaak's mother has a mental illness. After his mother's illness requires that she stay in a mental institution, Isaak begins to spend more time with Simon's mother Karin, who becomes a mother figure for him.

== Reception and awards ==
Fredriksson received the BMF prize (BMF-plaketten) for Simon och ekarna in 1985. The book is also included in the compilation work Tusen svenska klassiker (One Thousand Swedish Classics) from 2009, which lists works, including 170 works of literature, that the authors deem to be Swedish cultural classics.

== Adaptations ==
The book has been adapted twice. The first adaptation was a stage play that was written by Kjell Sundstedt and directed by Niklas Hjulström, and performed at the Folkteatern during 2002 and 2004.

The second adaptation was a feature film that was directed by Lisa Ohlin. The film adaptation received critical acclaim and was nominated for 13 Guldbagge Awards, winning two for Best Supporting Actor (Jan Josef Liefers) and Best Supporting Actress (Cecilia Nilsson).
