= African Independence =

- Directed by: Tukufu Zuberi
- Screenplay by: Tukufu Zuberi
- Produced by: Tukufu Zuberi
- Narrated by: Tukufu Zuberi
- Cinematography: Tanji Gilliam; John Hazard; William Charles Moss; Jabari Zuberi
- Edited by: Jabari Zuberi; Tukufu Zuberi
- Music by: Hannibal Locumbe
- Production company: TZ Production Company
- Release date: 2013
- Running time: 120 minutes
- Country: United States
- Language: English

African Independence is a 2013 feature-length documentary film and the directorial debut of sociologist Tukufu Zuberi, who also hosts the film. The film premiered at the San Diego Black Film Festival in January 2013 and in 2015, Zuberi published a companion book through Rowman & Littlefield.

== Synopsis ==
The film focuses on the African Independence Movements and the problems confronted by these movements to win independence. The film tells the story through interviews with independence activists and leaders who helped achieve independence for the African people. By focusing on four watershed events-World War Two, the end of colonialism, the Cold War, and the era of African Republics, African Independence tells the story of African history, past and present. Tukufu Zuberi is also the host of the film.

== African Independence: How Africa Shapes the World ==
In 2015 Zuberi released a companion book to the film, African Independence: How Africa Shapes the World, through Rowman & Littlefield.

The book was reviewed by Paul Chiudza Banda for African Studies Quarterly. In his review Banda notes that Zuberi "overlooks the fact that African decolonization was not just achieved because of the role of nationalism alone" and that he failed to add that colonial policy changes towards Africa post World War II contributed to the decolonization. He further advised readers to note that Zuberi used two approaches in the film, the postcolonial approach and transnational approach when discussing the decolonization, and that Zuberi had a noticeable bias towards African nationalism when talking about the Decolonization of Africa.

== Awards ==
- Best Documentary Film at the San Diego Black Film Festival (2013, won)
- Best Director at the San Diego Black Film Festival (2013, won - Tukufu Zuberi)

== See also ==
- Concerning Violence
