= List of novels set in Gothenburg =

This article provides an incomplete list of novels set in Gothenburg. Included is the date of first publication.

== Twentieth century ==
=== 1980s ===
- Simon and the Oaks – Marianne Fredriksson (1985)

=== 1990s ===
- Hanna's Daughters – Marianne Fredriksson (1994)

== Twenty-first century ==
=== 2010s ===
- Skulle jag dö under andra himlar – Johannes Anyuru (2010)
