= Vår teater =

Swedish children's theatre company

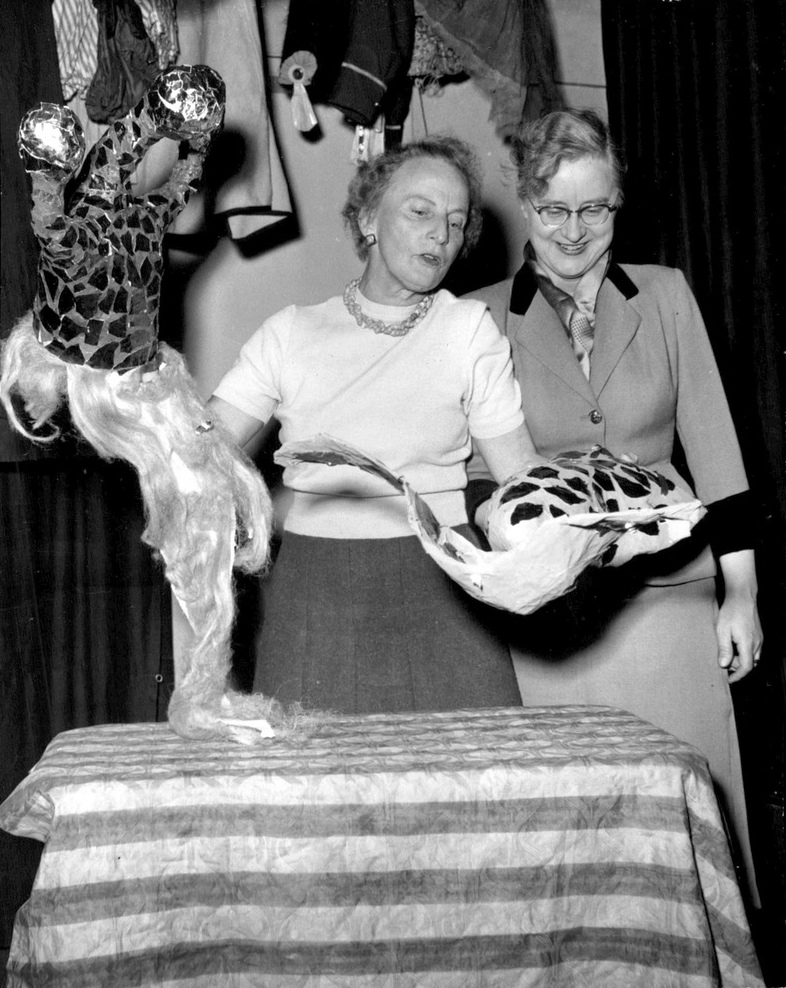
Elsa Olenius and Karin Notini with props at the Children's Theatre, 1955.

Vår teater (lit. 'Our Theatre') is a pioneering Swedish theatre company for children with a number of stages around Stockholm, founded in 1942.

== History ==
In the late 1920s and 1930s, librarian Elsa Olenius pioneered storytelling and simple theatre games and pantomime for children at the Stockholm City Library's Hornsgatan branch, an activity that grew in popularity as more and more children became interested. In 1941–1942, Ingmar Bergman ran Sweden's first children's theatre in Medborgarhuset under the name Sagoteatern, a children's branch of his amateur theatre company for adults, Medborgarteatern. When his work there ended, Olenius took over the premises in 1942 and started a more developed children's theatre activity for interested children between seven and sixteen years old, with improvisation exercises to music, pantomime and other exercises. Gradually, real performances for audiences were created and eventually it was called Vår teater. Astrid Lindgren, among others, wrote plays specifically for the theatre.

As a result of the large number of children and good economic growth, the Stockholm City Council decided in 1955 to support the proposal of the Children's Welfare Board to allow Vår teater to create more permanent children's theatres around the city, initially in Årsta, Gröndal and Hägersten. A theatre management course was also set up under Olenius' direction and in the autumn of 1958 Olenius became Sweden's first children's theatre consultant and subsequently the head of a Greater Stockholm theatre agency. In 1969 there were ten different Vår teater stages; in 1992 there were 14 permanent stages and some 40 additional groups in the Greater Stockholm area. In 1996, Vår teater merged with the Stockholm Municipal Music School and became Kulturskolan Stockholm. By 2002, around 150,000 children had participated in Vår teater's activities, including many well-known theatre and cultural figures including Marika Lagercrantz, Tomas Bolme, Cecilia Nilsson, Rebecka Liljeberg, Josephine Bornebusch, Anita Wall, and more.

== Society ==
After Olenius' death in 1984, the Friends of Vår teater Society – the Elsa Olenius Society – was established in 1988 to provide advocacy management and financial assistance related to Vår teater, and also to award the Penguin Prize to a person or an organization that has in one way or another been responsible for extraordinary work in the field of children and youth culture.
