= Simon and the Oaks (film) =

- Directed by: Lisa Ohlin
- Written by: Marnie Blok
- Based on: Simon and the Oaks by Marianne Fredriksson
- Produced by: Christer Nilson; Per Holst
- Starring: Bill Skarsgård; Helen Sjöholm; Jan Josef Liefers; Cecilia Nilsson
- Cinematography: Dan Laustsen
- Edited by: Kasper Leick; Michal Leszczylowski; Anders Nylander
- Music by: Annette Focks
- Production companies: GötaFilm AB; Filmkameratene A/S; Asta Film ApS; Schmidtz Katze Filmkollektiv GmbH
- Distributed by: Nordisk Film
- Release date: 9 December 2011 (Sweden)
- Running time: 122 minutes
- Countries: Sweden, Germany
- Language: Swedish

Simon and the Oaks (Swedish: Simon och ekarna) is a Swedish drama film which was released to cinemas in Sweden on 9 December 2011, directed by Lisa Ohlin and starring Bill Skarsgård. The film is based on the novel with the same name by Marianne Fredriksson. The film was nominated in 13 categories at the 47th Guldbagge Awards, won two of the awards: Cecilia Nilsson for Best Actress in a Supporting Role for the role as Inga, and Jan Josef Liefers for Best Actor in a Supporting Role as Ruben Lentov.

Ohlin took over as director for the film, after the director Björn Runge in April 2009 announced that he would drop out of the production. In May 2009, the Swedish Film Institute (SFI) announced that Ohlin quit her job as film commissioner at the SFI to direct the film.

== Plot ==
The film is about Simon (Bill Skarsgård), growing up in a working-class family on the outskirts of Gothenburg during World War II. He is very talented and always felt different and an outsider. Against his parents' approval, he seeks education in the arts, normally not attended by members of the working class at the time. There he meets Isaak (Karl Linnertorp), the son of a wealthy Jewish bookseller who fled persecution in Nazi Germany. The lives of the two boys and their families intertwine as the war rages in Europe. At the end of the war, it becomes clear to Simon that his life, family and his very identity will no longer be the same.

== Cast ==
- Bill Skarsgård as Simon Larsson
- Helen Sjöholm as Karin Larsson
- Jan Josef Liefers as Ruben Lentov
- Stefan Gödicke as Erik Larsson
- Karl Linnertorp as Isak Lentov
- Jonatan Wächter as young Simon
- Karl Martin Eriksson as young Isak
- Erica Löfgren as Klara
- Katharina Schüttler as Iza
- Josefin Neldén as Mona
- Lena Nylén as Olga
- Cecilia Nilsson as Inga
- Jan-Erik Emretsson as Klas, neighbor
- Pär Brundin as Åke, neighbor
- Frederik Nilsson as Teacher
- Hermann Beyer as Ernst Habermann
- Sven-Åke Gustavsson as a Professor
- Jan Holmquist as a Doctor
- Iwar Wiklander as a Headmaster
- Peter Borenstein as a Rabbi
- Dellie Kamijo as Malin, age 5
- Johanna Malmsten as Malin, age 2
- Tage Wirenhed as Malin, as a baby
- Max Wulfson as musician in Berlin, solo violin
- Jörg Fröhlich as musician in Berlin, contrabass
- Peter Bock as musician in Berlin, viola
- Sebastian Selke as musician in Berlin, cello
- André Peter as musician in Berlin, violin

== Accolades ==
Simon and the Oaks was nominated for 13 Guldbagge Awards, and won two.

Award	Date of ceremony	Category	Recipients and nominees	Result
Guldbagge Award	January 23, 2012	Best Film	Christer Nilson	Nominated
Guldbagge Award	January 23, 2012	Best Director	Lisa Ohlin	Nominated
Guldbagge Award	January 23, 2012	Best Actress	Helen Sjöholm	Nominated
Guldbagge Award	January 23, 2012	Best Supporting Actor	Jan Josef Liefers	Won
Guldbagge Award	January 23, 2012	Best Supporting Actress	Cecilia Nilsson	Won
Guldbagge Award	January 23, 2012	Best Visual Effects	Marcus B. Brodersen and Lars Erik Hansen	Nominated
Guldbagge Award	January 23, 2012	Best Original Score	Anette Focks	Nominated
Guldbagge Award	January 23, 2012	Best Costume Design	Katja Watkins	Nominated
Guldbagge Award	January 23, 2012	Best Art Direction	Anders Engelbrecht, Lena Selander and Folke Strömbäck	Nominated
Guldbagge Award	January 23, 2012	Best Make-up/Hair	Linda Boije af Gennäs	Nominated
Guldbagge Award	January 23, 2012	Best Cinematography	Dan Laustsen	Nominated
Guldbagge Award	January 23, 2012	Best Sound Editing	Jason Luke	Nominated
Guldbagge Award	January 23, 2012	Best Film Editing	Kasper Leick and Michal Leszczylowski	Nominated
