= Elsa Olenius =

Swedish librarian and author (1896–1984)

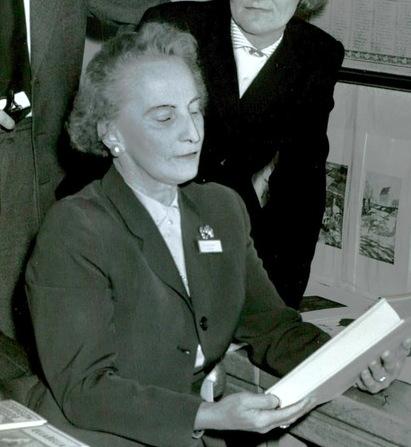
- Elsa Olenius (1954)
- Born: 30 September 1896; Bollnäs, Hälsingland, Sweden
- Died: 25 August 1984 (aged 87); Danderyd, Sweden
- Burial place: Norra begravningsplatsen
- Occupations: Librarian, theatre educator

Elsa Viktoria Olenius (September 30, 1896 – August 25, 1984) was a Swedish librarian and writer, best remembered for pioneering children's library activities and theatre with children. She was awarded a Gulliver Prize in 1981.

In the 1940s, she founded Barnens egen teater ('the Children's Own Theatre'), which later became Vår teater ('Our Theatre').

== Biography ==
=== Upbringing and studies ===
Elsa Olenius was born in 1896 in Bollnäs, Hälsingland, Sweden. She was the only child of Otto Söderström, a postal inspector, and Blenda Johnson. Both her parents were interested in theatre and her father was also an amateur musician. Fairytales and storytelling were a part of her childhood which would later make a mark on her career. When the family moved to Örebro, Olenius was introduced to theatre. She later performed at the gymnasium theatre and then at the student theatre in Uppsala, where she graduated from the Uppsala private gymnasium in 1914 at the age of 17.

In 1919, she married Nils Edvin Olenius (1893–1964), a customs inspector.

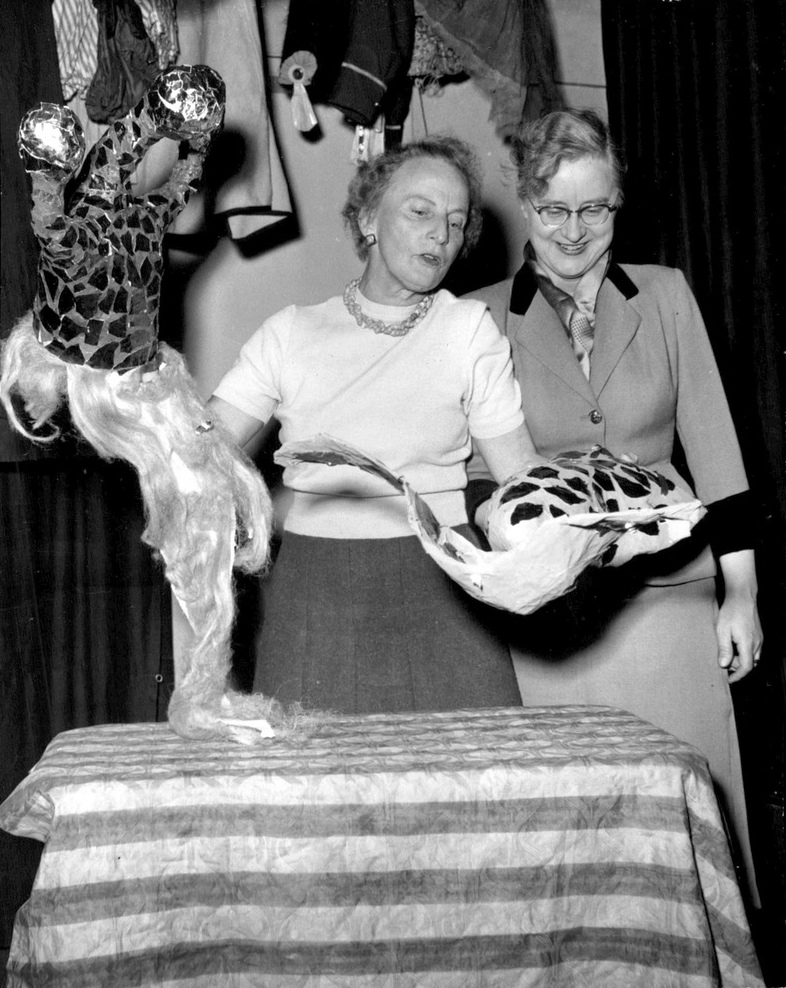
Elsa Olenius and Karin Notini with props at the Children's Theatre

Between 1925 and 1927, Olenius was a student at the Stockholm Children's and Youth Library, and on 16 December 1927 she was hired at the second branch of the Stockholm City Library on Hornsgatan in Södermalm.

Olenius has been described as author Astrid Lindgren's "friend and mentor", and Lindgren wrote plays for Olenius' children's theatre.

=== Professional life ===
As a children's librarian at Hornsgatan Library, Olenius began holding storytelling events for children, and in the late 1920s and 1930s she began her children's theatre activities, in which children were involved with drama and pantomime. Influenced by her own childhood, she focused on storytelling at a time when it was critiqued for being "un-nuanced" and "black-and-white".

In 1942, with the support of the Social Democratic Municipal Commissioner, Oscar Larsson, Olenius was able to take over a room in the civic hall Medborgarhuset, where Ingmar Bergman had previously directed plays for both children and adults. There, Olenius began an open house for the children of Södermalm on Saturdays. Children between the ages of seven and sixteen could try pantomime theatre and improvisation to music, as a continuation and expansion of the storytelling sessions. She encouraged children to actively experience the roles, stating, "But most important of all is that thought and empathy are given enough time. For those who play pantomime, the rule applies: Think, see and feel before you move! Let your eyes react first, then your face, head – and finally the rest of your body!" The theatre was first called Barnens egen teater ('the Children's Own Theatre'), and then Vår teater ('Our Theatre') from 1955, when the children's theatre activities became an institution in their own right within the Children's Welfare Board, with new branches in the suburbs of Stockholm. Olenius then conducted a theatre management course to provide them with trained theatre managers. She also published several collections of plays to be performed by children, with the aim of promoting their personalities and development.

She was also on the jury of the Rabén & Sjögren screenplay competition, where Astrid Lindgren's first book The Confidences of Britt-Mari won second prize.

In 1958, Olenius was appointed to the first children's theatre consultant position established in Sweden.

Olenius died in Danderyd in 1984 and is buried in Norra begravningsplatsen.

== Bibliography ==
- Med Britta och bilen på långresa (in Swedish). Uppsala: Lindblad. 1938. OCLC 186418979.
- Barnteater (in Swedish). Stockholm: Ljus. 1957. OCLC 770672820.
- Vår teater: Stockholms stads barn- och ungdomsteater (in Swedish). Stockholm: Barnavårdsnämndens fritidsavdeling. 1960. OCLC 186254829.
- John Bauers sagovärld: en vandring bland tomtar och troll, riddare och prinsessor tillsammans med några av våra främsta sagodiktare (in Swedish). Stockholm: Albert Bonniers förlag. 1966. OCLC 67018341.

== Awards ==
- Expressens Heffaklump (1979)
- Gulliver Prize (1981)
- Litteraturfrämjandet's Vingpennan (1981)
- Bengt Hjelmqvist Prize (1984)
