= Fanny Ketter =

Swedish actress (born 1996)

- Born: Fanny Lucille Ketter; January 22, 1996 (age 30); Lilla Uppåkra, Sweden
- Occupation: Actress

Fanny Lucille Ketter (born 22 January 1996) is a Swedish actress. She is the daughter of visual artist and musician Clay Ketter and Jenny Mark Ketter, communications officer at IM, a Swedish NGO.

Fanny started samhällsvetenskapsprogrammet (social science programme) in August 2012 at S:t Petriskolan in Malmö.

In 2013 she got a stipendium from the United World Colleges and she is now studying at Red Cross Nordic in Norway.

She started her career by playing Billie in the Swedish TV-series Vid Vintergatans slut. She was the only human that was filmed in front of a greenscreen, because the space suit she was wearing was blue.

== Filmography ==
=== Film ===
- 2012 – Bitch Hug
- 2013 – Reel
- 2014 – Her er Harold
- 2014 – Hot Nasty Teen
- 2015 – Eternal Summer

=== Television ===
- 2010 – Vid Vintergatans slut
- 2010–2011 Gabba Gabba
- 2011 – The Bridge
