= Tukufu Zuberi =

American sociologist (born 1959)

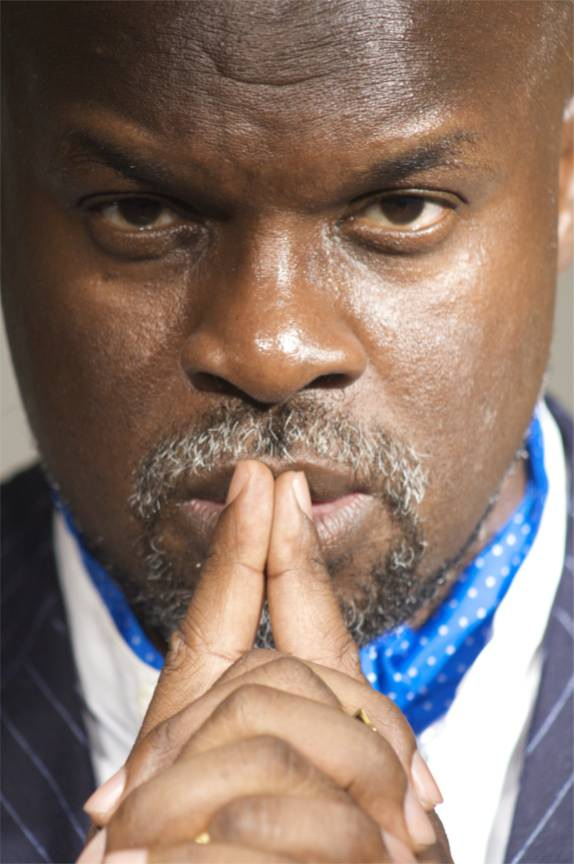
- Tukufu Zuberi (2010)
- Born: Antonio McDaniel; April 26, 1959 (age 67); Oakland, California, United States
- Education: San Jose State (BA); Sacramento State (MA); University of Chicago (PhD)
- Occupations: sociologist, professor, TV personality, social critic, documentary filmmaker, writer,
- Writing career
- Genres: Sociology, filmmaking, history
- Subjects: Sociology, history, Africa

Tukufu Zuberi (born April 26, 1959) is an American sociologist, filmmaker, social critic, educator, and writer. Zuberi has appeared in several documentaries on Africa and the African diaspora, including Liberia: America's Stepchild (2002), and 500 Years Later (2005). He is one of the hosts of the long-running PBS program History Detectives. As founder of his own production company, he produced the film African Independence, which premiered at the San Diego Black Film Festival in January 2013. He is the Lasry Family Professor of Race Relations, professor and chair of the sociology department, and professor of Africana studies at the University of Pennsylvania.

== Biography ==
Born Antonio McDaniel to Willie and Annie McDaniel, and raised in the housing projects of Oakland, California in the 1970s, he changed his name to Tukufu Zuberi, which is Swahili for "beyond praise" and "strength". Zuberi says that he "took the name because of a desire to make and have a connection with an important period where people were challenging what it means to be a human being."

Zuberi received a bachelor's degree from San Jose State in 1981, a master's degree from Sacramento State in 1985, and a PhD from the University of Chicago in 1989. In 1988, he joined the faculty of the University of Pennsylvania, where he became the Lasry Family Professor of Race Relations, the chair of the sociology department between 2007 and 2013, and the director of the Center for Africana Studies between 2002 and 2008. He has been a visiting professor at Makerere University in Kampala, Uganda, and the University of Dar es Salaam in Tanzania.

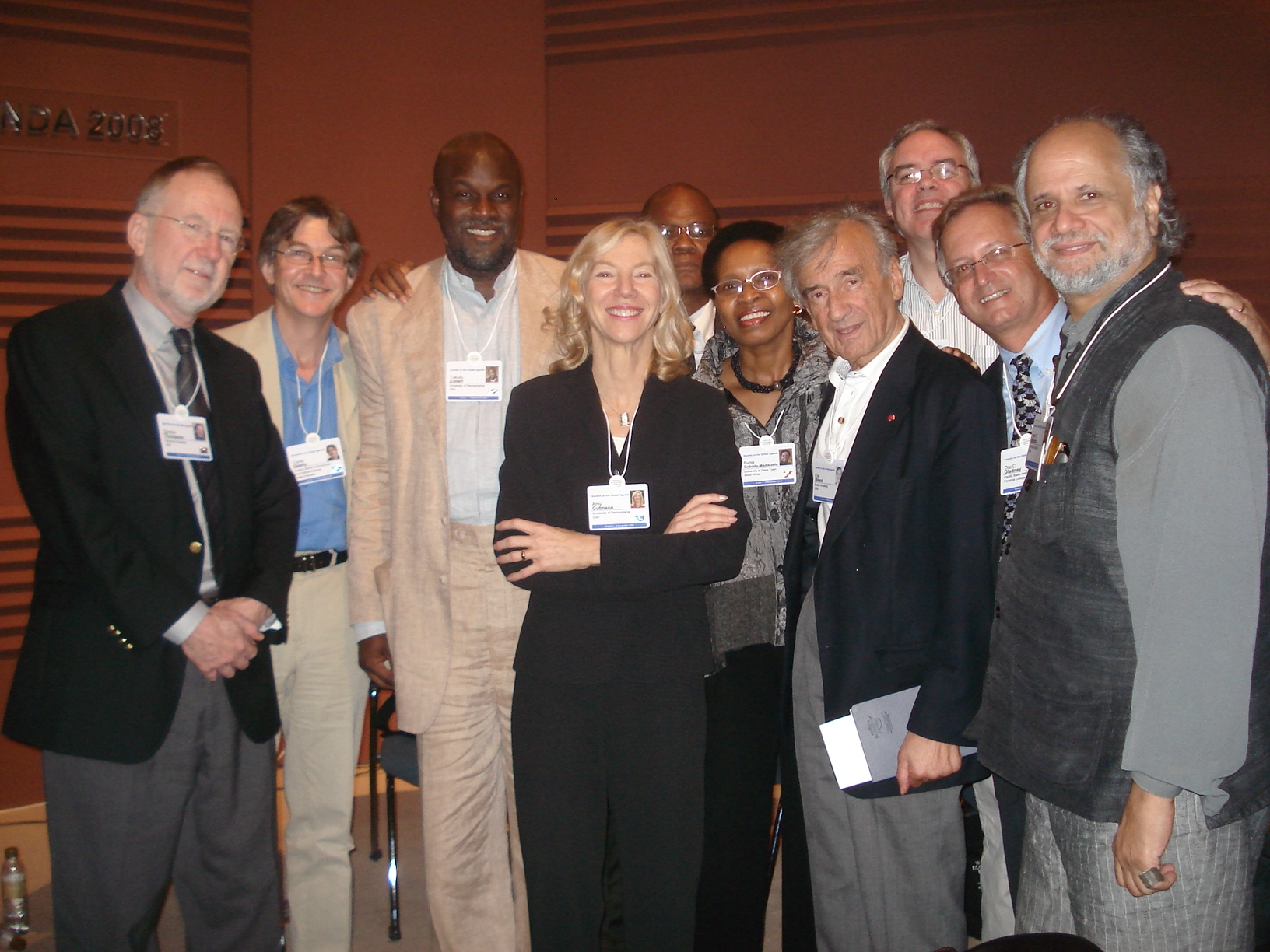
The Human Equality and Respect Council at the World Economic Forum, 2008. From left: Dennis Frank Thompson, Conor Gearty, Tukufu Zuberi, Amy Gutmann, Pumla Gobodo-Madikizela, Elie Wiesel, Thomas Sugrue, Dru C. Gladney, Homi K. Bhabha

Zuberi's research focuses on race and African and African diaspora populations. He has conducted research in the fields of social statistics and population studies (demography). He has been a guest lecturer at colleges and universities and on television programs.

In 2013, Zuberi produced his first documentary, African Independence. The film premiered at the San Diego Black Film Festival in January 2013. The film discusses the beginning of the independence movement and the problems faced by the movement to win independence in Africa.

== Educational career ==
Professor Tukufu Zuberi is the Lasry Family Professor of Race Relations, and Professor of Sociology and Africana Studies at the University of Pennsylvania. He has been a visiting professor at Makerere University in Kampala, Uganda; the University of Dar es Salaam in Tanzania; in 2014 he held the chair of the Institute for Advanced Interdisciplinary Studies, Federal University of Minas Gerais (UFMG), in Belo Horizonte, MG, Brazil; and in 2016 he served as the distinguished visiting professor for the Coordination Foundation for the Improvement of Higher Education Personnel- CAPES at the University of Brasilia and the Federal University of Bahia. During his time at the University of Pennsylvania he has served as the chair of the Graduate Group in Demography, the director of the African Studies Program, the director of the Afro-American Studies Program, and faculty associate director of the Center for Africana Studies. From 2002 to 2008, he served as the founding director of the Center for Africana Studies. From 2007 to 2013, he served as chair of the department of sociology.

Zuberi's educational career ranges from teaching to formal demographic analysis, archival creation and research, writing, curator of museum exhibitions, hosting a TV series (the PBS History Detectives), and producing and directing documentaries. His work is collaborative, interdisciplinary, and academically rigorous. His work ranges from the hard social sciences to the softest of the humanities.

His research interests have focused on sociology, demography, and Africana Studies. Zuberi is the author of "Swing Low, Sweet Chariot: The Mortality Cost of Colonizing Liberia in the Nineteenth-Century", published by the University of Chicago Press in 1995; "Thicker than Blood: How Racial Statistics Lie", published by the University of Minnesota Press in 2001; "Más espeso que la sangre: la mentira del análisis estadístico según teorías biológicas de la raza", published by Bogotá: Universidad Nacional de Colombia, in 2013; and "Africa Independence: How Africa Shapes the World", published by Rowman & Littlefield Publishers in 2015. He has edited or co-edited eight volumes. These edited volumes include "White Logic, White Methods: Racism and Methodology" (with Eduardo Bonilla-Silva) that was awarded the Oliver Cromwell Cox Book Award by the American Sociological Association.

== Curatorial Projects ==
Zuberi is the curator of several exhibitions. He curated Tides of Freedom: African Presence on the Delaware at the Independence Seaport Museum (Premiered in May 2013). He produced and directed five interstitials for inclusion in the Tides of Freedom gallery. His exhibition, Black Bodies in Propaganda: The Art of the War Poster premiered at the University of Pennsylvania Museum of Archaeology and Anthropology in June 2013. Black Bodies in Propaganda presents 33 posters from Zuberi's private collection. The Black Bodies in Propaganda exhibit was also presented at the Northwest African American Museum in Seattle, Washington (2016), and at the Thomas Gilcrease Institute of American History and Art, Tulsa, Oklahoma (2017). Professor Zuberi curated the redesign of the Penn Museum Africa Gallery "AFRICA GALLERIES from Maker to Museum" (2019). He directed ten interstitials for inclusion in the AFRICA GALLERIES from Maker to Museum gallery.

== African Census Analysis Project ==
Zuberi has headed the African Census Analysis Project (ACAP), a project initiated by the United Nations to advance the process of census enumeration in Africa. Although census-taking eventually became routine, the preservation and analysis of the resultant data were not fully developed within African statistical offices. In recognition of the need to preserve African census data, to avoid perpetual loss due to poor storage, and to encourage and enhance further analysis, dissemination, and utilization of the massive census data, ACAP was undertaken as a joint initiative of the Population Studies Center at the University of Pennsylvania and African governmental and research institutions. The goal was to promote collaboration among African governments and research institutions at archiving and analyzing African census data, both at national and sub-national levels, and to inform appropriate policy interventions on the continent.

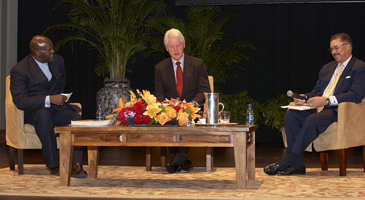
The Kerner Plus 40 Symposium, 2008. From left: Tukufu Zuberi, former U.S. President Bill Clinton, and DeWayne Wickham

== History Detectives ==
Zuberi is a host on the PBS television program History Detectives. The show devotes itself "to exploring the complexities of historical mysteries, searching out the facts, myths and conundrums that connect local folklore, family legends and interesting objects." Zuberi has taken the audience on an investigation by racing around Death Valley in a 1932 Ford roadster and tracked down a Japanese internment camp survivor. Producer of the show, Tony Tackaberry says "Along with his expertise, Tukufu has a strong, engaging, excited personality that comes through."

== Documentary Projects ==
He is the writer and producer of African Independence, a feature-length documentary film that highlights the birth, realization, and problems confronted by the movement to win independence in Africa. African Independence was selected and featured at over a dozen film festivals, and was the recipient of various awards. Completed in 2020, his feature-length documentary on the history of ancient Ghana, Mali, and Songhay is entitled Before Things Fell Apart (2020). His most recent short documentary on African material culture in museums is entitled Decolonizing the Narrative: Africa Galleries from Maker to Museum (2020). The first in a series of 3 short documentaries, Africa Galleries from Maker to Museum, is a 33-minute exploration of the debates about Museums, Reparations; Restitution; and Race.

== Publications ==
=== Book Projects ===
- Tukufu Zuberi. African Independence: How Africa Shapes the World (Lanham: Rowman & Littlefield, 2015).
- Tukufu Zuberi. Thicker Than Blood: An Essay on how Racial Statistics Lie (Minneapolis: University of Minnesota Press, 2001). Honorable Mention for the 2002 Gustavus Myers Book Award. ISBN 978-0816639090
- Antonio McDaniel. Swing Low, Sweet Chariot: The Mortality Cost of Colonizing Liberia in the Nineteenth-Century (Chicago: University of Chicago Press, 1995).

=== Edited volumes ===
- Tukufu Zuberi and Eduardo Bonilla-Silva (editors). White Logic, White Methods: Race and Methodology (New York: Rowman and Littlefield Publishers, Inc., 2008) — Winner of the 2009 Oliver Cromwell Cox Book Award, American Sociological Association.
- Tukufu Zuberi, Amson Sibanda and Eric Udjo (editors). The Demography of South Africa Volume 1 of the General Demography of Africa series, General Editor Tukufu Zuberi (New York: M.E. Sharpe, 2005).

=== Edited journal issues ===
- Tukufu Zuberi and Tanji Gilliam (Special Editors), "Perspectives on Africa and the World". The Annals of the American Academy of Political and Social Science, November 2010, vol. 632 (132 pages).
- Tukufu Zuberi and Gale Garrison (guest editors), "Back to the Future of Civilization: Celebrating 30 Years of African American Studies". Special Issue of Journal of Black Studies 2004, Vol. 35, Number 2.
- Tukufu Zuberi (guest editor), "Racial Statistics and Public Policy". Special issue of Race and Society 2003 (mistakenly listed as 2001 on volume cover), Volume 4, Issue 2 (132 pages).
- Laura Chrisman, Farah Griffin and Tukufu Zuberi (guest editors), "Transcending Traditions: African, African Diaspora, and African American Studies in the 21st Century", Special issue of Black Scholar 2000, Vol. 30, No. 3-4 (80 pages).
- Elijah Anderson and Tukufu Zuberi (guest editors) "The Study of African American Problems: Papers In Honor of W.E.B. Du Bois". Special issue of The Annals of the American Academy of Political and Social Science 2000, vol. 568 (316 pages).

=== Selected video clips ===
- African Independence Trailer
- History Detectives – Fan Q&A
- How Many in the Slave Trade
- Global Agenda Summit-Dubai-2008
- "Divided and Dangerous: Human History from a Different Angle"
- "The Final Demographic Racial Transition"
