= Israel Palestine on Swedish TV 1958-1989 =

2024 Swedish documentary by Göran Hugo Olsson

- Swedish theatrical release poster
- Swedish: Israel Palestina på svensk tv 1958–1989
- Directed by: Göran Hugo Olsson
- Written by: Göran Hugo Olsson
- Produced by: Tobias Janson
- Edited by: Britta Norell
- Music by: Gary Nilsson
- Production companies: Film i Väst; Story AB; Ström Pictures; Sveriges Television; Tekele Productions
- Release dates: 30 August 2024 (Venice); 4 October 2024 (Sweden)
- Running time: 360 minutes (Venice cut); 205 minutes (theatrical cut)
- Countries: Sweden; Denmark; Finland
- Languages: Swedish; English; Hebrew; Arabic

Israel Palestine on Swedish TV 1958-1989 (Swedish: Israel Palestina på svensk tv 1958–1989) is a 2024 documentary film which explores the history of the Israel-Palestine conflict through its coverage by SVT, Sweden's national television service. It was written and directed by Göran Hugo Olsson. Some of the footage, such as interviews with Abba Eban, had not been shown since its first broadcast.

The film premiered at the 2024 Venice Film Festival.

== Reception ==
Helena Lindblad wrote in Dagens Nyheter that the film, despite its "dry" title and 3.5 hour runtime, was "relentlessly interesting."
