= Sanna Sundqvist =

Swedish actress (born 1983)

- Born: 1983 (age 42–43); Gothenburg, Sweden
- Education: Stockholm Academy of Dramatic Arts
- Occupation: Actress
- Partner: Fredrik Sols
- Children: 2

Sanna Sundqvist (born 1983) is a Swedish actress known for her roles on stage and screen. She has twice been nominated for a Guldbagge Award for Best Actress in a Leading Role, for Call Mom! (2019) and Thank You, I'm Sorry (2023).

== Early life and education ==
She was born in 1983 in Gothenburg. She was raised in Härnösand. She has six younger siblings. She left her hometown as a teenager to pursue an acting career in Stockholm, although initially also considered pursuing ballet. She graduated from the Stockholm Academy of Dramatic Arts in 2010.

== Career ==
She was offered a permanent position in the ensemble of the Royal Dramatic Theatre in 2010. Her first performance there was in a production of The Miser alongside Gösta Ekman and Johan Rabaeus. She made her on-screen debut in Don't Ever Wipe Tears Without Gloves (2012). The following year, she appeared in a Royal Dramatic Theatre production of The Children's Hour. Her portrayal of Mary was praised by Jenny Aschenbrenner in Aftonbladet. In 2017, she and Emma Broomé played the lead roles of sisters Dina and Dorinda, respectively, in a stage production of Eric Linklater's The Wind on the Moon.

She was nominated for a Guldbagge Award for Best Actress in a Leading Role for her performance as Niki in Call Mom! (2019). She had a supporting role in Sune – Uppdrag midsommar (2021). She had a leading role in the 2023 Netflix original Thank You, I'm Sorry, which earned her another Guldbagge Best Actress nomination. The same year, she appeared in the Netflix series Tore. In April 2024, she was in the Viaplay drama series All and Eva. Then in the summer, she was a host for the Swedish radio programme Sommar. Later that year, she played Larsson in a production of Kristina Lugn's Titta en älg at the Royal Dramatic Theatre. In 2025, it was announced that she would be joining the cast of Ruben Östlund's upcoming film The Entertainment System Is Down.

== Personal life ==
She and her partner Fredrik Sols have two sons, including one with Down syndrome. Sundqvist attended Sweden's first Down syndrome festival in 2025 at the Maximteatern.

== Acting credits ==
=== Film ===
Year	Title	Role	Notes	Ref.
2019	Call Mom!	Niki		
2021	Sune – Uppdrag midsommar			
2023	Thank You, I'm Sorry	Sara		
TBA	The Entertainment System Is Down	TBA	Post-production	

=== Television ===
Year	Title	Role	Notes	Ref.
2012	Don't Ever Wipe Tears Without Gloves			
2018	Sthlm Requiem			
2023	Tore	Linn		
2024	All and Eva	Josefine		

=== Theatre ===
Year	Title	Role	Venue	Notes	Ref.
2013	The Children's Hour	Mary	Royal Dramatic Theatre	Small stage	
2015	Götgatan	Arpi	Royal Dramatic Theatre	Målarsalen stage	
2017	Det blåser på månen	Dina	Royal Dramatic Theatre	Elverket stage	
2023	Pappas födelsedag	Isabel	Royal Dramatic Theatre	Small stage	
2024	Titta en älg	Larsson	Royal Dramatic Theatre	Large stage	
