= Concerning Violence =

2014 documentary film directed by Göran Olsson

- Sundance film poster
- Directed by: Göran Hugo Olsson
- Written by: Göran Hugo Olsson
- Based on: The Wretched of the Earth by Frantz Fanon
- Produced by: Tobias Janson; Annika Rogell
- Narrated by: Swedish release: Kati Outinen; English release: Lauryn Hill
- Cinematography: Lis Asklund; Bo Bjelfvenstam; Ingrid Dahlberg; Lars Hjelm; Roland Hjelte; Stig Holmqvist; Per Källberg; Lennart Malmer; Ingela Romare; Leyla Assaf Tengroth
- Edited by: Göran Olsson; Michael Aaglund; Dino Jonsäter; Sophie Vukovic
- Production companies: Final Cut for Real; Helsinki Filmi Oy
- Distributed by: Films Boutique
- Release dates: 17 January 2014 (Sundance); 15 August 2014 (Sweden); 5 December 2014 (US)
- Running time: 89 minutes
- Countries: Sweden; Finland; Denmark; United States
- Languages: English; Swedish; French; Portuguese

Concerning Violence is a 2014 documentary film written and directed by Göran Hugo Olsson. It is based on Frantz Fanon's essay, "Concerning Violence", from his 1961 book The Wretched of the Earth. American singer and actress Lauryn Hill served as the narrator in the English-language release of the film, while Finnish actress Kati Outinen provides narration for the original Swedish release.

The film is an international co-production between Sweden, Finland, Denmark, and the United States.

== Synopsis ==
The film narrates the events of African nationalist and independence movements in the 1960s and 1970s which challenged colonial and white minority rule.

== Release ==
The film premiered in-competition in the World Cinema Documentary Competition at 2014 Sundance Film Festival on 17 January 2014, after being pitched at the 2012 MeetMarket at Sheffield Doc/Fest.

In May 2013, Films Boutique acquired the worldwide distribution rights to the film. The film also screened at 64th Berlin International Film Festival in Panorama Dokumente section, in February 2014. It won a prize at the festival. The film also premiered in competition at 2014 Göteborg International Film Festival on 30 January 2014.

It had a theatrical release in Sweden on 15 August 2014. It was released in the UK on 28 November 2014 and in the United States on 5 December 2014.

== Reception ==
Concerning Violence received positive reviews upon its premiere at the 2014 Sundance Film Festival. Review aggregator Rotten Tomatoes gives the film a 90% rating based on reviews from 31 critics, with an average score of 7.5/10. On Metacritic, which assigns a weighted mean rating out of 100 reviews from film critics, the film holds an average score of 86, based on 5 reviews, indicating a 'Universal acclaim' response.

Kevin Jagernauth of Indiewire praised the film and said that "Concerning Violence suggests that the lesson has yet to be learned, and it's only a matter a time until history repeats itself again, and action is taken." Joshua Rothkopf of Time Out gave the film four stars out of five and said that "A pulsing, echoing trumpet blast-repeated throughout-and some in-your-face political carnage identify Concerning Violence for what it is: a prickly, passionate call to arms." Boyd van Hoeij in his review for The Hollywood Reporter called the film "A tough and cerebral but finally illuminating documentary about the decolonization of Africa." Dan Schindel of Movie Mezzanine gave the film a positive review and said that "Concerning Violence is one of the best documentaries to hit this year's Sundance. It also acts as an excellent companion piece to We Come As Friends, another great doc about imperialism in Africa that's been playing the fest. It stands alone both as a work of history, sociology, psychology, and philosophy" and adds that the film is "A poetic, thought-provoking visual essay."

== Accolades ==
Year	Award	Category	Recipient	Result
2014	Sundance Film Festival	World Cinema Grand Jury Prize: Documentary	Göran Olsson	Nominated
2014	64th Berlin International Film Festival	Cinema Fairbindet prize	Göran Olsson	Won
2014	Göteborg International Film Festival	Dragon Award Best Nordic Documentary	Göran Olsson	Won
2014	Hong Kong International Film Festival	Golden Firebird Award	Göran Olsson	Nominated
2014	Jihlava International Documentary Film Festival	Best World Documentary	Göran Olsson	Nominated
2014	Munich International Documentary Festival	Viktor Award	Göran Olsson	Nominated
2014	Oslo Films from the South Festival	Best Documentary Feature	Göran Olsson	Won
2014	Sheffield International Documentary Festival	Special Jury Award	Göran Olsson	Nominated

== See also ==
- Africa Addio, a 1966 mondo documentary film.
- African Independence, a 2013 documentary film about the African independence movements.
