= Tore (TV series) =

Swedish drama television series

- Promotional poster
- Genre: Tragicomedy; Drama
- Created by: William Spetz
- Written by: William Spetz
- Directed by: Erika Calmeyer
- Starring: William Spetz; Hannes Fohlin; Peter Haber; Sanna Sundqvist
- Composer: Per Störby Jutbring
- Country of origin: Sweden
- Original language: Swedish
- No. of seasons: 1
- No. of episodes: 6

Production
- Executive producer: Ulf Synnerholm
- Producer: Anna-Klara Carlsten
- Cinematography: Karl Erik Brøndbo
- Running time: 30–35 minutes

Original release
- Network: Netflix
- Release: 12 August 2023

Tore is a Swedish tragicomedy drama television series created by and starring William Spetz. It was released in Sweden on 12 August 2023 before being released internationally on Netflix on 27 October 2023.

== Premise ==
An insecure, aimless, and naive 27-year-old loses his father in an accident and does everything in his power to avoid his grief. He soon slips into the adult world of sex, drugs, and alcohol, much to the concern of his family and friends.

== Cast ==
- William Spetz as Tore
- Hannes Fohlin as Erik
- Peter Haber as Bosse, Tore's father
- Sanna Sundqvist as Linn
- Carlos Romero Cruz as Shady Meat, a drag queen
- Per Svensson as Per
- Victor Iván as Viggo
- Karin Bertling as Heidi
- Lotta Tejle as Ulla
- Doreen Ndagire as Lo

== Episodes ==
No.	Title	Duration	Original release date
1	"Something New Will Do You Good" (Det blir bra med något nytt)	31 min	12 August 2023
2	"If They Wear Watches, They're Straight" (Har dom klocka är dom straighta)	30 min	12 August 2023
3	"To Speak or to Die"	35 min	12 August 2023
4	"With Death as Your Colleague" (Med Döden som kollega)	30 min	12 August 2023
5	"Erik"	31 min	12 August 2023
6	"Home" (Hjem)	32 min	12 August 2023

== Production ==
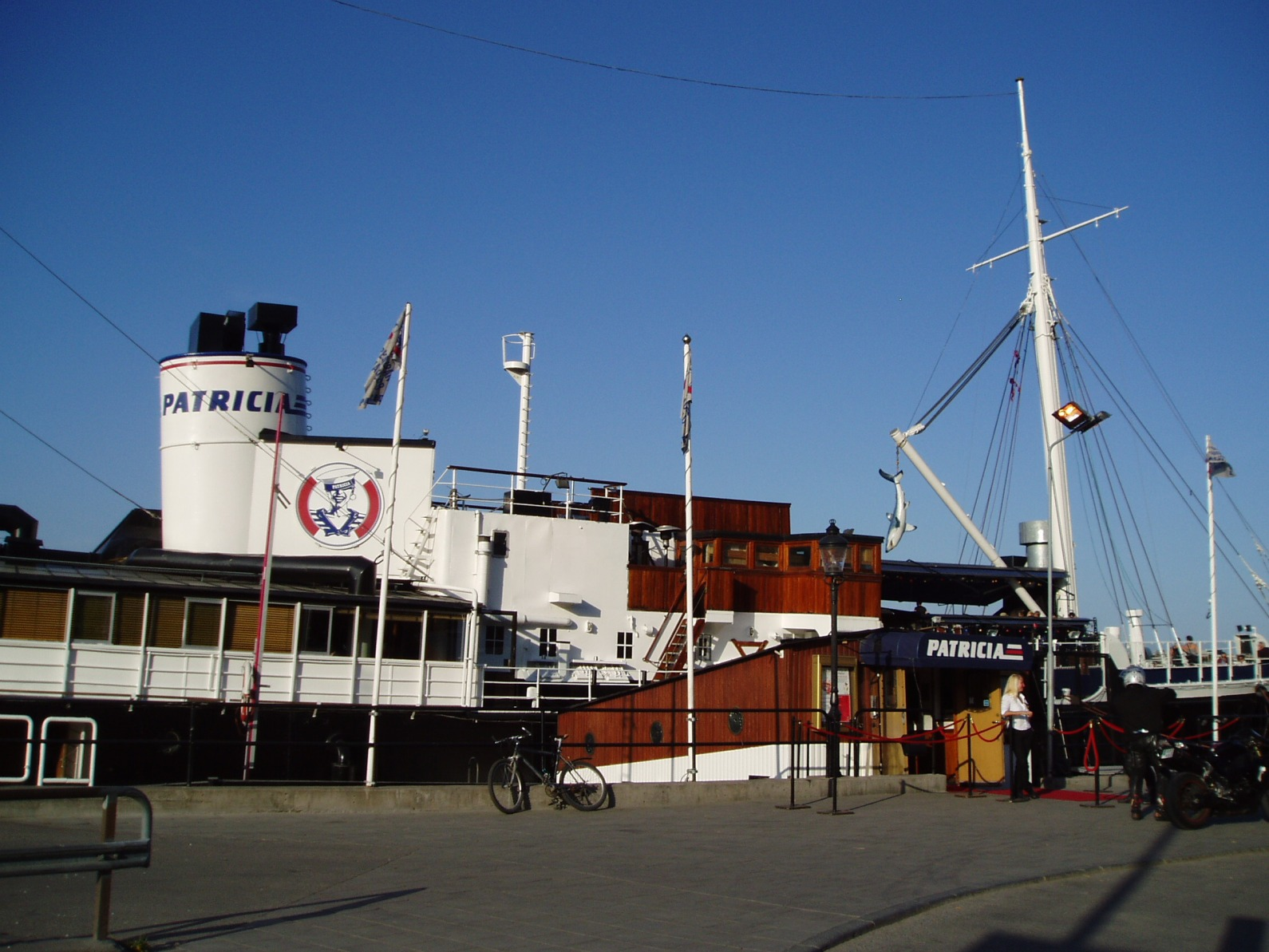
Patricia, a nightclub in Stockholm that features in the series

Creator William Spetz was inspired to write the series after facing rejection on another project and feeling "creatively heartbroken."

The series was both set and shot in Stockholm, with principal photography beginning in December 2022. Spetz, despite having grown up in Umeå, knew of the Patricia nightclub in Stockholm and was inspired to set Tore's first foray into LGBT spaces there.

== Reception ==
=== Critical response ===
Reviewing the first episode of the series, Joel Keller of Decider wrote that Spetz "does a good job of not only playing a guy who seems a bit sheltered and is OK with that, but of someone who tries his best to tamp down his grief over his father by being as reckless as he can be."

Eric Diedrichs of Filmtopp gave the first episode four stars, commending Spetz on his "sharp combination of humor, blackness and surprises." Tor Aavatsmark of Ljud & Bild gave the series three "completely average" stars, calling it "repetitive" and full of "clichés and stereotypes."

=== Accolades ===
Year	Award	Category	Result	Ref.
2024	GLAAD Media Award	Outstanding New TV Series	Nominated	
