= Call Mom! =

2019 Swedish comedy film by Lisa Aschan

- Promotional poster
- Swedish: Ring mamma!
- Directed by: Lisa Aschan
- Written by: Lisa Aschan
- Starring: Sanna Sundqvist; Nina Gunke; Alexander Karim; Jonatan Rodriguez; Evin Ahmad
- Release date: 20 November 2019
- Running time: 100 minutes
- Country: Sweden
- Language: Swedish

Call Mom! (Swedish: Ring mamma!) is a 2019 Swedish comedy film written and directed by Lisa Aschan.

== Plot ==
Nina's 35th birthday leads her to reconsider the current state of her complicated life. She has a thorny relationship with her mother, a friends with benefits arrangement with her married colleague, and a best friend who wants help finding semen for a DIY artificial insemination.

== Cast ==
- Sanna Sundqvist as Niki
- Nina Gunke as Sofia: Niki's mother
- Alexander Karim as Alex
- Jonatan Rodriguez as Rodrigo
- Evin Ahmad as Maggie: Niki's best friend
- Eric Ericson as Tomas
- Cecilia Forss
- Björn Gustafsson

== Release ==
The film premiered on 22 November 2019.

== Reception ==
Call Mom! received 3/5 stars from Helena Lindblad in Dagens Nyehter. In a mixed-to-positive review for Kulturnyheterna, critic Fredrik Sahlin praised Sanna Sundqvist's comedic leading performance but felt the film occasionally leaned too far into formulaic genre tropes. Both Lindblad and Sahlin noted similarities to Bridget Jones Diary. Jens Peterson cited a scene involving Cecilia Forss and Björn Gustafsson as the film's funniest.

Sundqvist and Evin Ahmad were both nominated for Guldbagge Awards for their performances. Aschan was nominated for the Guldbagge Award for Best Screenplay.
