= Bitch Hug =

- Film poster
- Swedish: Bitchkram
- Directed by: Andreas Öhman
- Starring: Linda Molin; Fanny Ketter
- Release date: 19 October 2012 (Sweden)
- Running time: 101 minutes
- Country: Sweden
- Language: Swedish

Bitch Hug (Swedish: Bitchkram) is a 2012 Swedish drama film directed by Andreas Öhman. It stars Linda Molin as Kristin, and Fanny Ketter as Andrea, as the main characters. The movie was filmed in the Sundsvall fjord area in 2011.

== Plot ==
Kristin is an 18-year-old girl who writes for her school newspaper. She has a bucket list of a thousand things she wishes to do before she dies. Visiting New York City is the first on the list. Kristin has a rocky relationship with her sister Linn, who tells Kristin that Kristin is pathetic with no talent.

After graduating gymnasium, Kristin is given an assignment to report on her upcoming trip to New York. The night prior the flight, she attended a graduation party with her schoolmates, where she met Gustav. They then went to Gustav's house in the woods to have sex, but were interrupted when Gustav's little brother, Neo, asked to be tucked in. With the night ruined, Kristin explores the house, where she meets Gustav's sister Andrea, a 16-year old coming back from her nightly run through the woods. Kristin and Andrea then get to chatting, while lying back and drinking strong alcohol. Andrea convinces Kristin to watch "half a movie", since Kristin must go to New York in two hours. Nonetheless, they both sleep in during the entire movie, and Gustav unwittingly shut off Kristin's alarm on her phone. Panicked, she rushed to the airport to no avail, and comes back to Andrea morose, blaming her for the delay. Kristin tries to reschedule her ticket, but the airline could only book her on another flight if another passenger cancels their reservations.

Kristin initially goes back home, but realizing that all her acquaintances believe she's on her way to New York, she asks Andrea if she could hide in her house, and avoid immense humiliation. During the house tour, finding a room for Kristin to stay in, Kristin jokes to Andrea next to the swimming pool that Andrea and Gustav, and their parents, had sex in the pool. In retaliation, Andrea pushed Kristin in the pool, where Kristin reveals her inability to swim. Andrea lets Kristin stay in the attic, despite a hole in the roof and a vacant master bedroom. Andrea explains that their parents are away on a trip. In the meanwhile, under pressure from the newspaper to publish her trip's experiences, she must fake her trip to New York with Andrea's help. During Kristin's stay in the house, they befriend each other.

During the "trip", Kristin sets out with Andrea and Gustav to accomplish some of the 1000 activities on her list. Kristin and Andrea stay out for too long, so Gustav had to skip his shift at work to care for their little brother. After Kristin complained that their parents are incompetent for leaving them alone for themselves, Gustav explains that their parents are dead. The next night, when Andrea believed everyone was asleep, she ran through her usual route to a cliff overlooking the city and the fjord. Unbeknownst to her until the cliff, Kristin chased Andrea and asked her to tell her everything so she'd share her own secrets. Andrea confesses that she's an orphan and that she quit school due to the unwanted attention, disclosing that no one really knows a person's true feelings but one's self.

When Gustav hosts a midsummer party with his friends at his place, Kristin and Andrea hide in the attic and have a little party for themselves. However, Linn is present in the party, and bumps into Andrea when Andrea had to visit the kitchen for a while. Andrea runs up to the attic to Kristin, fearing Linn may have recognized her from a video chat as the French exchange student Kristin is "staying with" in New York. They escape the house through the hole in the roof, and hang out by the fjord. When Andrea and Kristin hear the party approaching the pier they're sitting on, Kristin realizes she has nowhere to hide, and tries to swim away through the fjord. Having only had a few swimming lessons with Andrea, she drowns but is swiftly rescued by Andrea.

Word spreads that the entire trip to New York was a hoax, with rumors spreading that she had to live off the earth and that she attempted suicide by drowning after being caught. The editor-in-chief of the newspaper Kristin was writing for forgives the incident, telling her that the controversy helped them sell much more copies, and that he wants Kristin to write about her lie, and to write again about a real trip. He then gives her a flight ticket to New York. During this entire time, Andrea's and Kristin's friendship is strained.

Kristin's sister Linn held a surprise welcome home/farewell party for her after she was released from hospital, along with her friends being at the party too. Despite not being in the mood for a party, she is coerced by her friends to stay. Andrea visits the party, expecting to get back on good terms with Kristin, but Kristin reverts to her former apathetic self before meeting Andrea. In grief, Andrea and Kristin get extremely drunk, and Andrea pulls Kristin's ex-boyfriend into the bathroom to have sex with him. Upon realizing the situation, Andrea pushes him off her, and runs out of the party. Kristin chases her and attempts to explain her behavior, and bursts out that their experience wasn't real. Andrea takes this to mean that their relationship meant nothing to Kristin. Devastated, Kristin returns to the party crying in demoralization, much to Linn's disappointment, and Andrea is picked up by Gustav while she states that she wishes to resume her education and begs for all aid from him as he is the sole person in her life. Gustav confirms and commiserates Andrea.

In an attempt to mend their relationship, Kristin buys a window to cover the hole on the roof of the attic, and hands Andrea her diary. They get back on friendly terms. Kristin explains that she doesn't wish to visit New York anymore, since it doesn't feel sincere and real anymore, having had the experience with Andrea already. Despite this, Andrea convinces Kristin to fly anyway.

The next day, Kristin and Andrea hug goodbye and she boards the flight to New York, Andrea watches the plane take off and looks back to not see Kristin coming up the escalator again. When she takes the taxi back to her house, the driver asks Andrea if she had a pleasant journey, to which Andrea replies "Very".

== Cast ==
- Linda Molin - Kristin, the movie's main protagonist.
- Fanny Ketter - Andrea, the peculiar girl Kristin befriends, who has a tragic story.
- Mathilda von Essen - Linn, Kristin's manipulative and competitive sister.
- Adam Lundgren - Gustav, Andrea's older brother.
- Antoni Norén Almén - Arthur, Kristin's lewd and awkward boyfriend, who is believed to love her but instead has in fact a libido on her.
- Fabian Fourén - Neo, Gustav and Andrea's naive little brother.
