= Nina Gunke =

Swedish actress (born 1955)

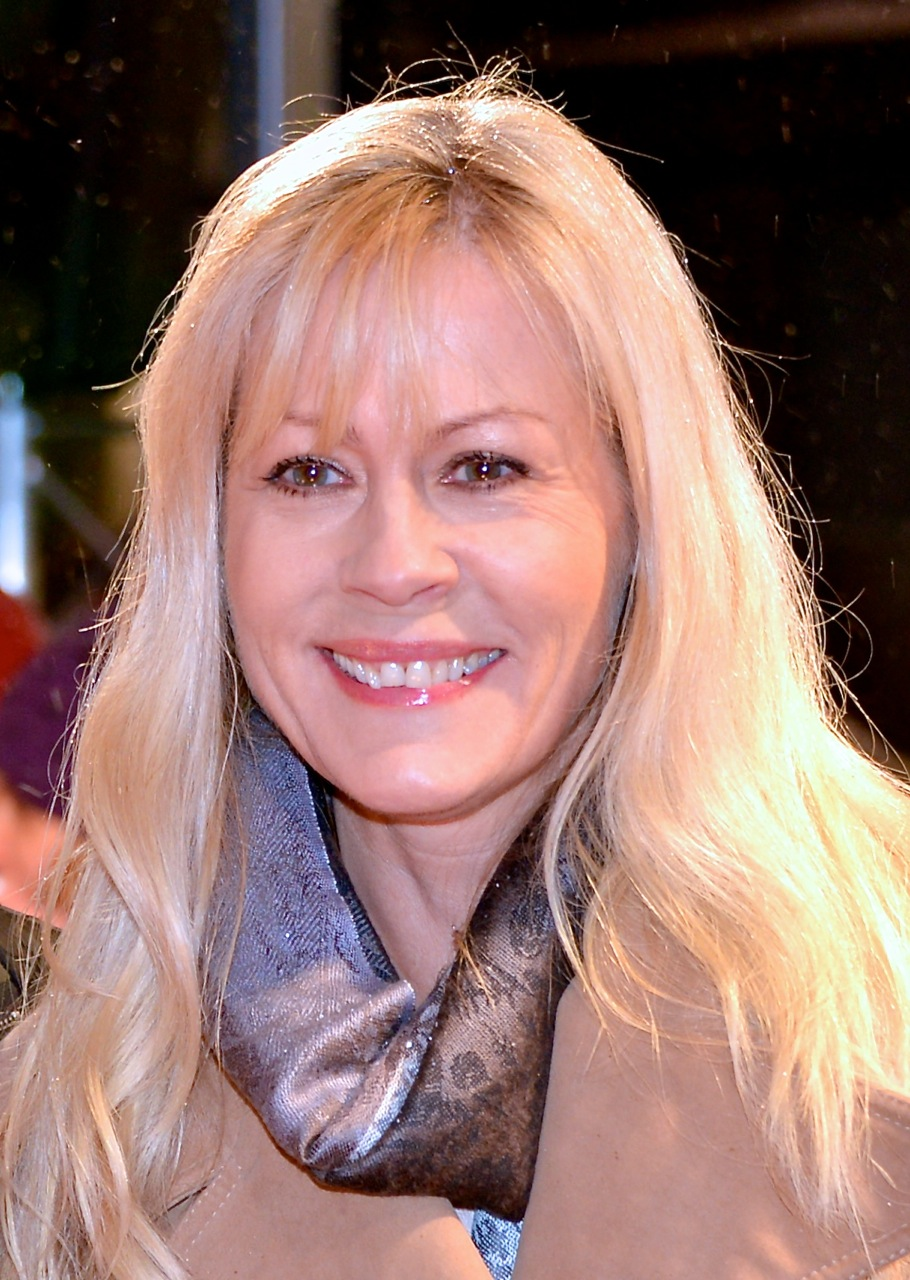
- Gunke in 2012.
- Born: Anna Katarina Gunke; 12 July 1955 (age 70); Lidingö, Sweden
- Occupation: Actress
- Years active: 1975–present
- Spouse(s): Göran Stangertz (m. 1980–1984) Samuel Holgersson
- Children: 2

Nina Gunke (born 12 July 1955) is a Swedish actress. She has appeared in more than 40 films and television shows since 1975.

She was born on 12 July 1955.

She played Sofia in Call Mom! (2019).

On 26 December 2021, she announced on TV4 News that she is suffering from Alzheimer's disease.

== Selected filmography ==
- Hello Baby (1976)
- The Man from Majorca (1984)
- Teenage Mutant Ninja Turtles (1990, as April O'Neil, Irma, Zach and Krang)
- The Great Day on the Beach (1991)
- Lakki (1992)
- Jungle Jack (1993)
- All Things Fair (1995)
- Jungledyret Hugo 2 - den store filmhelt (1996)
- In Bed with Santa (1999)
- Call Mom! (2019)
