= Eric Ericson (actor) =

Swedish actor

Eric Gunnar Ericson (born 21 November 1974 in Sollentuna, Sweden) is a Swedish actor, educated at Gothenburg Theatre Academy 1995–98. He has been engaged at Helsingborg City Theatre 1997 & 1999, Folkteatern in Gothenburg 1999 and at Angereds Teater 2000–01.

He appeared in Call Mom! (2019).

== Selected filmography ==
- 2019 – Call Mom!
- 2010 – Fyra år till
- 2010 – Svaleskär (TV)
- 2009 – Göta kanal 3: Kanalkungens hemlighet
- 2007 – Gynekologen i Askim (TV)
- 2005 – Storm
- 2005 – Störst av allt
- 2005 – Som man bäddar
- 2004 – Hotet
- 2003 – De drabbade (TV)
- 2002 – Suxxess
- 2002 – Dieselråttor och sjömansmöss (TV)
- 2001 – Tsatsiki – vänner för alltid
- 2001 – Fru Marianne (TV)
- 1999 – Sjätte dagen (TV)
- 1996 – Vinterviken
- 1995 – Svarta skallar och vita nätter (TV)
- 1992 – Maskeraden (TV)
- 1990 – Storstad (TV series)
