= The Entertainment System Is Down =

Upcoming film by Ruben Östlund

- Directed by: Ruben Östlund
- Written by: Ruben Östlund
- Produced by: Erik Hemmendorff; Philippe Bober
- Starring: Keanu Reeves; Kirsten Dunst; Daniel Brühl; Samantha Morton; Nicholas Braun; Julie Delpy; Tobias Menzies; Vincent Lindon
- Cinematography: Fredrik Wenzel
- Production companies: Plattform Produktion; Parisienne de Production; Essential Films
- Distributed by: SF Studios (Sweden); Alamode Film Wild Bunch (Germany); Memento Distribution (France)
- Countries: Sweden; Germany; France
- Language: English

The Entertainment System Is Down is an upcoming satirical black comedy film written and directed by Ruben Östlund, and starring Keanu Reeves, Kirsten Dunst, Daniel Brühl, and Samantha Morton.

== Premise ==
The passengers of a lengthy flight contend with their boredom as the plane's entertainment system is broken.

== Cast ==
- Keanu Reeves
- Kirsten Dunst
- Daniel Brühl
- Samantha Morton
- Nicholas Braun
- Tobias Menzies
- Vincent Lindon
- Connor Swindells
- Daniel Webber
- Wayne Blair
- Daniel Wyllie
- Lindsay Duncan
- Allan Corduner
- Ben Ashenden
- Sofia Tjelta Sydness
- Erin Ainsworth
- Myles Kamwendo
- Sanna Sundqvist
- Elle Piper
- Tea Stjärne
- Benjamin Ingrosso
- Julie Delpy

== Production ==
The Entertainment System Is Down was announced by director Ruben Östlund in May 2022, after his film Triangle of Sadness premiered at the 75th Cannes Film Festival that month. The film was inspired by Aldous Huxley's dystopian novel Brave New World.

In December 2023, Östlund stated that he planned to begin filming in early 2025. In April 2024, Keanu Reeves entered negotiations to star. He was confirmed for the film the following month, with Kirsten Dunst and Daniel Brühl added to the cast. It was also revealed that Östlund purchased a retired Boeing 747 to utilize for filming over 70 days. That same month, A24 won a highly competitive bid for the film's US distribution rights at the Marché du Film in an eight-figure deal. Nicholas Braun, Samantha Morton, Joel Edgerton, and Vincent Lindon joined the cast the following month. In January 2025, Tobias Menzies was added to the cast, replacing Edgerton in his role, who had to part ways with the film due to scheduling conflicts. In March, Julie Delpy was cast.

Production occurred in Budapest, Hungary from January to May 2025, resulting in a 75-day shoot. Connor Swindells, Daniel Webber, Wayne Blair, Daniel Wyllie, Lindsay Duncan, Allan Corduner, Sofia Tjelta Sydness, Erin Ainsworth, Myles Kamwendo, Sanna Sundqvist, Elle Piper, Tea Stjärne, and Benjamin Ingrosso joined the cast by January 28. In May 2026, Östlund revealed that he was going to shoot an additional sequence involving Braun in Amsterdam.
