= Linda Molin (actress) =

Swedish actress

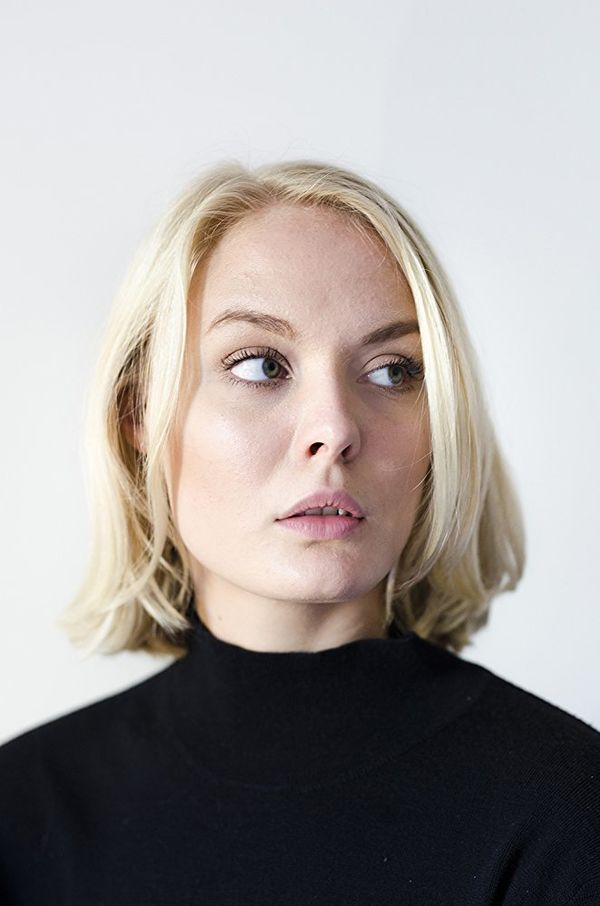
- Born: 24 July 1992 (age 33); Gothenburg, Sweden
- Occupation: Actress
- Years active: 2011-present

Linda Molin (born 24 July 1992) is a Swedish actress. She is best known for her performance as Kristin in Bitch Hug which got her a nomination for the Guldbagge Award for Best Actress in a Leading Role. She also played the co-lead as Cassandra in the 2011 award-winning Swedish movie Apflickorna.

== Filmography ==
Film
Year	Title	Role	Notes
2011	Apflickorna	Cassandra	Won—Dragon Award Best Nordic Film, Göteborg International Film Festival 2011 Won—FIPRESCI Critics Award, Göteborg International Film Festival 2011
2012	Bitch Hug	Kristin	
