= William Spetz =

Swedish comedian and television personality (born 1996)

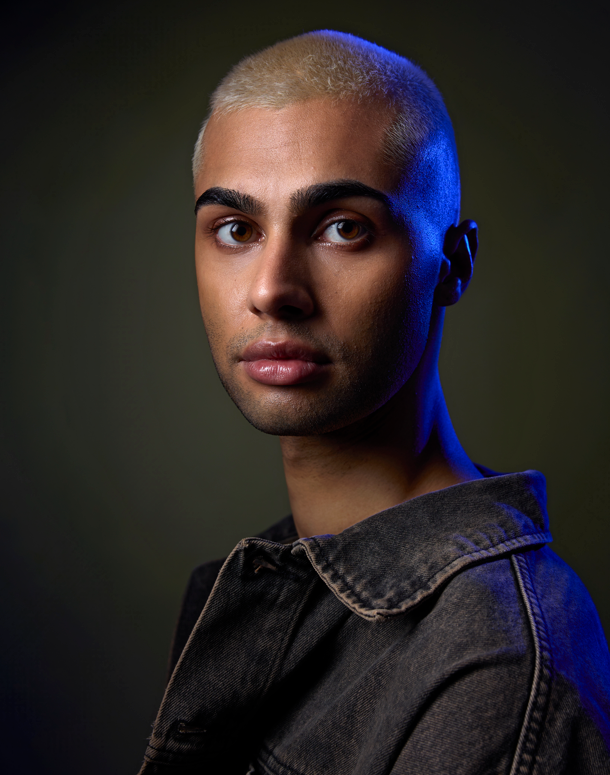
- Spetz in 2023
- Born: Frans Erik William Markström Spets; 4 April 1996 (age 30); Umeå, Sweden
- Occupations: Actor; comedian; television personality; YouTuber
- Years active: 2009–present

YouTube information
- Channel: lillabloggen
- Years active: 2010–present
- Genre: Comedy
- Subscribers: 243 thousand
- Views: 21.6 million
- Last updated: 19 January 2026

Frans Erik William Markström Spets (born 4 April 1996), known as William Spetz, is a Swedish television personality and actor.

== Early and personal life ==
Spetz was born and raised in Umeå. His mother was born in Pakistan and moved to Sweden as a child, where she met his Swedish father.

He is openly gay.

== Career ==
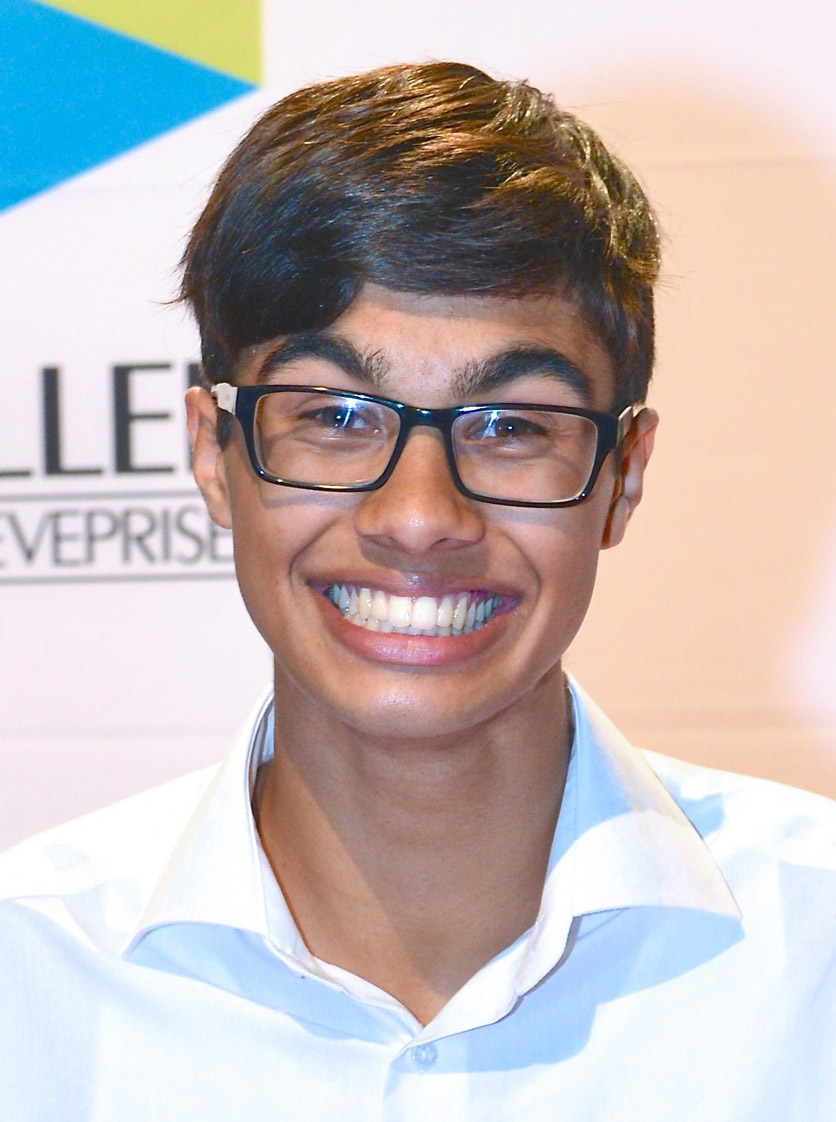
Spetz in 2013

Spetz became known after posting comedic videos on YouTube at the age of 15. He went on to appear in two comedic children's shows Williams lista and Scener ur ett tonårsliv which aired on SVT Play.

Spetz started blogging at the age of 12 on the blog portal Blogspot. Owing to a lack of interest, he asked the paper Västerbottens-Kuriren if he could start a youth blog at their blog portal. In May 2010, Spetz began video blogging at the YouTube channel "Lilla bloggen". In 2014, Spetz was a travelling reporter for Musikhjälpen and travelled to Mozambique. Spetz has also been a panellist at Intresseklubben on SVT.

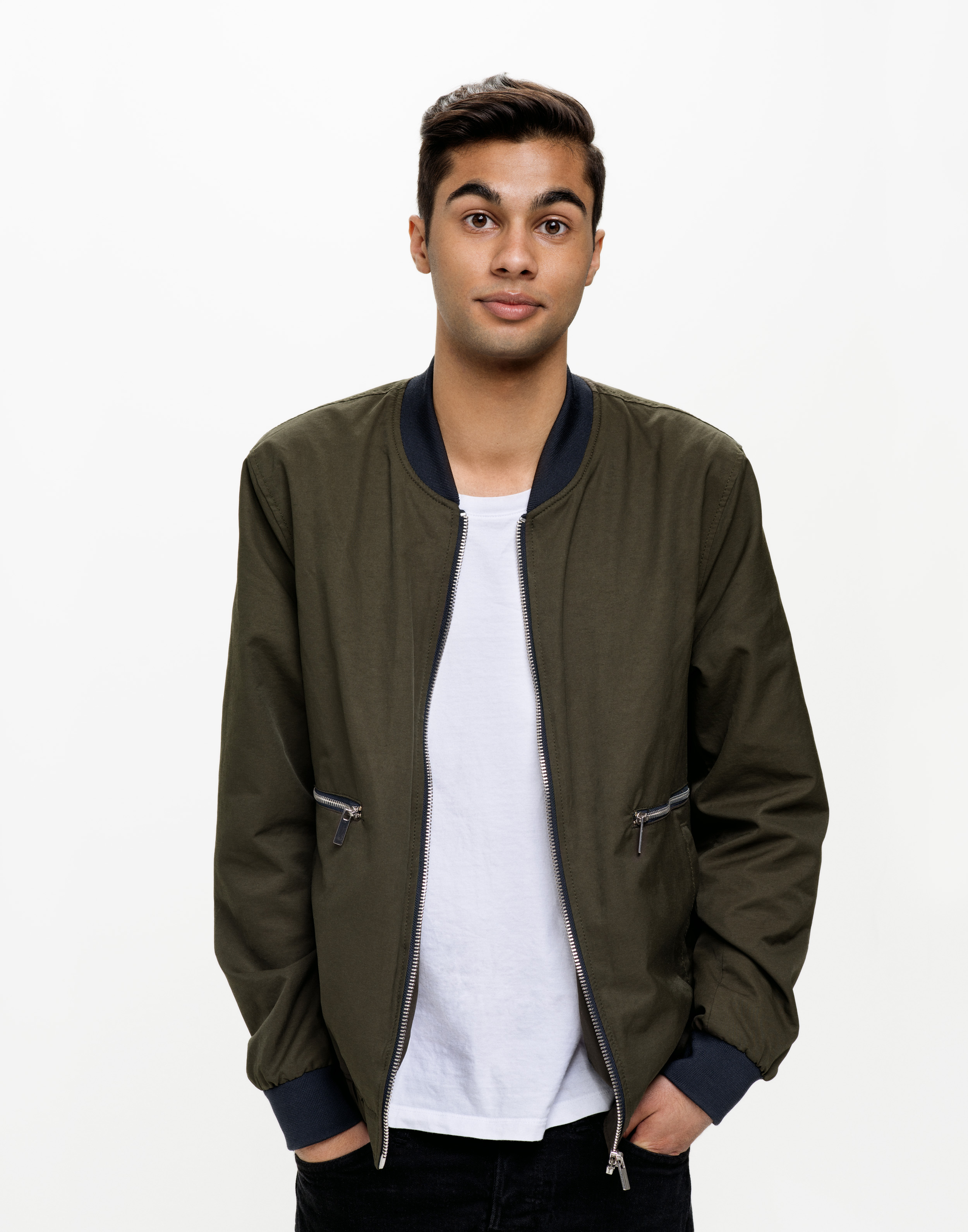
Spetz in 2016

He was one of the co-hosts alongside Gina Dirawi for the final of Melodifestivalen 2016.

In 2016, he wrote and starred in a one-man autobiographical show, Mormor jag vet att du är i himlen, men har du tid en timme? ("Grandma, I know you're up in heaven, but do you have a minute?"), an ode to his deceased grandmother. It was shown on SVT in 2019.

== Filmography ==
- 2019 – Quicksand (Netflix series) as Samir Said
- 2019 – Filip och Mona (SVT series) as Filip
- 2020 – Dag för dag (film) as Simon
- 2023 – Tore (Netflix series) as Tore
