= According to Mary Magdalene =

1997 novel by Marianne Fredriksson

- Cover of the English edition
- Author: Marianne Fredriksson
- Original title: Enligt Maria Magdalena
- Language: Swedish
- Genre: Secret history novel
- Publisher: Wahlström & Widstrand, Hampton Roads Publishing Company (English)
- Publication date: March 1997
- Publication place: Sweden
- Media type: Print (Hardcover & Paperback)
- Pages: 255 pages (Swedish first edition), 320 pages (hardcover edition) & 256 pages (paperback edition)
- ISBN: 1-57174-120-8
- OCLC: 41112711
- Dewey Decimal: 839.73/74 21
- LC Class: PT9876.16.R475 E5413 1999

According to Mary Magdalene (Swedish: Enligt Maria Magdalena, 1997) is a novel by the Swedish novelist Marianne Fredriksson. It attempts to portray the life of the biblical figure of Mary Magdalene as told by herself. The author claims to have based the book on Gnostic manuscripts, such as the Gospel of Mary, that were discovered in recent times. The English version was published 1999.

== Plot introduction ==
The story offers a feminist perspective on the person of Christ and on the beginnings of the Christian Church. Since it presents Jesus as merely a human being and deviates from the orthodox biblical portrayal of the Son of Man, the novel was severely criticised by mainstream Christians.
