= Thank You, I'm Sorry (film) =

2023 Swedish comedy-drama film

- English-language promotional poster
- Swedish: Tack och förlåt
- Directed by: Lisa Aschan
- Written by: Marie Østerbye
- Starring: Sanna Sundqvist; Charlotta Björck
- Distributed by: Netflix
- Release date: 26 December 2023
- Running time: 90 minutes
- Country: Sweden
- Language: Swedish

Thank You, I'm Sorry (Swedish: Tack och förlåt) is a 2023 Swedish comedy-drama film directed by Lisa Aschan and written by Marie Østerbye. It premiered on Netflix on 26 December 2023.

== Plot ==
In an opening flashback, Sara — who is heavily pregnant — learns her husband Daniel wants to go away on a trip, as he feels their relationship is not working. Some time later, she finds Daniel unresponsive; he died in his sleep of a heart condition. The tragedy prompts Sara to re-connect with her sister Linda, who lives a more unstructured and free-spirited life.

== Cast ==
- Sanna Sundqvist as Sara
- Charlotta Björck as Linda
- Ia Langhammer as Helen: Daniel's mother
- Peshang Rad as Jasse
- Ville Virtanen as Timo
- Juan Rodríguez as José

== Release ==
It premiered on Netflix on 26 December 2023.

== Reception ==
The film received a negative review from Nina Morby in Göteborgs-Posten. She characterized the plot as overly cryptic, and also cited problems with unrealistic dialogue and depictions of grief.
