= The Black Power Mixtape 1967–1975 =

- Promotional release poster
- Directed by: Göran Hugo Olsson
- Produced by: Annika Rogell
- Starring: Stokely Carmichael; Martin Luther King Jr.; Eldridge Cleaver; Bobby Seale; Huey P. Newton; Emile de Antonio; Angela Davis
- Edited by: Göran Olsson; Hanna Lejonqvist
- Music by: Corey Smyth
- Release date: February 2011 (Berlin International Film Festival)
- Running time: 100 minutes
- Countries: Sweden; United States
- Language: Swedish

The Black Power Mixtape 1967–1975 is a 2011 Swedish–American documentary film directed by Göran Hugo Olsson, that examines the evolution of the Black Power movement in American society from 1967 to 1975 as viewed through Swedish journalists and filmmakers. It features footage of the movement shot by Swedish journalists in the United States at that time, with appearances by Angela Davis, Bobby Seale, Huey P. Newton, Eldridge Cleaver, and other activists, artists, and leaders central to the movement.

== Summary ==
The documentary features the found footage shot by a group of Swedish journalists (discovered some 30 years later in the cellar of Swedish Television) overlaid with commentaries and interviews from leading contemporary African-American artists, activists, musicians, and scholars. Divided into 9 sections based chronologically on each successive year between 1967 and 1975, the film focuses on several topics and subjects relevant to the Black Power Movement including Opposition to United States involvement in the Vietnam War, the Black Panther Party, COINTELPRO, and the war on drugs. The film documents these events with footage of individuals who were highly important to the movement including but not limited to Angela Davis, Stokely Carmichael, and Huey P. Newton. David Fear of Time Out New York referred to the film as "a time capsule of a turbulent era, essential viewing for anyone concerned with our nation's history—and its present".

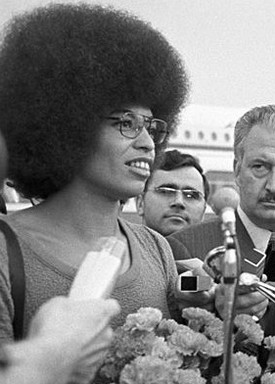
Political activist, academic scholar, and author Angela Davis is featured in the film through both footage and contemporary voice commentary.

The footage includes appearances by Stokely Carmichael, Martin Luther King Jr., Eldridge Cleaver, Bobby Seale, Huey P. Newton, Louis Farrakhan, Emile de Antonio, Richard Nixon, Ingrid Dahlberg and Angela Davis who also provides contemporary voice commentary.

Additional contemporary voice commentaries are provided by Erykah Badu, Ahmir Questlove Thompson, who is also credited with scoring the music for the film along with Om'Mas Keith, Talib Kweli, Harry Belafonte, Kathleen Cleaver, Angela Davis, John Forté, Sonia Sanchez, Bobby Seale, Robin Kelley, Abiodun Oyewole and Melvin Van Peebles. Mark Jenkins of NPR has commented that the prominence of music artists rather than political activists who provide commentary throughout the film is "a sign of how African-American culture has shifted".

== Production ==
The conception of The Black Power Mixtape 1967-1975 is unique in that the 16 mm film footage used was originally shot by Swedish journalists in the 1960s and 1970s for Swedish Television, but the editing and release of the film did not take place for more than 3 decades after the era when it was discovered by director Göran Olsson. The setting of the footage featured in the documentary spans across the US and Europe and includes shots in Harlem, Oakland, and Brooklyn. Although Swedish journalists conducted the interviews, the film was co-produced by Americans Joslyn Barnes and actor Danny Glover through their independent film production company, Louverture Films. The Black Power Mixtape 1967-1975 was screened at both the 2011 Sundance Film Festival and the 61st Berlin International Film Festival. The rights of the documentary were later acquired by Sundance Selects, a sister label to IFC Films. The documentary was also featured on a February 2012 episode of PBS's Independent Lens.

== Reception ==
=== Critical reception ===
On review aggregator Rotten Tomatoes, the film holds an approval rating of 92% based on 53 reviews, with an average rating of 7.1/10. On Metacritic, the film has a weighted average score of 73 out of 100, based on 15 critics, indicating "generally favorable reviews".

=== Accolades ===
The documentary was nominated for and won and number of awards throughout 2011-2012.

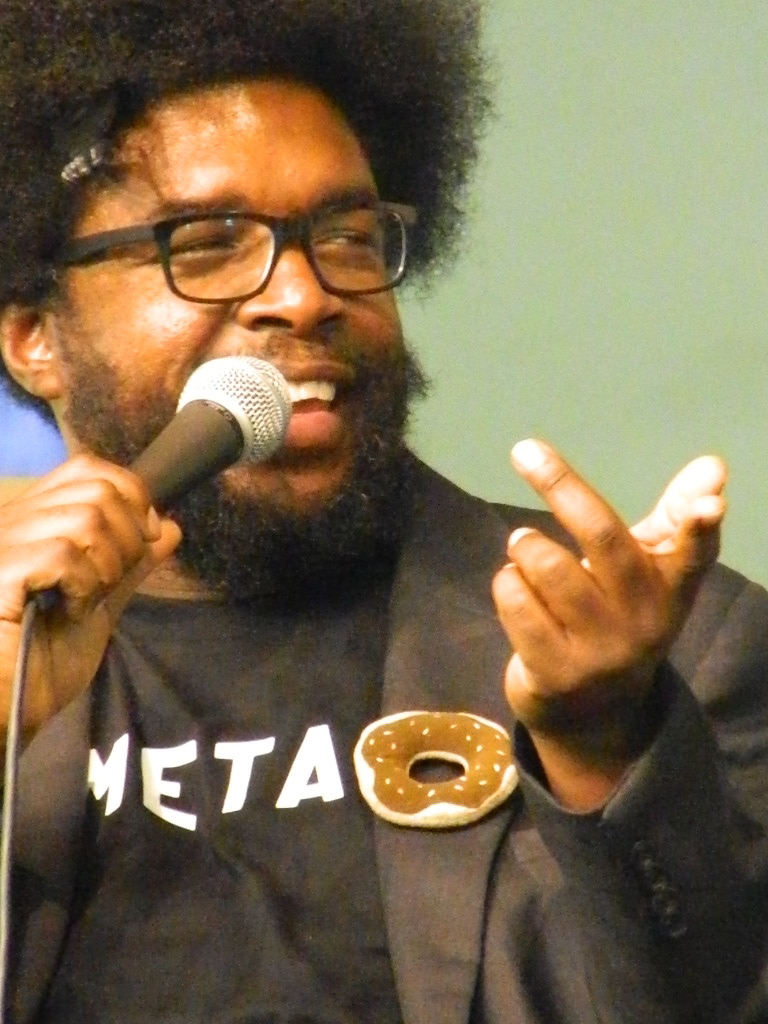
Questlove did voice commentary for the film and won the Guldbagge Award for Best Music with Om'Mas Keith.

List of awards and nominations
Award	Category	Year	Nominated work	Result	Ref.
African-American Film Critics Association	Best Documentary	2011	The Black Power Mixtape 1967–1975	Won	
Black Reel Awards	Best Documentary	2012	Göran Olsson	Nominated	
Cinema Eye Honors	Cinema Eye Audience Choice Prize	2012	Göran Olsson	Nominated	
Cinema Eye Honors	Outstanding Achievement in Editing	2012	Hanna Lejonqvist & Göran Olsson	Nominated	
Copenhagen International Documentary Festival	Nordic Dox Award	2011	Göran Olsson	Nominated	
Guldbagge Awards	Best Editing	2011	Hanna Lejonqvist & Göran Olsson	Won	
Guldbagge Awards	Best Original Score	2011	Ahmir "Questlove" Thompson & Om'Mas Keith	Won	
Guldbagge Awards	Best Documentary Feature	2011	Göran Olsson	Nominated	
London Film Festival	Grierson Award	2011	Göran Olsson	Nominated	
Miami Film Festival	Main Jury Prize; Knight Dox Competition	2011	Göran Olsson	Nominated	
Sundance Film Festival	Editing Award; World Cinema-Documentary	2011	Hanna Lejonqvist & Göran Olsson	Won	
Sundance Film Festival	Grand Jury Prize; World Cinema-Documentary	2011	Göran Olsson	Nominated	

== Historical context ==
Some of the criticism that the documentary has received has been directed toward its limited coverage of everything that the Black Power movement encapsulated. Joe Williams of the St. Louis Post-Dispatch opined that the "'Black Power Mixtape, 1967-1975' is a potent time capsule, but without a skeleton of facts and figures, it's a deficient history lesson". NPR acknowledged that the film "includes plenty of interest, but it would be stronger if the filmmakers had dug a little deeper into the footage from 1967 to 1972 and skipped the final years altogether". In its review for the film, The New York Times commented, "As its title suggests, 'The Black Power Mixtape' is not a comprehensive history". However, this outlook on the subject matter of the film is not universal. Diane Archer of Film Comment wrote that The Black Power Mixtape is "a chronological, musically structured collage tracing the arc of the Black Power movement from its inception during the civil rights era through its dissolution as drugs began to erode black communities in the Seventies, created with rarely seen footage culled from the archives of Swedish Television". Given this commentary, it is apparent that two of the historical events that the film does a particularly fine job of covering is that of the Civil Rights Movement and the effects of the war on drugs. Olsson frames these themes to be highly relevant to the Black Power movement throughout the documentary.

=== Civil Rights Movement ===
The most telling aspect of the film which reveals the strong thematic presence of the Civil Rights Movement from the beginning is its early depiction of Martin Luther King Jr. The film begins its documentation in 1967 which is at the heels of the Civil Rights Movement and rise of the Black Power movement. Featured in the 1967 recap within the film, Stokely Carmichael is seen offering his thoughts on Dr. King in a vintage interview. In reflecting, Carmichael claims that King is "A great man full of compassion. He is full of mercy and he is very patient. He is a man who can accept the uncivilized behavior of white Americans and their unceasing taunts and still have in his heart forgiveness. Unfortunately, I am from a younger generation. I'm not as patient as Dr. King, nor am I as merciful as Dr. King". In documenting both the Civil Rights Movement and the Black Power Movement, Olsson portrays the tension present as the two movement attempted to coexist despite the differing goals and tactics of the movements.

In documenting the rift between King and Carmichael, the film portrays the tension between the two distinct movements. Carmichael, who popularized the term "Black Power", used the Black Power movement to promote Black nationalism and Self-determination. King, as the leader of the Civil Rights Movement, promoted political cooperation and nonviolence, and the 1967 and 1968 recaps within the film offer a display, explanation, and illustration of why these movements were at odds with each other. In the 1968 section of the film specifically, the film documents the intersections of the two movements when Dr. King is shown speaking out against the Vietnam War and Income inequality, political movements more closely associated with the Black Power movement. The film goes as far to suggest that his assassination was heeded by an ideological movement towards Black Power, a movement he initially condemned.

While the Black Power movement is often characterized as violent, the film challenges conventions in its effort to portray the movement in a more positive light. This is accomplished in the way in which the film humanizes the leaders of the Black Power movement. In his review of the film, A.O. Scott of The New York Times commented on the film's portrayal of Stokely Carmichael, writing "Carmichael, who later moved to Guinea and took the name Kwame Ture, is remembered for the militancy of his views and his confrontational, often slashingly witty speeches, but the Swedish cameras captured another side of him. In the most touching and arresting scene in 'Mixtape,' he interviews his mother, Mable, gently prodding her to talk about the effects of poverty and discrimination on her family". The film does the same with Black Power leaders and icons including Angela Davis, Bobby Seale, and Eldridge Cleaver, and thus the Black Power movement is portrayed in a more positive light that is usually reserved for the Civil Rights Movement when analyzing United States History. The film also includes a scene in which the head of TV Guide, an American publication, claims that Swedish coverage of American news stories, specifically the ones sympathetic to the Black Panther Party, are overly negative and "Anti-American".

=== War on drugs ===
The 1973-1975 recap documented within the film focuses heavily on the detrimental effects of the war on drugs in African-American communities including its contribution to the heroin epidemic, while also documenting the rise of Nation of Islam. In the Film Juice review of the film, editor Alex Moss claims,

Sadly, once the Black Power Mixtape shifts its emphasis from the Black Panthers to the Nation of Islam and the War on Drugs, the documentary begins to lose both its precision and its power. An interview with Louis Farrakhan is eerie in its fantastical delusions and the documentary's uncritical attitude towards the idea that the Nation of Islam offers a disciplined lifestyle heralds the arrival of a number of bizarre conspiracy theories including the somewhat inconsistent view that the authorities both turned a blind-eye to the drug trade in Black areas and cracked down on the drug trade in Black areas in a way that damaged the community and undermined the pursuit of civil rights.

Craig Detweiler of Paste offers similar sentiments in his review of the film, suggesting that drugs are portrayed in the documentary as a way that Black communities were placated in the midst of all the anger from the movement. "The ’70s are portrayed as a lost decade, where heroin floods the streets of Harlem. Vietnam veterans return home as addicts. Leaders’ focus gets fuzzy. And the war on drugs becomes a war against a particular community".

This confusion between the actual detriments of the war on drugs give way to an ending of the film that several critics have express does not seem quite complete. In the 1973 section of the documentary, one of the film's more memorable scenes includes a bus full of Swedes who are taking a tour through Harlem and are warned not to visit the neighborhood for "personal studies" because it is "only for black people" adding that it is a "black man's ghetto where everyone is trying to get high." Though the scene may call into question the intent of the Swedes depicted on the bus during a trying time for the African-American community, Olsson has acknowledged that the purpose of the scene was to portray "passive racism" on behalf of the Swedish tourists. The film also includes a scene in the 1974 section that depicts a young woman explaining her fight with heroin addiction and its prominence in the community. In documenting these interviews in the film, Olsson vividly displays the detriments of a community ravaged by drugs.

== See also ==
- List of black films of the 2010s

Similar collage documentary films:

- MLK/FBI (2020)
- I Am Not Your Negro (2016)
