= Josefine Adolfsson =

Swedish author and producer

Josefine Adolfsson is a Swedish author, and film and radio producer. She is known for her 2011 film Apflickorna.

== Early life and education ==
Josefine Adolfsson studied at Dramatiska Institutet in Stockholm.

== Career ==
She writes books that borders between fiction and reality. Her books include Kårnulf was here, Farlighetslagen, Ingens mamma and SWAT. She has also worked for several productions on Sveriges Radio, amongst them Magical Misery Tour and Sällskapslekar.

In 2001, she was awarded the Prix Europa award for the documentary Titta inte sådär på mig.

She co-produced, with Lisa Aschan, the film Apflickorna, which won the Dragon Award for Best Nordic Film at the Gothenburg Film Festival in 2011. At the 2011 Guldbagge Awards, she and Aschan won an award for Best Script.

Adolfsson was the founder of Lava at the Kulturhuset in Stockholm, and in 2002 she was awarded the Dagens Nyheter award Gulddraken for her work.

== Productions for radio ==
- Jourhavande kompis 2000
- Titta inte sådär på mig 2001
- Sällskapslekar 2001
- Magical Misery Tour 2001
- Sveriges fetradio 2002
- Läget 2003
- Om vi drömmer 2004

== Filmography ==
- Apflickorna (2011)
- She's Wild Again Tonight (2015)

== Bibliography ==
- Adolfsson, Josefine (2004). Kårnulf was here: en hembygdsskildring i fyra delar och två samtal. Stockholm: Atlas. Libris 9507675. ISBN 91-7389-132-0
- Adolfsson, Josefine (2009). Farlighetslagen. Stockholm: Bokförlaget Atlas. Libris 11456078. ISBN 978-91-7389-368-8
- Adolfsson, Josefine; Adolfsson Josefine, Andersson Lena, Boijsen Gabriella, Kracht Gunilla, Lindqvist Anna Sol, López Natacha, Magnusson Jane, Rabe Annina, Rahimi *Faranak, Sjögren Katarina, Stenberg Birgitta, Yngvesson Susanne Wigorts, Åberg Sofie (2013). Ingens mamma : tolv kvinnor om barnfrihet. Bokförlaget Atlas. Libris 14221456. ISBN 9789173894470
- Adolfsson, Josefine, Sandlund Fia-Stina (2016). SWAT - She's wild again tonight : en operation i August Strindbergs "Fröken Julie".
