= Lisa Aschan =

Swedish director and screenwriter (born 1978)

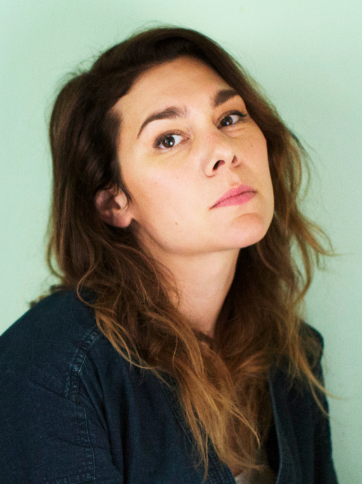
- Aschan in 2011
- Born: 1978 (age 46–47); Vejbystrand, Sweden
- Occupations: Director; screenwriter
- Known for: She Monkeys; Det vita folket

Lisa Aschan (born 1978) is a Swedish film director and screenwriter. Aschan went to film school in Stockholm and Denmark. During her studies, she became known for a commercial series called Fuck the Rapist! about a rape-protection. She worked as a director's assistant before releasing her first feature film, Apflickorna, in 2011, which garnered numerous film festival awards. In 2011, she was also awarded a 5 million Swedish kronor award by the Stockholm Film Festival' for her new project, Det vita folket (The White People), a science fiction-inspired story about government deportation camps. However, Aschan declined the money for the film, which later premiered in 2015. At Sweden's 2016 Guldbaggen Awards, Aschan was filmed in the audience giving the finger to Swedish cinematographer Gösta Reiland who had won the award for Best Cinematography besting Linda Wassberg in the same category for Det vita folket.

== Early life ==
Aschan was born in 1978 in Vejbystrand. At the age of twelve, she moved to Gothenburg and then studied at a boarding school in England. After that she studied at Stockholms Filmskola between 1989 and 1999, and at the National Film School of Denmark from 2001 to 2005 to become a director. During her studies, she became known for the commercials Fuck the Rapist!, a number of commercial films about a rape-protection consisting of an awl-clad tampon. Her short films In Transit and Goodbye Bluebird, which were made during the same time, have been shown at different film festivals.

== Career ==
In 2009, she was a director's assistant at the Royal Dramatic Theatre and directed the Danish TV series Thea & leoparden for DR's child TV section; the series has also been broadcast in Sweden and several other countries. The three-part series is about a girl who pretends to be a leopard. Aschan has stated that she likes to use animal parables in her productions to make it more clear about human behavioural patterns.

In 2011, she released her first feature film, Apflickorna, which premiered at the Gothenburg Film Festival and won the Dragon Award Best Nordic Film and FIPRESCI awards.

Apflickorna has also won the award for Best Narrative Feature at the 2011 Tribeca Film Festival, Best Cinematography at the Transilvania International Film Festival, as well as a Special Mention at the Berlin Film Festival. At the 2012 Guldbagge Awards, Aschan and Josefine Adolfsson won the award for Best Script for the film, and the film also won the Best Film and Best Sound categories.

In 2011, Aschan was awarded the Stockholm Film Festival's newly created long-film scholarship of 5 million Swedish kronor (about €550,000, £480,000, or $770,000 in 2011) for her new project, Det vita folket, a science fiction-inspired story about the camps where the government places foreigners that are awaiting deportation. Aschan declined the money as she did not feel that her project fell under the rules of the award. Aschan has described Det vita folket as a space epos with inspiration from the horror film The Shining. The film had its premiere in 2015.

At the 2016 Guldbaggen Awards, Aschan was filmed in the audience giving the finger and saying "Fuck You" to Swedish cinematographer Gösta Reiland. This was after Reiland had won the award for Best Cinematography, and was on his way up to the stage to receive the award. Linda Wassberg, who had filmed Det vita folket, was also nominated in the same category, and Aschan called it a "spontaneous reaction" to Wassberg losing to Reiland.

== Filmography ==
- 2003 – Borta i tankar (based on a novel by Alejandro Leiva Wenger)
- 2004 – Fuck the Rapist!
- 2006 – In Transit
- 2007 – Goodbye Bluebird
- 2009 – Thea & leoparden
- 2011 – She Monkeys
- 2015 – Det vita folket
- 2018 – Guds tystnad (short film)
- 2019 – Call Mom!
- 2023 – Thank You, I'm Sorry
