= Clay Ketter =

American painter, sculptor and photographer

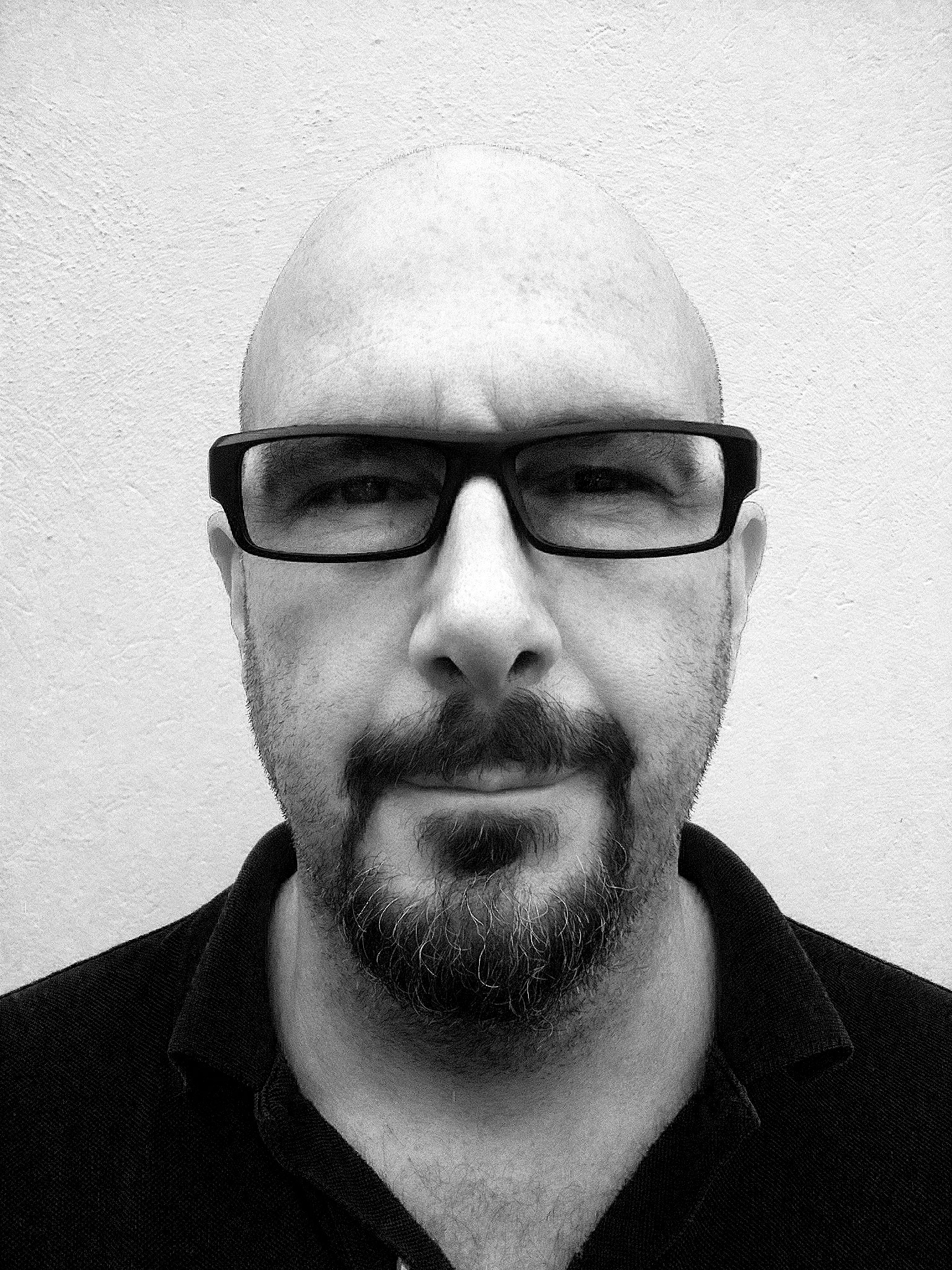
- Born: May 3, 1961 (age 65); Brunswick, Maine
- Occupations: Photographer, painter, sculptor

Clay Ketter (born May 3, 1961) is an American painter, sculptor and photographer. Ketter lives and works in Sweden.

== Early life ==
Ketter was born in Brunswick, Maine. He received a degree in art from the State University of New York, Purchase in 1985. Ketter worked initially as a carpenter and cabinetmaker, a skill which would become part of his artistic practice.

== Work ==
Ketter's work often invokes traditional carpentry and house construction methods, and has been called minimalist in its form. From 1992 to 1999, Ketter produced a series of paintings resembling actual wall sections and made of the traditional components of a wall, including gypsum, plaster and drywall screws. In the 1990s he also began his so-called "kitchen works", creating minimalist sculptures that resemble IKEA kitchen cabinets constructed in unique forms and configurations.

In 1996 he presented the show Clay Ketter: New Work at White Cube in London, England. His work was included in Every Day" 11th Biennale of Sydney, 1998. In 2009 Ketter's work was presented in a solo show at the Moderna Museet, Stockholm.
