= Play (2011 film) =

Film by Ruben Östlund

- Theatrical release poster
- Directed by: Ruben Östlund
- Written by: Ruben Östlund; Erik Hemmendorff
- Produced by: Erik Hemmendorff
- Cinematography: Marius Dybwad Brandrud
- Edited by: Jacob Secher Schulsinger
- Production companies: Plattform Produktion; Coproduction Office
- Release dates: 15 May 2011 (Cannes); 11 November 2011 (Sweden)
- Running time: 118 minutes
- Country: Sweden
- Language: Swedish

Play is a 2011 Swedish drama film directed by Ruben Östlund, and written by Östlund and Erik Hemmendorff. Inspired by actual court cases, it portrays a group of black boys who rob a smaller group of white boys by means of a psychological game. The film was heavily debated in the Swedish press. It won the Nordic Council Film Prize in 2012.

== Plot ==
In Gothenburg a gang of five Swedish-Somali teenage boys act out an elaborate scheme for taking the belongings of three teenage boys, in which the gang members play good cop/bad cop which is previewed at the very start of the film with an earlier theft from two different boys. First, they ask the time. When one of the victims checks the time on his mobile phone they claim it looks like one which was stolen from a brother of one of them. The three boys seek help in a coffee shop, and the owner offers shelter but does not feel the need to call the police, as requested. The 3 are ultimately intimidated to come along with the 5 to verify this with "the brother".

The film is interspersed with scenes of adults traveling in a comfortable, uncrowded train. At one point the conductor announces that a cradle has been found and should be picked up lest it would be removed for safety and fire precautions - the travelers chuckle. When the conductor removes it at one station the station manager brings it back into the train, because the message had merely been announced in Swedish, and is then repeated in English.

In the tram, a gang of 3 adults are beating them up, as per a woman, searching for a stolen phone. Two boys get separated from the other six. A man witnesses the scene but does not interfere, but slips a note with his name to one of the boys, saying he would stand witness in trial if need be. Eventually, the one boy offers the other boy to make a call, then calls his mother and leaves a message. It is not her, but the rest of the group calling him back, telling them their location so they reunite. After some moving around, and the boy being forced to play "The Entertainer" on his clarinet, one boy of the gang wants to quit; the gang questions him and the eldest /leader responds by beating him up in the bus, and kicking him. An older man tries to interfere, but is intimated by one of the boys. None of the adults help the boy even though he is injured. The four remaining gang members proceed with the three boys.

The group exits past a building site with large machines and a couple of security guards safeguarding the building site. They walk into meadow at a lake under a tree. The four force the three to participate in a running contest, with one of the three against one of the four, where the group of the winner gets all valuables of all the boys. The two walk along a curved path to the starting point from where they have to run back to the others. The three lose due to a trick of the four: the boy from the group of three thought they had to run along the path, but the other boy ran straight. The 5 argue about the bounty, justifying their share according to the roles one saying "I played good cop" another "I played bad cop". The three are free to go. Without phone to contact their parents and without money for the tram, they travel without a ticket; they do not explain the circumstances to the 2 conductors, get fined 1200 Kronas each and scolded for fare evasion. Later the gang is seen in a restaurant when the mother of one of the other boys calls. They make fun of her and him.

Half a year later the father of one of the victims walks in a park with his son and a friend with his son. The victim recognizes the gang member sitting on a bench with the wooden cradle. The father and his friend ask for the phone and pull him when he does not comply. A pregnant female bystander disapproves but is told to stand clear. After the boy forks out the phone, the two adults leave him alone but get confronted by two female witnesses. The man yells and ignores them and the 2 fathers walk away with their 2 sons, telling them they do not need to be afraid, and that everything was in order.

The last scene plays in a school, where a white girl is dancing convincingly to African music, followed by one of the boys playing a classic piece terribly on his clarinet.

== Reception ==
=== Critics' reviews ===
Play was generally acclaimed by critics; Felperin called it 30 minutes too long. The film holds an 81/100 average on Metacritic. Review aggregator Rotten Tomatoes also reports 80% approval with an average rating of 7/10, based on 15 reviews.

=== Political reaction ===
The film led to a public debate in Swedish mass media, which in particular saw many indignant reactions from the left side of the political spectrum. The debate was triggered when author Jonas Hassen Khemiri published a list in Dagens Nyheter, with the title "47 reasons that I cried when I saw Ruben Östlund's film Play". Among Hassen Khemiri's reasons were number six, "because I thought it was racist", and number 27, "because the audience laughed when the black robbers called a white guy an ape".

Åsa Linderborg, chief cultural editor of Aftonbladet, wrote a column about the film where she criticized it for having an unclear message. She described her encounter with a black man soon after watching Play:

"Within a nanosecond, my involuntarily programmed brain rolled out the same confused trailer for the progression of history as it always does when I see a coloured human: slave ships, Tintin in the Congo, cotton plantations, Rwanda, ANC, Muhammad Ali, the Cosby family, I Have a Dream, negerbollar, Malcolm X, children with flies in the face, Obama, AIDS, Idi Amin... a suburban mob stealing cell phones. I refuse to believe that it is this – another cliché – that Ruben Östlund wants to achieve. But what is it he wants then?"

America Vera Zavala responded to Linderborg in the same newspaper. Vera Zavala argued that the film is not about race at all but about class, and described Linderborg's text as "language populism". She expressed admiration of Östlund as "the long-missing star in the Swedish director sky. [...] Someone who dares – despite the expected cliché accusations of racism – to describe a brutal class society where Swedes rob Swedes."

Lena Andersson of Dagens Nyheter argued that both class and race are secondary in the film; that it rather captures the universally human abuse of power, and that it is provoking because it allows the audience neither to put blame on someone else nor to feel guilty about itself in an easily recognisable way. Andersson wrote:

"What's troublesome with Östlund's film is that it holds up a mirror, for once not for the white to mirror its predominance in, but for the oppressed to see that he is capable to oppress. This burdens both parties. [...] The perception of 'the other' follows the same mechanisms whatever the name of the group is and doesn't become prettier because the group suffers or has suffered."
