= She Monkeys =

- Theatrical release poster
- Directed by: Lisa Aschan
- Written by: Josefine Adolfsson; Lisa Aschan
- Produced by: Helene Lindholm
- Starring: Mathilda Paradeiser; Linda Molin; Isabella Lindqvist
- Cinematography: Linda Wassberg
- Edited by: Kristofer Nordin
- Music by: Sami Sänpäkkilä
- Production company: Atmo
- Distributed by: TriArt Film
- Release dates: 31 January 2011 (Gothenburg Film Festival); 3 August 2011 (France); 2 September 2011 (Sweden)
- Running time: 84 minutes
- Country: Sweden
- Language: Swedish

She Monkeys (Swedish: Apflickorna) is a 2011 Swedish drama film directed by Lisa Aschan, starring Mathilda Paradeiser, Linda Molin and Isabella Lindqvist. The film focuses on psychological power struggles between two teenage girls engaged in equestrian vaulting.

== Cast ==
- Mathilda Paradeiser as Emma
- Linda Molin as Cassandra
- Isabella Lindqvist as Sara
- Sergej Merkusjev as Ivan
- Adam Lundgren as Jens
- Sigmund Hovind as Tobias
- Kevin Caicedo Vega as Sebastian

== Production ==
She Monkeys was produced as part of the Swedish Film Institute's Rookie Project, which provided financial support for which only debuting feature-film directors are eligible. Inspirations for the film included a picture of Shirley Temple and the 1928 novella Story of the Eye by George Bataille. Casting of the lead actors took four months. The filmmakers needed to find girls who not only could act, but also met the requirements of the physically demanding roles.

== Release ==
The film premiered on 31 January 2011 at the Gothenburg Film Festival. Several festival selections followed, including Berlin where it screened in the section Generation 14Plus, Tribeca and Karlovy Vary. The earliest regular release was in France, where ASC Distribution launched the film on 3 August 2011. The Swedish release is set to 2 September 2011 through TriArt Film.

== Reception ==
Alissa Simon of Variety called the film "one of the most intense and complex feature debuts to come from Sweden since Lukas Moodysson's Show Me Love", and wrote: "Aschan's provocative visual language links pleasure and pain as she focuses on the arousing nature of unpleasant things. Carefully framed compositions that are near cliche (a father cuddling his child, a babysitter helping a youngster with tooth brushing) take on fresh significance. ... Just as remarkably, Aschan draws convincing, naturalistic performances from her young non-pro actors while putting them in highly charged situations."

At the Gothenburg Film Festival, She Monkeys received the top competition prize, the Dragon Award for Best Nordic Film, with one million kronor in prize money. It also won the festival's FIPRESCI prize. The film received the award for Best Narrative Feature, World Narrative Competition Section at the Tribeca Film Festival. Linda Wassberg won the prize for Best Cinematography at the Transilvania International Film Festival in Romania.

== See also ==
- List of films about horses
- List of Swedish films of the 2010s
