= Göran Hugo Olsson =

Swedish film director (born 1973)

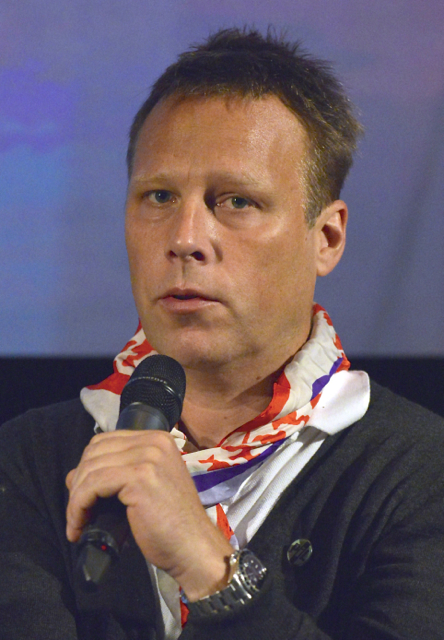
- Olsson in 2014
- Born: 20 September 1965 (age 60); Lund, Sweden
- Occupation: Film director

Göran Hugo Wilhelm Olsson (born 20 September 1965) is a Swedish film director, documentarist and screenwriter.

== Life and career ==
Born in Lund, Olsson studied at the Royal Swedish Academy of Fine Arts in Stockholm. He started his career working for Sveriges Television as a documentarist. He made his film debut in 1998 with Fuck You, Fuck You Very Much.

Olsson's 2011 documentary film The Black Power Mixtape 1967-1975 premiered at the 61st Berlin International Film Festival and was later screened at the 27th Sundance Film Festival. His following documentary film Concerning Violence premiered in-competition in the World Cinema Documentary Competition at 2014 Sundance Film Festival, and was screened at 64th Berlin International Film Festival, in which it was awarded the Cinema Fairbindet Prize. The film also won the Guldbagge Award for best documentary.

In 2018, Olsson directed That Summer, a portrait of Edith Ewing Bouvier Beale and her daughter Edith Bouvier Beale featuring some 1972 lost footage by Lee Radziwill predating the 1975 documentary Grey Gardens. The film premiered at the 68th Berlin Festival. In 2024, Olsson's documentary film Israel Palestine on Swedish TV 1958-1989 premiered out of competition at the 81st Venice International Film Festival.

== Selected filmography ==
- Fuck You, Fuck You Very Much (1998)
- Am I Black Enough for You (2009)
- The Black Power Mixtape 1967-1975 (2011)
- Concerning Violence (2014)
- That Summer (2018)
- Israel Palestine on Swedish TV 1958-1989 (2024)
