= Medborgarhuset =

Civic hall in Stockholm, Sweden

Coordinates: 59°18′52″N 18°04′20″E

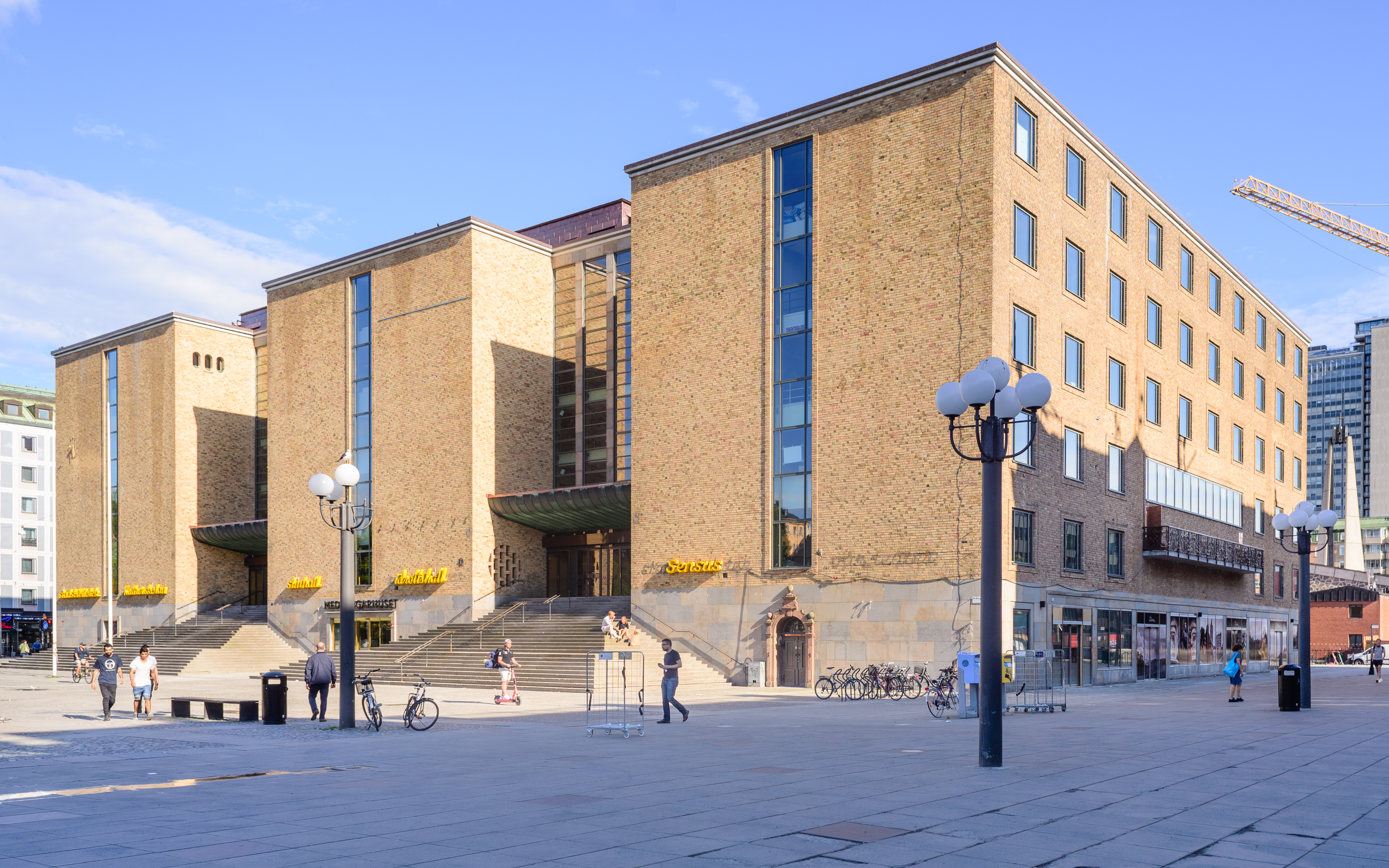
- Northern façade
- Interactive map of the Medborgarhuset area

General information
- Location: Stockholm, Sweden
- Construction started: 1936
- Completed: 1939

Design and construction
- Architect: Karl Martin Westerberg

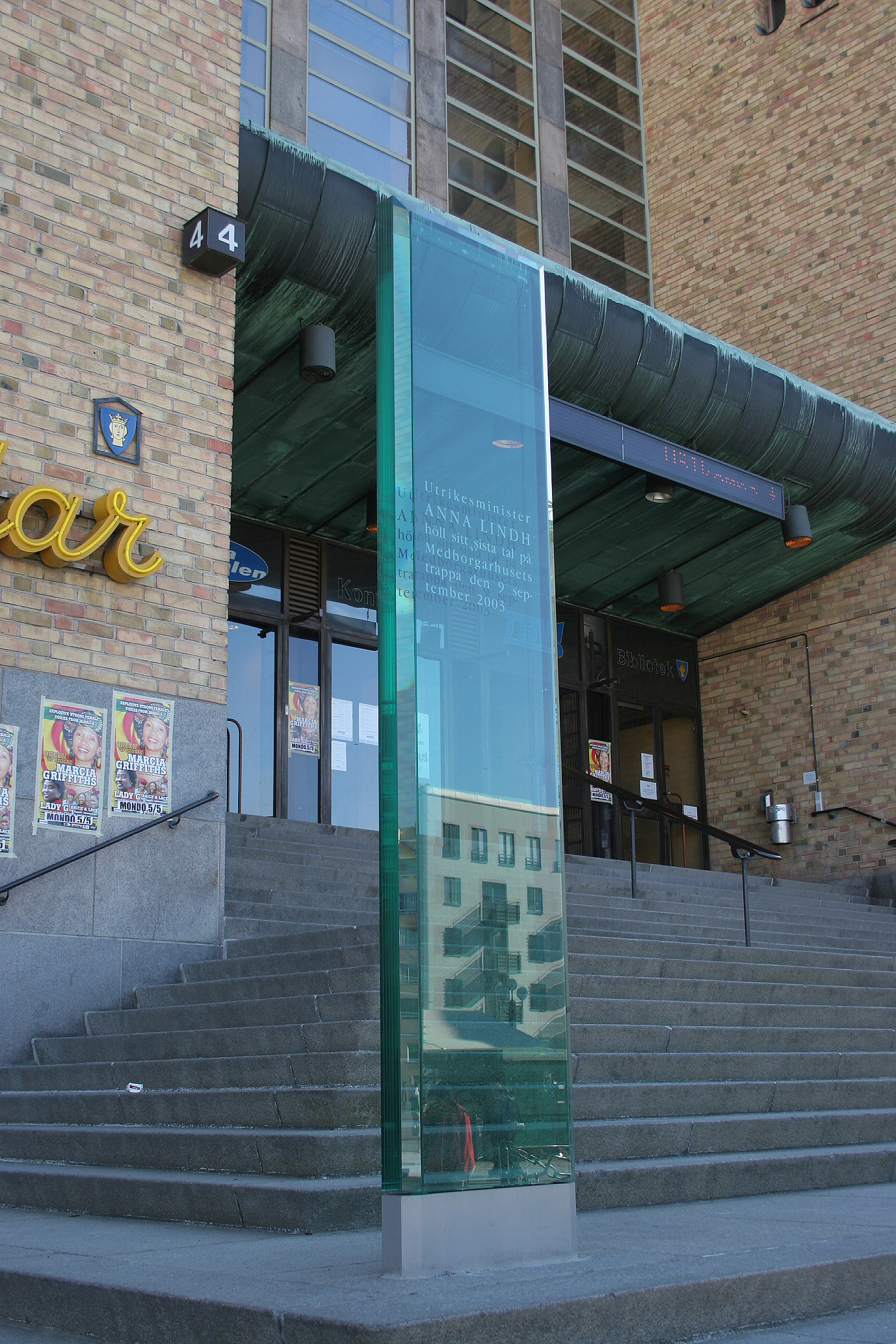
The Anna Lindh monument on the stairs of Medborgarhuset.

Forsgrenska medborgarhuset or colloquially Medborgarhuset (Swedish for Citizen's Building) is a civic hall in Stockholm, Sweden, located on the southern side of Medborgarplatsen, Södermalm.

The complex contains a public bath, an auditorium, a local library, a gymnasium, a children's theatre, and several meeting-rooms. The building was thoroughly restored in 1981, and the bath updated in 1988–1989 with the addition of a winter garden.

Built 1936–1939, the yellow brick building is the Neoclassical Functionalist design of Karl Martin Westerberg, even though the classical features of the tall gables facing the public square were significantly reduced in the final design. The architect thought to solve the complex programme by breaking up the volume into three parts to permit daylight to reach the core. Notwithstanding, the building forms a compact volume and renders heavy on its neighbourhood.

Swedish minister for foreign affairs Anna Lindh gave her last speech on the stairs of Medborgarhuset on September 9, 2003, two days before she was assassinated.

== See also ==
- Architecture of Stockholm
