= Marianne Fredriksson =

Swedish novelist and journalist (1927–2007)

- Born: 28 March 1927; Gothenburg
- Died: 11 February 2007 (aged 79); Österskär
- Writing career
- Notable works: Simon and the Oaks; According to Mary Magdalene

Marianne Fredriksson (née Persson; 28 March 1927 in Gothenburg – 11 February 2007 in Österskär) was a Swedish author who worked and lived in Roslagen and Stockholm. Before becoming a novelist, she was a journalist for various Swedish newspapers and magazines, including Svenska Dagbladet.

Fredriksson published fifteen novels, most of which have been translated into English, German, Dutch, and other languages. Most of her earlier books are based on biblical stories. A central theme in her writings is friendship, because as she maintained, "friendship will be more important than love" in the future.

== Bibliography ==
=== Fiction ===
- The Book of Eve (Evas bok, 1980)
- The Book of Cain (Kains bok, 1981)
- The Saga of Norea (Noreas Saga, 1983)
- Children of Paradise (Paradisets barn, 1985) (collection of the three earlier novels)
- Simon and the Oaks (Simon och ekarna, 1985)
- Nightwanderer (Den som vandrar om natten, 1988)
- The Enigma (Gåtan, 1989)
- (Syndafloden, 1990) (unknown if this book has been translated into English)
- Sofie (Blindgång, 1992)
- Hanna's Daughters (Anna, Hanna och Johanna, 1994)
- According to Mary Magdalene (Enligt Maria Magdalena, 1997)
- Inge & Mira (Flyttfåglar, 1999)
- Loved children, a k a: Elisabeth's Daughter (Älskade barn, 2001)
- (Skilda verkligheter, 2004) (unknown if this book has been translated into English)
- (Ondskans leende, 2006) (unknown if this book has been translated into English)

=== Non-fiction ===
- The Conditions of the Acacia (På akacians villkor, 1993), written with the architect Bengt Warne
- If Women Were Wise the World Would Stop (Om kvinnor vore kloka skulle världen stanna, 1993)
- The Eleventh Conspiracy (De elva sammansvurna, 1997), written with her daughter Ann Fredriksson
