= Cecilia Nilsson (actress) =

Swedish actress (born 1957)

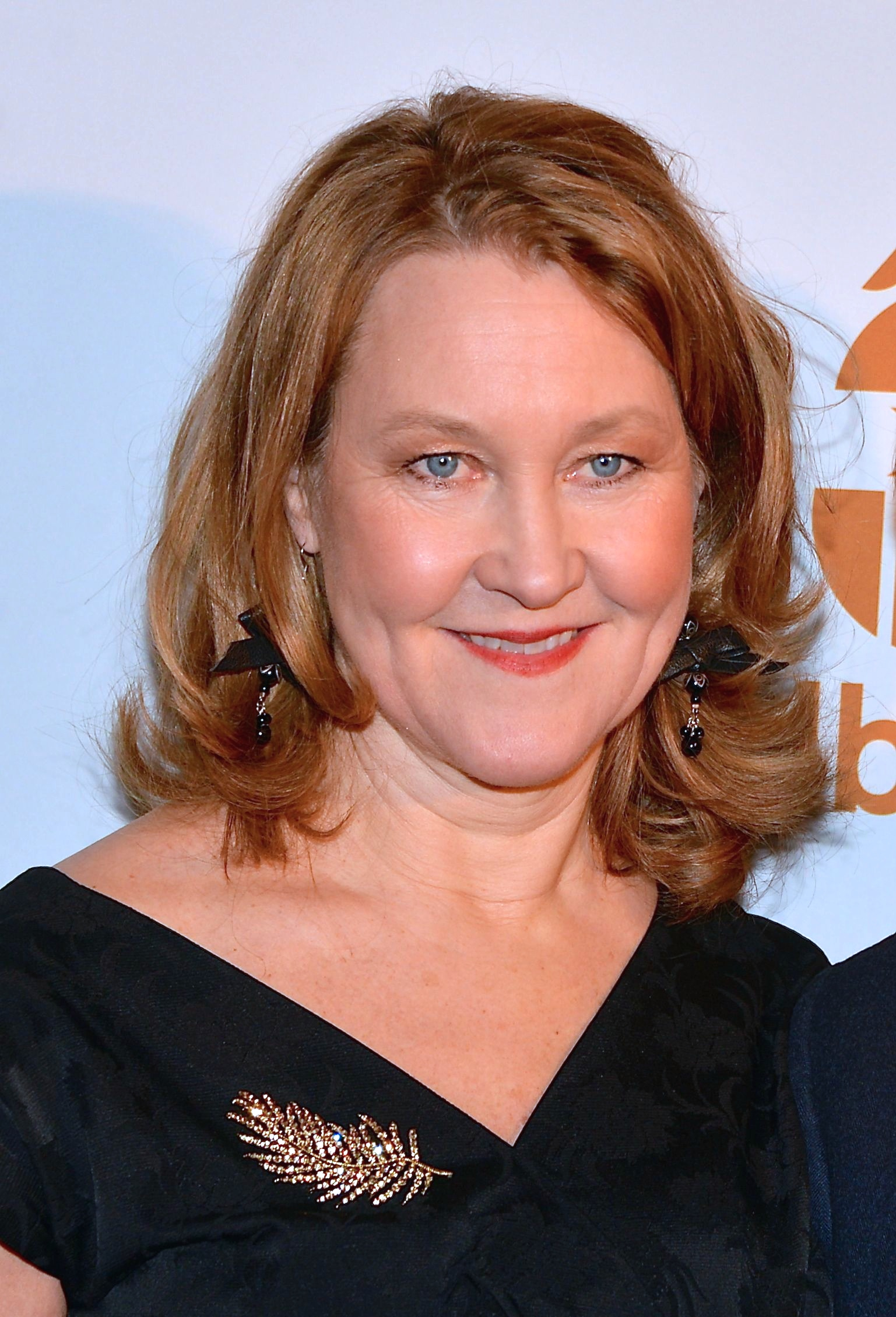
- Cecilia Nilsson in 2013.
- Born: Birgitta Maria Cecilia Nilsson; 15 July 1957 (age 68); Enskede, Sweden
- Occupation: Actress
- Years active: 1968–present
- Spouse: Krister Henriksson

Birgitta Maria Cecilia Nilsson (born 15 July 1957) is a Swedish actress. She has appeared at many theatres. She is married to Krister Henriksson.

Nilsson started acting in theatre aged six at Vår teater at Medborgarplatsen in Stockholm. As a student she attended the Adolf Fredrik's Music School in Stockholm. Her first theater appearance was in the play Woyzeck at the Royal Dramatic Theatre in 1968, and she also appeared in Minns du den stad (directed by Per Anders Fogelström) at Stockholm City Theatre in 1970–1971.

In 1973–1974 she hosted the children's program Fredax, and after that she hosted Lördags 1974–1975.

From 1978 to 1981 she studied at the Swedish National Academy of Mime and Acting. She was then engaged at Helsingborg City Theatre. From 1983 to 1988 she worked at Stockholm City Theatre.

In 1989 Nilsson received the Vilhelm Moberg-Award of Teaterförbundet and in 2007 the Riksteatern Scholarship. In 2012 she received a Guldbagge Award for her appearance in the 2011 film Simon and the Oaks.

== Selected filmography ==
- 2016 - Modus (TV)
- 2011 - Simon and the Oaks
- 2009 - Morden (TV)
- 2007 - How Soon Is Now? (TV)
- 2006 - Wallander – Fotografen (TV)
- 2006 - Wallander – Den svaga punkten (TV)
- 2005 - Kim Novak badade aldrig i Genesarets sjö
- 2004 - Graven (TV series) (TV)
- 2002 - Outside Your Door
- 2000 - A Summer Tale
- 2000 - Hur som helst är han jävligt död
- 2000 - Barnen på Luna (TV)
- 1997 - Lilla Jönssonligan på styva linan
- 1996 - Lilla Jönssonligan och cornflakeskuppen
- 1993 - Dockpojken
- 1985 - August Strindberg: ett liv (TV)
- 1973 - Den vita stenen (TV)
