= San Diego Black Film Festival =

The San Diego Black Film Festival is an annual film festival held in San Diego, California. The festival recognizes African American movies and production. It was founded in 2002 as the Noir Film Festival. It is one of the largest black film festivals in the United States.

== History ==
The San Diego Black Film Festival, originally known as the Noir Film Festival, began in 2003 in a hotel room in the Gaslamp Quarter. Three films were shown, and approximately 20 people attended. In 2006 the name of the festival was changed to the San Diego Black Film Festival because the organizers realized that there was confusion with "film noir". By 2011, with 120 films scheduled and between 15,000 and 30,000 attendees expected, the festival had become one of the largest black film festivals in the United States and one of the most important festivals in San Diego.

The festival screens films in the following categories: comedy, drama, documentaries, animation, GLBT, horror, religious, foreign/African Diaspora, shorts, feature films and music videos. The festival also hosts panes and reception banquets.

Venues have included United Artists Theatre in the Westfield Horton Plaza mall, the Pacific Gaslamp multiplex, the Reading Grossmont Theater in La Mesa, AMC Fashion Valley Theaters, UltraStar Mission Valley and the Theatre Box downtown. In 2017 it expanded to three theaters and began developing a Black Film Centre, which will ultimately host the festival as well as housing an archive.

Karen Willis is the director of the festival; Robin Givens has hosted it a number of times.
