= List of dramatic television series with LGBTQ characters: 2010–2015 =

This is a list of dramatic television series (including web television and miniseries) that premiered in 2010–2015 which feature lesbian, gay, bisexual, and transgender characters. Non-binary, pansexual, asexual, and graysexual characters are also included. The orientation can be portrayed on-screen, described in the dialogue or mentioned.

== 2010 ==
Year	Show	Network	Character	Actor	Notes
2010–2013	The Big C	Showtime	Lee	Hugh Dancy	Lee is gay and has stage IV cancer, which he eventually succumbs to.
2010–2014	Boardwalk Empire	HBO	Angela Darmody	Aleksa Palladino	Angela is bisexual, a housewife and mother, who falls in love with Louise.
2010–2014	Boardwalk Empire	HBO	Mary Dittrich	Lisa Joyce	Mary is bisexual, and a photographer's assistant to her husband.
2010–2014	Boardwalk Empire	HBO	Louise Bryant	Kristen Sieh	Louise is a lesbian, and a bohemian from San Francisco. She is killed by a mobster.
2010–2013	Dance Academy	ABC1; ABC3	Sammy Lieberman	Tom Green	Sammy is a student at the fictional National Academy of Dance. Sammy is in a relationship with Ollie, until his death.
2010–2013	Dance Academy	ABC1; ABC3	Ollie Lloyd	Keiynan Lonsdale	Ollie is in a relationship with Sammy until he dies, and then he dates Rhys O'Leary.
2010–2013	Dance Academy	ABC1; ABC3	Christian Reed	Jordan Rodrigues	Christian is Sammy's roommate, they share a kiss in season one.
2010–2013	Dance Academy	ABC1; ABC3	Rhys O'Leary	Richard Brancatisano	Rhys dates Ollie, after Sammy dies.
2010–2015	Downton Abbey	ITV; PBS	Thomas Barrow	Rob James-Collier	Thomas is gay. He is a footman in the aristocratic Crawley household and hides his sexuality due to the criminality of the time period. He also appears in the movie adaption.
2010–2015	Downton Abbey	ITV; PBS	Duke of Crowborough	Charlie Cox	The Duke of Crowborough is Lady Mary's suitor and Thomas's lover in the opening of the show.
2010–2011	Gigantic	TeenNick	Ryan Katins	Greg Ellis	Ryan is gay and the adoptive father of lead characters Piper and Finn. An action movie superstar, his children find him in bed with his boyfriend Charlie in the episode "Carpe Diem".
2010–2011	Gigantic	TeenNick	Charlie Maddock	Don O. Knowlton	Charlie is gay and Ryan's boyfriend.
2010–2011	Hellcats	The CW	Darwin	Jeremy Wong	Darwin is a gay cheerleader.
2010–2011	Law & Order: LA	NBC	Lt. Arleen Gonzales	Rachel Ticotin	Arleen is a lesbian. In the episode "El Sereno", Gonzales is accused of racial bigotry in a murder investigation. At trial she comes out, testifying that the bigotry she has faced for being gay has led her to overcome her own bigotry.
2010–2012	Lip Service	BBC Three	Cat McKenzie	Laura Fraser	Cat is a lesbian, and an architect whose girlfriend is a police officer.
2010–2012	Lip Service	BBC Three	Frankie Alan	Ruta Gedmintas	Frankie is bisexual.
2010–2012	Lip Service	BBC Three	Tess Roberts	Fiona Button	Tess is a lesbian. She is Cat's roommate and a struggling actor.
2010–2012	Lip Service	BBC Three	Sgt Sam Murray	Heather Peace	Sam is a lesbian police officer, and Cat's girlfriend.
2010–2012	Lip Service	BBC Three	Sadie Anderson	Natasha O'Keeffe	Sadie is a lesbian, and a borderline criminal.
2010–2012	Lip Service	BBC Three	Lexy Price	Anna Skellern	Lexy is lesbian, and a Doctor. In season 2 she has a crush on Sam.
2010–2012	Lip Service	BBC Three	Declan Love	Adam Sinclair	Declan is gay and Lexy's best friend.
2010–2012	Lip Service	BBC Three	Lou Foster	Roxanne McKee	Lou is a closeted bisexual, who has a secret relationship with Tess.
2010–2012	Lip Service	BBC Three	Lauren	Neve McIntosh	Lauren is lesbian, and an editor at a Scottish arts, culture and fashion magazine. Her partner is Jo.
2010–2012	Lip Service	BBC Three	Jo	Valerie Edmond	Jo is a lesbian art dealer, and Lauren's long-term partner.
2010–2015	Lost Girl	Showcase	Bo Dennis	Anna Silk	Bo is a bisexual succubus, meaning she can and often does drain the life force of others through intimate contact.
2010–2015	Lost Girl	Showcase	Lauren Lewis	Zoie Palmer	Lauren is lesbian, and a Doctor to the Fae.
2010–2015	Lost Girl	Showcase	Evony Fleurette Marquise	Emmanuelle Vaugier	Evony (aka The Morrigain), is bisexual and queen of the dark Fae. She lost her powers after oral sex with Lauren.
2010–2015	Lost Girl	Showcase	Vex	Paul Amos	Vex is bisexual, and ends up with Mark in the final episodes of the series.
2010–2015	Lost Girl	Showcase	Nadia	Athena Karkanis	Nadia is lesbian, and Lauren's girlfriend.
2010–2015	Lost Girl	Showcase	Tamsin	Rachel Skarsten	Tamsin is a bisexual Valkyrie who works as a bounty hunter and mercenary for the Dark Fae.
2010–2015	Lost Girl	Showcase	Crystal	Ali Liebert	Crystal is a lesbian waitress.
2010–2015	Lost Girl	Showcase	Mark	Luke Bilyk	Mark is bisexual, and ends up with Vex.
2010–2015	Lost Girl	Showcase	Dagny	Olivia Scriven	Dagny is pansexual and Tamsin's daughter.
2010–2019	Luther	BBC	Emma Lane	Rose Leslie	Emma is lesbian and Luther's new partner (season four).
2010	Outlaw	NBC	Lucinda Pearl	Carly Pope	Lucinda is bisexual and a private investigator.
2010–2015	Parenthood	NBC	Haddie Braverman	Sarah Ramos	Haddie is bisexual, and dates a few boys before figuring out she is into girls. She eventually begins dating Lauren.
2010–2015	Parenthood	NBC	Lauren	Tavi Gevinson	Lauren is lesbian, and Haddie's girlfriend from college.
2010–2017	Pretty Little Liars	Freeform	Emily Fields	Shay Mitchell	Emily realizes that she is a lesbian in Season 1 when she begins a romance with Maya and comes out to her father. She later marries Alison.
2010–2017	Pretty Little Liars	Freeform	Maya St. Germain	Bianca Lawson	Maya is lesbian, and Emily's first girlfriend.
2010–2017	Pretty Little Liars	Freeform	Paige McCullers	Lindsey Shaw	Paige is lesbian, and on the high school's swim team. She dates Emily for a while.
2010–2017	Pretty Little Liars	Freeform	Samara Cook	Claire Holt	Samara is a lesbian. She and Emily dated, but Samara did not want to be exclusive.
2010–2017	Pretty Little Liars	Freeform	Alison DiLaurentis	Sasha Pieterse	Alison is bisexual, and manipulative, secretive, and vindictive. She ends up marrying Emily and they had twins.
2010–2017	Pretty Little Liars	Freeform	Shana Fring	Aeriél Miranda	Shana is a lesbian, and works at a Halloween themed store. She dated Jenna and briefly dated Paige. She died after falling off a stage from being hit in the head with a gun.
2010–2017	Pretty Little Liars	Freeform	Talia Sandoval	Miranda Rae Mayo	Talia is lesbian, and she dated Emily for a while.
2010–2017	Pretty Little Liars	Freeform	Jenna Marshall	Tammin Sursok	Jenna is bisexual. She dated Shana for a while, but also forced herself on her step-brother.
2010–2017	Pretty Little Liars	Freeform	Charlotte DiLaurentis	Vanessa Ray	Charlotte is a trans woman, who is murdered after her reveal.
2010–2017	Pretty Little Liars	Freeform	Sabrina	Lulu Brud	Sabrina is a lesbian, and manager of a coffee shop, who also had cancer.
2010–2017	Pretty Little Liars	Freeform	Sara Harvey	Dre Davis	Sara is bisexual, and is found dead in a hotel bathtub.
2010–2017	Pretty Little Liars	Freeform	Rachel	Amelia Leigh Harris	Rachel is lesbian, and Sabrina's girlfriend.
2010–2015	Rookie Blue	Global	Gail Peck	Charlotte Sullivan	Gail is lesbian. Although she has a history with men in the first three seasons, in season 4 she comes out to herself after she meets forensic pathologist Holly Stewart.
2010–2015	Rookie Blue	Global	Holly Stewart	Aliyah O'Brien	Holly is lesbian. She is a forensic pathologist from Toronto who ran off to San Francisco. She dates Gail Peck.
2010–2015	Rookie Blue	Global	Frankie Anderson	Katharine Isabelle	Frankie is lesbian. After Holly leaves for San Francisco, Frankie begins dating Gail.
2010–2015	Rookie Blue	Global	Alex	Katy Grabstas	Alex is a trans man. He gets kicked out of his house for being transgender, and gets beat up by his girlfriend's brother, and tries to kill himself.
2010–2015	Rookie Blue	Global	Tabby Barnes	Tulsi Balram	Tabby is a trans woman. After she is arrested, she has to be searched. Since her drivers license says male, she is forced to be searched by a male officer.
2010–2015	Rookie Blue	Global	Jen Luck	Alexandra Ordolis	Jen is a lesbian police officer. She hits on Gail like a teenaged boy.
2010–2015	Rookie Blue	Global	Lisa	Lara Gilchrist	Lisa is a lesbian, and one of Holly's best friends since medical school.
2010	Rubicon	AMC	Kale Ingram	Arliss Howard	Kale is gay, and a director at an intelligence agency. His partner is Walter Carrington.
2010	Rubicon	AMC	Walter Carrington	Jon Patrick Walker	Walter is gay and Kale's partner.
2010	Rubicon	AMC	Donald Bloom	Michael Gaston	Donald is an ex-lover and colleague of Kale Ingram.
2010–2017	Sherlock	BBC One	Irene Adler	Lara Pulver	Irene is bisexual. She identifies as a lesbian but becomes attracted to Sherlock Holmes.
2010–2017	Sherlock	BBC One	Jim Moriarty	Andrew Scott	Jim is gay and Sherlock's arch enemy.
2010–2017	Sherlock	BBC One	Eurus Holmes	Sian Brooke	Eurus is pansexual, and Sherlock's lost sister that has been locked up in an institution since a young age. She is smarter than her brothers, and incredibly manipulative.
2010–2013	Spartacus	Starz	Barca	Antonio Te Maioha	Barca is gay, and Batiatus's bodyguard and sometimes hit man.
2010–2013	Spartacus	Starz	Pietros	Eka Darville	Pietros is gay, and Barcas' lover.
2010–2013	Spartacus	Starz	Auctus	Josef Brown	Auctus is gay, and Barca' lover after Pietros is killed.
2010–2013	Spartacus	Starz	Agron	Daniel Feuerriegel	Agron is a gay rebel warrior, in a relationship with Nasir.
2010–2013	Spartacus	Starz	Nasir	Pana Hema Taylor	Nasir is a gay rebel warrior, in a relationship with Agron.
2010–2013	Spartacus	Starz	Saxa	Ellen Hollman	Saxa is bisexual and one of a group of Germanic prisoners rescued from a slave ship.
2010–2013	Spartacus	Starz	Belesa	Luna Rioumina	Belesa is bisexual and a Thracian slave.
2010–2013	Spartacus	Starz	Tiberius	Christian Antidormi	Tiberius is gay.
2010–2013	Spartacus	Starz	Castus	Blessing Mokgohloa	Castus is a gay pirate.
2010–2013	Spartacus	Starz	Gaia	Jaime Murray	Gaia is bisexual.
2010–2013	Spartacus	Starz	Lucretia	Lucy Lawless	Lucretia is bisexual. She died in Spartacus: Vengeance.
2010–2015	Strike Back	Sky1; Cinemax	James Leatherby	Dougray Scott	Leatherby is gay, and a former SAS officer. He is also insanely jealous.
2010–2015	Strike Back	Sky1; Cinemax	Fahran	Daniel Ben Zenou	Fahran is Leatherby's lover. James shoots Fahran in the hand when he suspects Fahran of cheating on him with a bartender. He shoots the bartender in the back.
2010	Thorne	Sky1 HD	Phil Hendricks	Aidan Gillen	Phil is a gay forensic pathologist. The show is based on the novels of author Mark Billingham.
2010–2012	Upstairs Downstairs	BBC	Blanche Mottershead	Alex Kingston	Blanche is lesbian, and is a patron of the British Museum and an expert Egyptologist. She has a relationship with Portia that ends badly.
2010–2012	Upstairs Downstairs	BBC	Portia Alresford	Emilia Fox	Porits is lesbian, and Blanche's lover. She is a bohemian novelist.
2010	The Whole Truth	ABC	Alejo Salazar	Anthony Ruivivar	Alejo is a gay attorney.

== 2011 ==
Year	Show	Network	Character	Actor	Notes
2011–	Black Mirror	Netflix	Yorkie	Mackenzie Davis (young Yorkie)	Yorkie is a lesbian and Kelly is her love interest, in episode "San Junipero", which is a simulated reality where the deceased can live and the elderly can visit, all inhabiting their younger selves' bodies in a time of their choice.
2011–	Black Mirror	Netflix	Yorkie	Annabel Davis (elderly Yorkie)	Elderly Yorkie is comatose and living in an assisted living facility, she was in a car accident 40 years prior, after coming out to her religious parents.
2011–	Black Mirror	Netflix	Kelly	Gugu Mbatha-Raw (young Kelly)	Kelly is bisexual and Yorkie's love interest, in episode "San Junipero".
2011–	Black Mirror	Netflix	Kelly	Denise Burse (elderly Kelly)	Elderly Kelly sought refuge in San Junipero after her daughter died, and her husband killed himself.
2011–	Black Mirror	Netflix	Amy	Georgina Campbell	Amy is bisexual, and in a dating simulation, trying to find her compatible other.
2011–2014	Borgia	Canal+	Francesc Gacet	Art Malik	In the second season it is revealed that Francesc Gacet is a homosexual (then they said sodomite).
2011–2014	Borgia	Canal+	Giuliano della Rovere	Dejan Čukić	Giuliano della Rovere was condemned by the Council of Pisa as a sodomite. The Council said it was because of his fondness for Francesco Alidosi, and other young men.
2011–2014	Borgia	Canal+	Francesco Alidosi	Matt Di Angelo	Giuliano della Rovere was condemned by the Council of Pisa as a sodomite. The Council said it was because of his fondness for Francesco Alidosi, and other young men.
2011–2013	The Borgias	Showtime	Micheletto Corella	Sean Harris	Micheletto is an assassin for the Borgias family. His lover is Angelino, and then later Pascal.
2011–2013	The Borgias	Showtime	Angelino	Darwin Shaw	Angelino's lover is Micheletto Corella. Micheletto tells him that his impending marriage will be a lie. Angelino replies that he must proceed anyway, given the punishment for their homosexual relationship would be "disemboweled and burnt".
2011–2013	The Borgias	Showtime	Pascal	Charlie Carrick	In season three, Pascal becomes Michelotto's lover.
2011–2013	The Borgias	Showtime	Pope Alexander VI	Jeremy Irons	Florentine friar Savonarola accused Alexander VI of having same-sex affairs. He is generally considered by history as the most morally bankrupt pope in the church's history.
2011	Crownies	ABC1	Janet King	Marta Dusseldorp	Janet is a lesbian who lives with her partner Ashleigh Larsson, and she becomes pregnant via IVF. Her character continued in the Janet King spin-off.
2011	Crownies	ABC1	Ashleigh Larsson	Aimee Pedersen	Ashleigh is lesbian, and Janet's partner. She was shot and killed between seasons.
2011–2019	Game of Thrones	HBO	Renly Baratheon	Gethin Anthony	Renly is the gay brother of King Robert. He is in a secret relationship with Loras Tyrell.
2011–2019	Game of Thrones	HBO	Loras Tyrell	Finn Jones	Loras is gay and the Knight of Flowers. He is in a secret relationship with Renly Baratheon.
2011–2019	Game of Thrones	HBO	Oberyn Martell	Pedro Pascal	Prince Oberyn Martell, also known as the Red Viper, was a member of House Martell, the ruling family of Dorne. He is bisexual and has eight illegitimate daughters, collectively known as the "Sand Snakes".
2011–2019	Game of Thrones	HBO	Ellaria Sand	Indira Varma	Ellaria is the paramour to Oberyn Martell and mother to several of his bastard daughters, the Sand Snakes, later sent into deep mourning after the death of her lover, and is bisexual.
2011–2019	Game of Thrones	HBO	Marei	Josephine Gillan	Marei is a bisexual prostitute in the brothel owned by Lord Petyr Baelish. She slept with men, but also Ellaria Sand.
2011–2019	Game of Thrones	HBO	Olyvar	Will Tudor	Olyvar is a gay sex worker and a spy working for Petyr "Littlefinger" Baelish.
2011–2019	Game of Thrones	HBO	Varys	Conleth Hill	Varys is asexual. He said before being castrated that he had no romantic or sexual feelings for men or women.
2011–2019	Game of Thrones	HBO	Yara Greyjoy	Gemma Whelan	Yara is pansexual, and the only daughter of Lord Balon Greyjoy of the Iron Islands.
2011–2019	Game of Thrones	HBO	Doreah	Roxanne McKee	Doreah is bisexual and a handmaiden to Daenerys Targaryen. She helps Dany learn how to seduce her new husband with a hands-on tutorial.
2011–2019	Game of Thrones	HBO	Hodor	Kristian Nairn	Hodor is asexual. He was originally named Wylis, and became Hodor after having a seizure due to Bran Stark losing control of his powers during a vision of the past. His name is derived from the phrase "hold the door", the words that Hodor heard during the seizure that mentally disabled him.
2011–2015	Hart of Dixie	CW	Crickett Watts	Brandi Burkhardt	Crickett is a lesbian and the leader of the Bluebell Belles, a local women's group. She comes out as a lesbian in the season finale of Season 3. In Season 4, Crickett divorces her husband and begins a romance with Jaysene.
2011–2015	Hart of Dixie	CW	Jaysene Charles	Erica Piccininni	Jaysene is a lesbian who is a volunteer firefighter.
2011–2016	Hell on Wheels	AMC	Louise Ellison	Jennifer Ferrin	Louise is bisexual and a newspaper reporter sent by the New York Tribune to cover the building of the Union Pacific Railroad; she reveals that the assignment was a punishment for exhibiting attraction toward the newspaper editors daughter.
2011–2014	The Killing	AMC; Netflix	Regi Darnell	Annie Corley	Regi marries her female partner in the first episode of season 3.
2011–2014	The Killing	AMC; Netflix	Rachel "Bullet" Olmstead	Bex Taylor-Klaus	Bullet is a homeless teenage lesbian. She helps the detectives in their search for the killer of young women (season 3). She was eventually murdered by the serial killer.
2011–2014	The Killing	AMC; Netflix	Nicole Jackson	Claudia Ferri	Nicole is lesbian and in a relationship with Roberta Drays. She's the head of the Kalimish tribe and manager of the Wapi Eagle Casino.
2011–2014	The Killing	AMC; Netflix	Roberta Drays	Patti Kim	Roberta is lesbian and the girlfriend of Nicole Jackson. She's the security chief at the Wapi Eagle Casino.
2011–2014	The Killing	AMC; Netflix	Ellen	Hilary Strang	Ellen is lesbian, and Regi's girlfriend, and then wife.
2011–2013	Necessary Roughness	USA	Rex Evans	Travis Smith	Evans is the quarterback for the New York Hawks. He comes out at the end of season 2, becoming the first openly gay active football player in the show's universe.
2011–2018	Once Upon a Time	ABC	Mulan	Jamie Chung	Mulan, a warrior, is lesbian and in love with Aurora.
2011–2018	Once Upon a Time	ABC	Ruby Lucas	Meghan Ory	Ruby aka Little Red Riding Hood, is bisexual and friends with everyone, Ruby's in love with Dorothy Gale.
2011–2018	Once Upon a Time	ABC	Dorothy Gale	Teri Reeves	Dorothy is a lesbian, and that girl from Kansas. She is cursed and only True Love's Kiss (from Ruby) can awaken her.
2011–2018	Once Upon a Time	ABC	Alice	Rose Reynolds	Alice is lesbian. In the cursed realm, she is Tilly. In Season 7 episode 10, "The Eighth Witch", she reveals that her true love is Robin. They begin a romantic relationship.
2011–2018	Once Upon a Time	ABC	Robin	Tiera Skovbye	Robin is a lesbian. She is the daughter of Robin Hook and Zelena (the Wicked Witch of the West).
2011–2016	Person of Interest	CBS	Sameen Shaw	Sarah Shahi	Sameen is bisexual, a physician and a former operative for the U.S. Army Intelligence Support Activity.
2011–2016	Person of Interest	CBS	Root (Samantha Groves)	Amy Acker	Root is a lesbian and a computer genius, contract killer, and psychopath.
2011–2016	Person of Interest	CBS	Amy Enright	Erica Leerhsen	Amy is a lesbian, a charity director, and married to Maddie.
2011–2016	Person of Interest	CBS	Madeleine Enright	Sharon Leal	Madeleine is a lesbian, a physician, and married to Amy.
2011	The Playboy Club	NBC	Bunny Alice	Leah Renee	Alice is a Playboy Bunny and secretly lesbian. She is in a sham marriage with Sean, who is gay.
2011	The Playboy Club	NBC	Sean Beasley	Sean Maher	Sean is gay. Alice and Sean are in a sham marriage.
2011	The Playboy Club	NBC	Frances Dunhill	Cassidy Freeman	Frances is a closeted lesbian, who begins dating Nick Dalton to provide him with a politically acceptable public girlfriend and to make her appear heterosexual to her father.
2011–2015	Revenge	ABC	Nolan Ross	Gabriel Mann	Nolan is bisexual dotcom billionaire, and rates himself a 3 on the Kinsey scale.
2011–2015	Revenge	ABC	Tyler Barrol	Ashton Holmes	Tyler is a bisexual hustler, who has bipolar disorder.
2011–2015	Revenge	ABC	Marco Romero	E.J. Bonilla	Marco is a past gay lover of Nolan Ross, and was CEO of NolCorp, owned by Ross. Marco appears in flashbacks and in present-day in Season 2.
2011–2015	Revenge	ABC	Patrick Osbourne	Justin Hartley	Patrick is gay and the illegitimate son of Victoria Greyson (Madeline Stowe). Patrick and Nolan had a relationship in season 3.
2011–2015	Revenge	ABC	Regina	Seychelle Gabriel	Regina is a lesbian, and once kissed a girl while she was drunk.
2011–2012	Ringer	The CW	Olivia Charles	Jaime Murray	Olivia is a lesbian, and in a relationship with Catherine. She was previously married.
2011–2012	Ringer	The CW	Catherine Martin	Andrea Roth	Catherine is bisexual and in a relationship with Olivia.
2011–2016	Scott & Bailey	ITV	Helen Bartlett	Nicola Walker	Helen is a lesbian, and emotionally disturbed. She eventually commits suicide by slashing her wrists.
2011–2016	Scott & Bailey	ITV	Anna Ran	Jing Lusi	Anna is a lesbian, and a detective assigned to Syndicate 9.
2011–2016	Scott & Bailey	ITV	Louise	Caroline Harding	Louise is lesbian, and was Helen Bartletts girlfriend.

=== Shameless (2011–2021) ===
Shameless on Showtime (Seasons 1 - 11)
Character	Actor	Notes
Ian Gallagher	Cameron Monaghan	In the series pilot, Ian is a closeted gay, he comes out after his brother Lip (Jeremy Allen White), discovers his cache of gay pornography. Ian's first gay relationship in the series is with Kash Karib, owner of Kash and Grab, the neighborhood convenience store where Ian works. In season 1, episode 7, Ian has his first sexual encounter with Mickey Milkovich. Their relationship is on-and-off again throughout the series, with the two finally getting married in the series finale of season 10, in episode "Gallavich!". Ian's other sexual partners in the series run include, Lloyd Lishman, Caleb and Trevor.
Monica Gallagher	Chloe Webb	Monica is bisexual, and the Gallagher clan mother. She ran off to be with a woman, and then came back and hooked up with a drug dealer. She died of a cerebral hemorrhage following a drunken night out.
Debbie Gallagher	Emma Kenney	Debbie's sexuality is undefined, she had a child with her boyfriend Derek Delgado, and has been in lesbian relationships as well. When she sleeps with Claudia Nicolo's underage daughter, she has to register as a sex offender.
Mickey Milkovich	Noel Fisher	In the beginning of the series, Mickey is a closeted gay. His first gay encounter is with Ian Gallagher. They maintain a secret relationship until season 3, when Mickey's dad catches them together. Mickey publicly comes out, and reveals his love for Ian in season 4, episode 11. His relationship with Ian is on-and-off again throughout the series, with the two finally getting married in the series finale of season 10, in episode "Gallavich!". Mickey has a brief relationship with Byron Koch, in order to make Ian jealous.
Molly Milkovich	Madison Rothschild	Molly is a trans girl. She is the cousin of Mickey and Mandy Milkovich.
Sandy Milkovich	Elise Eberle	Sandy is a lesbian, and is dating Debbie.
Kash	Pej Vahdat	Kash is involved in a sexual relationship with Ian, owner of the Kash and Grab, where Ian works.
Jess	Missy Doty	Jess is a lesbian bartender at the neighborhood bar, The Alibi Room.
Lloyd Lishman	Harry Hamlin	Lloyd is a closeted gay. He picks up Ian in a gay bar in season two.
Svetlana Fisher	Isidora Goreshter	Svetlana is bisexual and a former sex worker. She was Mickey's wife, and then was in a polyamorous relationship with Veronica and Kev in season 6.
Veronica Fisher	Shanola Hampton	Veronica is bisexual. Veronica and Kev enter a polyamorous relationship with Svetlana in season 6.
Angela	Dichen Lachman	Angela is a lesbian that frequents the diner Fiona works at, but later leaves town (season 5).
Jasmine Hollander	Amy Smart	Jasmine is a bisexual friend of Fiona who is interested in her. After Fiona refuses to offer her financial help, Jasmine gets angry and leaves, never speaking to her again.
Caleb	Jeff Pierre	Caleb is bisexual and was Ian's boyfriend. Caleb cheated on him with his high school girlfriend.
Trevor	Elliot Fletcher	Trevor is a trans man, and an LGBT+ activist. Trevor and Ian were in a relationship in season 7.
Abraham Paige	Bradley Whitford	Abraham is a gay political activist. He is powerful, well-dressed and sophisticated.
Nessa	Jessica Szohr	Nessa is a lesbian, and Mel's girlfriend.
Mel	Perry Mattfeld	Mel is a lesbian, and Nessa's girlfriend.
Alex	Ashley Romans	Alex is lesbian, and briefly worked with Debbie for a while. She asks Debbie out for a drink.
Amanda	Nichole Bloom	Amanda is a bisexual college student and in a relationship with Lip. She exposes Lip's affair with a professor.
Claudia Nicolo	Constance Zimmer	Claudia is a bisexual, and sleeps with Debbie, thinking her to be a prostitute. After Debbie makes it clear she is not a prostitute, Claudia becomes her sugar mama.
Karen Jackson	Laura Slade Wiggins	Karen is bisexual. Her personality radically changed after a car accident almost killed her.
Barb	Lea DeLaria	Barb is a lesbian, and was Lip' sponsor for Alcoholics Anonymous.
Liz	Mia Barron	Liz is a lesbian, and was a customer of @DebbieHotLesbianConvict, Debbie's handyman company.
Roberta	Carlease Burke	Roberta is lesbian, and was Monica's girlfriend for a while.
Calista	Paula Andrea Placido	Calista is a lesbian, and along with her ex-wife Haley, they are opening up a new queer bar in the Gallagher's neighborhood. She hires Debbie to do a handyperson job.
Haley	Mary Alexis Cruz	Haley is a lesbian, and she is opening up a new queer bar in the Gallagher's neighborhood, with her ex-wife Calista.
Jill	Jenna Elfman	Jill is a lesbian, and was Monica's friend at the drug clinic, where they escape from.
Miss June	Roxy Wood	Miss June is a trans woman, busted by the police for selling loose cigarettes.
Geneva	Juliette Angelo	Geneva is a lesbian. She was involved in the Gay Jesus movement along with Ian, who portrayed Gay Jesus.
The Two Lisas	Jenica Bergere	A lesbian couple, both named Lisa, who were buying up numerous properties in the Gallagher's neighborhood for a gentrification project.
The Two Lisas	Lee Stark	A lesbian couple, both named Lisa, who were buying up numerous properties in the Gallagher's neighborhood for a gentrification project.
Byron Koch	Adam Farabee	Byron is gay, and has a brief relationship with Mickey, who is trying to make Ian jealous. Ian ends up beating Byron up after hearing him bad mouth Mickey, in season 10, episode 10.
Cole	Chester Lockhart	Cole is gay, and has a hook up with Ian; he found Cole on Grindr and invites him along on a date to make Mickey jealous. Cole ends up getting beat up by Mickey in season 10, episode 10.
Tim	Michael Sasaki	Tim is gay and his partner is Brendan. Ian and Mickey meet them while shopping, in their quest to make new gay friends, in episode "Two at a Biker Bar, One in the Lake".
Brendan	Brian Dare	Brendan is gay and his partner is Tim. Ian and Mickey meet them while shopping, in their quest to make new gay friends, in episode "Two at a Biker Bar, One in the Lake".
Jon	Giancarlo	Jon is gay and his partner is Travis. Ian and Mickey meet them at a dinner party, in their quest to make new gay friends, in episode "Two at a Biker Bar, One in the Lake".
Travis	Doug Locke	Travis is gay and his partner is Jon. Ian and Mickey meet them at a dinner party, in their quest to make new gay friends, in episode "Two at a Biker Bar, One in the Lake".
Kevin's Hookup	Chris Prascus	Kevin's Hookup (Don Wessels's kid), is gay. When Kevin starts to question his sexuality, he attempts to give oral sex to his hookup, but discovers that he is not turned on, and realizes he is not gay, not even part gay. In season 8, episode "Icarus Fell And Rusty Ate Him".
Tony Markovich	Tyler Jacob Moore	Tony is gay. He was the Gallagher's neighbor and a police officer. He had a thing for Fiona, but in season six, he comes out as gay to Ian Gallagher.
Tommy	Michael Patrick McGill	Tommy and Kermit are regulars at The Alibi Room, Kev and Veronica's bar. When they start selling marijuana for medicinal purposes, they encourage Tommy and Kermit to try some. The duo each consume a marijuana brownie, and when Kev and Veronica aren't looking, Tommy and Kermit consume all of the brownies and all of the marijuana gummies. Later in the men's bathroom, Tommy and Kermit are sharing a sink, when Kermit makes a reach for Tommy's butt and instead of pulling away, Tommy slowly leads Kermit into the stall for a hookup.
Kermit	Jim Hoffmaster	

=== 2011 continued ===
Year	Show	Network	Character	Actor	Notes
2011	Skins	MTV	Tea Marvelli	Sofia Black-D'Elia	Tea is a bisexual cheerleader. She sleeps with Tony, but ends up with Betty.
2011	Skins	MTV	Betty Nardone	Blaine Morris	Betty is lesbian, and Tea's lover.
2011–2017	Switched at Birth	Freeform	Matthew	Daniel Durant	Matthew is revealed as gay and has a crush on Emmett.
2011–2017	Switched at Birth	Freeform	Renzo	Alec Mapa	Renzo is gay and Kathryn's friend. Her husband John, has been openly bigoted towards Renzo.
2011–2017	Switched at Birth	Freeform	Natalie Pierce	Stephanie Nogueras	Natalie is lesbian, and comes out to Bay in season two. She and her girlfriend Hillary are not allowed into prom because Hillary is wearing a suit and pants.
2011–2017	Switched at Birth	Freeform	Hilary	Abby Walla	Hilary is a lesbian, and Natalie's girlfriend. She refuses to wear a dress at prom, having not worn one since she was 2.
2011–2015	Waterloo Road	BBC One	Martin Dunbar	Matt Greenwood	Martin is a shy trans girl who appears in one episode, resulting in her being bullied by classmates, but still makes some friends.
2011–2015	Waterloo Road	BBC One	Nate Gurney	Scott Haining	Nate is a former student at Waterloo Road, and openly gay. He falls in love with Josh.
2011–2015	Waterloo Road	BBC One	Colin Scott	Chris Finch	Colin is gay and works for a capital management company. He is the boyfriend of Matt Wilding.
2011–2015	Waterloo Road	BBC One	Josh Stevenson	William Rush	Josh came out as gay, and is Nate's boyfriend.
2011–2015	Waterloo Road	BBC One	Matt Wilding	Chris Geere	Matt is a closeted gay musician.
2011–2015	Waterloo Road	BBC One	Jo Lipsett	Sarah-Jane Potts	Jo is a lesbian, and head of the languages department. Her career is threatened when a student falls for her.
2011–2015	Waterloo Road	BBC One	Nikki Boston	Heather Peace	Nikki is lesbian, and a teacher at the school. She and Vix left the show together.
2011–2015	Waterloo Road	BBC One	Ros McCain	Sophie McShera	Ros is a lesbian, and falls in love with her teacher, Jo Lipsett.
2011–2015	Waterloo Road	BBC One	Kacey Barry	Brogan Ellis	Kacey is a trans boy, and student at the school. After disguising himself as a boy to play in a soccer match, he realizes how much more comfortable he is as a male. Kacey decides to postpone any medical changes until after school.
2011–2015	Waterloo Road	BBC One	Lorraine Donnegan	Daniela Denby-Ashe	Lorraine is a lesbian, and philanthropist and businesswoman. She is a former pupil at the school.
2011–2015	Waterloo Road	BBC One	Vix Spark	Kristin Atherton	Vix is a lesbian, and has a homemade jewellery business. She and Nikki leave to be together.

== 2012 ==
Year	Show	Network	Character	Actor	Notes
2012–2020	Arrow	The CW	Sara Lance	Caity Lotz (Jacqueline Wood)	Sara is bisexual and Nyssa's ex-lover. Jacqueline Wood played Sara in her first appearance on Arrow.
2012–2020	Arrow	The CW	Nyssa al Ghul	Katrina Law	Nyssa is bisexual, and ex-lover to Sara. When Sara died, Nyssa had her resurrected.
2012–2020	Arrow	The CW	Curtis Holt	Echo Kellum	Curtis is the show's first openly gay character.
2012–2020	Arrow	The CW	Paul Holt	Chenier Hundal	Paul is gay, and was Curtis' husband. He left Curtis after finding out he had been working with the Green Arrow.
2012–2020	Arrow	The CW	Nick Anastas	Evan Roderick	Nick is a gay police officer, and was in a relationship with Curtis.
2012–2020	Arrow	The CW	William	Ben Lewis	In a flash-forward, William is joking about his frequently absent father, and retorts: "And my ex-boyfriend wonders why I have commitment issues". In season 7, episode "The Longbow Hunters".
2012–2020	Arrow	The CW	Kate Kane	Ruby Rose (Wallis Day)	Kate is lesbian, and cousin of Bruce Wayne (aka Batman). At the beginning of season two, her plane crashes and she is presumed dead, but actually she is alive but unrecognizable due to injuries she sustained in the crash. At this point, Wallis Day took over the role of Kate.
2012–2020	Arrow	The CW	Alex Danvers	Chyler Leigh	Alex was a closeted lesbian, and then came out to herself and then finally everyone.
2012–2020	Arrow	The CW	John Constantine	Matt Ryan	John is bisexual and was brought in to deal with the fallout of the resurrection of Sara Lance, in episode "Haunted".
2012–2013	Bomb Girls	Global	Betty McRae	Ali Liebert	Betty is a closeted lesbian with an unrequited love for her best friend. After being rejected by her, Betty meets Teresa and they become romantically involved. She is a bomb builder for the Victory Munitions factory.
2012–2013	Bomb Girls	Global	Teresa	Rachel Wilson	Teresa is lesbian and a Canadian Women's Army Corps sergeant. She is in a relationship with Betty.
2012–	Call the Midwife	BBC One	Patience "Patsy" Mount	Emerald Fennell	Patsy is a closeted lesbian, and a midwife. She is in a relationship with Delia, and they later move to Scotland.
2012–	Call the Midwife	BBC One	Delia Bubsy	Kate Lamb	Delia is a lesbian nurse, and in a relationship with Patsy. Delia is struck by a vehicle while riding a bicycle and awakens with amnesia, not remembering who Patsy is to her. She recovers and they are reunited.
2012–	Chicago Fire	NBC	Leslie Shay	Lauren German	Leslie is a lesbian, and a paramedic on Ambulance 61.
2012–	Chicago Fire	NBC	Clarice Carthage	Shiri Appleby	Clarice is bisexual and the pregnant ex-girlfriend of Leslie. She leaves Leslie to go back to her husband.
2012–	Chicago Fire	NBC	Devon	Vedette Lim	Devon is a lesbian. In season 2 Leslie briefly dates Devon, who robs her apartment and disappears.
2012–	Chicago Fire	NBC	Emily Foster	Annie Ilonzeh	Emily is bisexual, and a paramedic.
2012–	Chicago Fire	NBC	Darren Ritter	Daniel Kyri	Darren is gay, and a firefighter.
2012–2015	Continuum	Showcase	Jasmine Garza	Luvia Petersen	Jasmine is bisexual, and a lethal paramilitary soldier.
2012	Don't Ever Wipe Tears Without Gloves	SVT1	Rasmus	Adam Pålsson	Rasmus is 19 and gay. After graduation, he moves from rural Värmland to Stockholm to attend college. As soon as he arrives in Stockholm he begins to seek out the gay community. He begins a relationship with Benjamin. Rasmus is later found to be HIV-positive and eventually dies.
2012	Don't Ever Wipe Tears Without Gloves	SVT1	Paul	Simon J. Berger	Paul is gay, and is portrayed as the life and soul of Stockholm's gay underworld. Paul eventually contracts AIDS and dies. An early scene in the miniseries shows two nurses dressed in bio-protective clothing caring for a patient suffering from AIDS. As the nurses tend to the dying man, one nurse wipes a tear from his eye, which leads to the second nurse scolding her afterwards: "Don't ever wipe tears without gloves".
2012	Don't Ever Wipe Tears Without Gloves	SVT1	Benjamin	Adam Lundgren	Benjamin is young and struggling to come to terms with his homosexuality and faith as a Jehovah's Witness. Benjamin begins a relationship with Rasmus, and stays by his side the entire time he is dying. Benjamin is the only one out of the three characters to survive the AIDS crisis, and is seen in the last episode reflecting about that period in his life 20 years later.
2012–2013	Emily Owens, M.D.	The CW	Tyra Dupre	Kelly McCreary	Tyra is a first-year surgical intern and daughter of the chief resident, who quickly befriends Emily. She is openly lesbian.
2012–2013	Emily Owens, M.D.	The CW	Jake Reeser	3 different babies portray Jake	Jake is an intersex baby who has a penis as well as ovaries. The parents discuss raising the child gender neutral and allowing them to decide when they are older.
2012	GCB	ABC	Blake Reilly	Mark Deklin	Blake is a closeted gay and in a marriage of convenience with Cricket, who is aware that he is gay.
2012–2017	Girls	HBO	Elijah Krantz	Andrew Rannells	Elijah is openly gay, and dates several men throughout the series, never really having a serious boyfriend.
2012–2017	Girls	HBO	George	Billy Morrissette	George is gay and one of Elijah's ex-boyfriends.
2012–2017	Girls	HBO	Dill Harcourt	Corey Stoll	Dill is gay, and a famous news anchor. He is the former boyfriend of Elijah.
2012–2017	Girls	HBO	Pal	Danny Strong	Pal is gay and a condescending prick. He is a former boyfriend of Elijah.
2012	The L.A. Complex	CTV; MuchMusic	Kaldrick King	Andra Fuller	Kaldrick King is a closeted gay black rapper. He is in a secret relationship with Tariq.
2012	The L.A. Complex	CTV; MuchMusic	Tariq Muhammad	Benjamin Charles Watson	Tariq is gay and an aspiring rapper working at the production company where Kaldrick records. The two start a secret relationship.
2012	The L.A. Complex	CTV; MuchMusic	Christopher Taylor	Jarod Joseph	Christopher is Kaldrick's openly gay lover who works as a lawyer.
2012–2016	Last Tango in Halifax	BBC One	Caroline Dawson	Sarah Lancashire	Caroline is lesbian. Caroline and Kate were married before Kate's untimely death.
2012–2016	Last Tango in Halifax	BBC One	Kate McKenzie	Nina Sosanya	Kate is lesbian, and married to Caroline.
2012–2016	Last Tango in Halifax	BBC One	Olga	Lorraine Burroughs	Olga is a lesbian, and the owner of a winery.
2012–2016	Last Tango in Halifax	BBC One	Judith	Ronni Ancona	Judith is bisexual and an international megastar of a film franchise.
2012–2021	Line of Duty	BBC Two BBC One (2017)	DCI Joanne Davidson	Kelly Macdonald	Joanne is lesbian and the SIO of "Operation Lighthouse" (season 6). She was accused by her ex, Farida, of cheating on her with Kate Fleming.
2012–2021	Line of Duty	BBC Two BBC One (2017)	PC/PS Farida Jatri	Anneika Rose	Farida is lesbian and was in a secret relationship with Joanne, her superior on the force.
2012–2018	Major Crimes	TNT	Rusty Beck	Graham Patrick Martin	Rusty comes out as gay in the season two finale.
2012–2018	Major Crimes	TNT	Gustavo Wallace	Rene Rosado	Gus is gay, he begins a relationship with Rusty.
2012–2018	Major Crimes	TNT	TJ Shaw	Patrick Stafford	TJ is gay, but he is deeply closeted.
2012–2015	Miss Fisher's Murder Mysteries	ABC	Dr. Elizabeth 'Mac' MacMillan	Tammy MacIntosh	Mac is a lesbian. She doesn't conceal her orientation and sports menswear.
2012–2015	Miss Fisher's Murder Mysteries	ABC	Daisy Murphy	Maria Coviello	Daisy is a lesbian, and Dr. Mac's lover, she is murdered by her ex-lover, Hetty.
2012–2015	Miss Fisher's Murder Mysteries	ABC	Hetty	Caroline Brazier	Hetty is a lesbian, and a factory worker with Daisy. She is love with Daisy and kills her when rejected for Dr. Mac. She also frames Dr. Mac for another murder.
2012–2015	Miss Fisher's Murder Mysteries	ABC	Sarah Norden	Eloise Mignon	Sarah is a lesbian, and a contortionist, she was in a relationship with Pearl.
2012–2015	Miss Fisher's Murder Mysteries	ABC	Pearl Dyson	Madeleine Vizard	Pearl is a lesbian, and an assistant for a magician. She is accidentally killed by a malfunctioning guillotine.
2012–2018	Nashville	ABC	Will Lexington	Chris Carmack	Will is a closeted up-and-coming country singer.
2012–2018	Nashville	ABC	Brent McKinney	Derek Krantz	Brent is an openly gay record executive.
2012–2018	Nashville	ABC	Kevin Bicks	Kyle Dean Massey	Kevin is an openly gay songwriter, stationed in Nashville.
2012–2018	Nashville	ABC	Zach Welles	Cameron Scoggins	Zach is gay and a young Silicon Valley entrepreneur, involved with Will Lexington.
2012–2018	Nashville	ABC	Jakob Fine	Murray Bartlett	Jakob is gay and a fashion designer for a commercial that Will appears in.
2012–2018	Nashville	ABC	Allyson Del Lago	Jen Richards	Allyson is a trans woman, and a physical therapist. Her character is the first transgender to ever appear on a CMT show and the first out transgender actor on the network.
2012–2018	Nashville	ABC	Jeff	Aaron Cavette	Jeff is gay and Zach's ex-boyfriend.
2012	Political Animals	USA	T.J. Hammond	Sebastian Stan	T.J. is the first openly gay son of an American President.
2012	Political Animals	USA	Diane Nash	Vanessa Redgrave	Justice Nash is the first openly gay Justice of the United States Supreme Court.
2012	Political Animals	USA	Sean Reeves	David Monahan	Reeves is a married, closeted Congressman with whom T.J. has had an affair.
2012–2017	Saving Hope	CTV; NBC	Shahir Hamza	Huse Madhavji	Shahir is gay and a neurosurgeon. His partner is Victor.
2012–2017	Saving Hope	CTV; NBC	Victor Reis	Salvatore Antonio	Victor is gay and an OR nurse. Shahir and Victor are in a long-term relationship.
2012–2017	Saving Hope	CTV; NBC	Maggie Lin	Julia Taylor Ross	Maggie is bisexual. She is an OB/GYN attending at Hope Zion Hospital. At the end of the series, Maggie and Sydney enter into a relationship.
2012–2017	Saving Hope	CTV; NBC	Sydney Katz	Stacey Farber	Sydney is lesbian, and an obstetrics and gynecology resident.
2012–2017	Saving Hope	CTV; NBC	Bree Hannigan	Rebecca Liddiard	Bree is lesbian, and was admitted to the hospital following a car accident. Scans reveal that Bree has cancer.
2012–2017	Saving Hope	CTV; NBC	Neshema	Hannah Miller	Neshema is a lesbian, and married to Ruth. She is pregnant.
2012–2017	Saving Hope	CTV; NBC	Violet Jackson	Bahia Watson	Violet is lesbian, and Bree's fiancé.
2012–2017	Saving Hope	CTV; NBC	Riley Stiles	Justin Kelly	Riley is intersex and is transitioning to male. When he comes to the hospital for surgery, he learns he had a gender assignment surgery as a baby.
2012–2017	Saving Hope	CTV; NBC	Ruth	Maggie Castle	Ruth is lesbian, and married to Neshema.
2012–2018	Scandal	ABC	Cyrus Beene	Jeff Perry	Cyrus is the White House Chief of Staff. He is openly gay and in a long-term relationship with James.
2012–2018	Scandal	ABC	James Novak	Dan Bucatinsky	James is married to Cyrus Beene, but eventually leaves him.
2012–2018	Scandal	ABC	Michael Ambruso	Matthew Del Negro	Michael is gay and a former prostitute. He marries Cyrus in a sham marriage.
2012–2018	Scandal	ABC	Fenton Glackland	Dean Norris	Fenton is a gay billionaire, and an ex-boyfriend of Cyrus.
2012–2018	Scandal	ABC	Annalise Keating	Viola Davis	Annalise is bisexual, and in a guest appearance in episode "Allow Me to Reintroduce Myself", she teams up with Olivia Pope (Kerry Washington) to work on a class action lawsuit regarding the mass incarceration of black people in the United States.
2012–2018	Scandal	ABC	Rose	Marla Gibbs	Rose is a lesbian, who hires Olivia to help find her ex-lover Lois, but Lois had already been murdered.
2012–2018	Scandal	ABC	Lois Moore	Fran Bennett	Lois is lesbian, and Olivia's neighbor. After Olivia was kidnapped, she was held hostage in Lois' apartment and the hostage takers eventually killed her.
2012–2018	Scandal	ABC	Gillian	Lauren Gaw	Gillian is lesbian, and Yasmeen's girlfriend.
2012–2018	Scandal	ABC	Yasmeen	Medalion Rahimi	Yasmeen is a lesbian, and the niece of the Bashranian president. She is killed when her plane leaving the U.S. explodes on the runway, in episode "Adventures in Babysitting".
2012–2013	Smash	NBC	Tom Levitt	Christian Borle	Tom is an openly gay composer.
2012–2013	Smash	NBC	Dennis	Phillip Spaeth	Dennis is gay, and an ex-lover of Tom.
2012–2013	Smash	NBC	Bobby	Wesley Taylor	Bobby is gay and was selected to be as part of the ensemble cast.
2012–2013	Smash	NBC	Sam Strickland	Leslie Odom Jr.	Sam is gay and Tom is his boyfriend.
2012–2013	Smash	NBC	John Goodwin	Neal Bledsoe	John is a gay lawyer. He and Tom dated briefly.
2012–2013	Smash	NBC	Ellis Boyd	Jaime Cepero	Ellis began as Tom's personal assistant, who he slept with, before becoming assistant to Broadway producer Eileen Rand. He left the series after season one and an ex-girlfriend later outed him as gay.
2012–2013	Smash	NBC	Kyle Bishop	Andy Mientus	Kyle is gay, and was in relationships with Blake, Tom and Jimmy.
2012–2013	Smash	NBC	Blake	Daniel Abeles	Blake is the lighting director for Hit List and he and Kyle became involved.
2012–2013	Underemployed	MTV	Sophia Swanson	Michelle Ang	Sophia is a lesbian, and an aspiring writer.
2012–2013	Underemployed	MTV	Laura	Angel M. Wainwright	Laura is lesbian, and Sophia's girlfriend for a short while.
2012–2013	Underemployed	MTV	Natalie	Katherine Cunningham	Natalie is a lesbian, and hooks up with Sophia a few times.

== 2013 ==
Year	Show	Network	Character	Actor	Notes
2013–2018	A Place to Call Home	Channel 7	James Bligh	David Berry	James is married but gay. He has experienced family disapproval and even horrific treatments including electroshock. The series was set in 1950s Australia, when homosexuality was illegal, and men were "held against their will in hospitals, electrocuted, pumped full of drugs and mentally abused".
2013–2018	A Place to Call Home	Channel 7	Harry Polson	Dominic Allburn	Harry is gay, and James Bligh's ex-lover.
2013–2018	A Place to Call Home	Channel 7	Dr. Henry Fox	Tim Draxl	Henry is gay, and has a relationship with James Bligh.
2013–2018	A Place to Call Home	Channel 7	Carolyn Bligh	Sara Wiseman	Carolyn is bisexual, and had an affair with Delia a long time ago.
2013–2018	A Place to Call Home	Channel 7	Delia Craig	Maya Stange	Delia is a lesbian, and had an affair with Carolyn years ago, but now back from London, they happen to be housemates.
2013–2020	Agents of S.H.I.E.L.D.	ABC	Joey Gutierrez	Juan Pablo Raba	Joey is a gay Inhuman who can melt metals, he previously had a boyfriend. Joey is the first openly gay character in the Marvel Cinematic Universe.
2013–2020	Agents of S.H.I.E.L.D.	ABC	Marcus Benson	Barry Shabaka Henley	Benson is a gay scientist recruited to help with the S.H.I.E.L.D science team in season 6.
2013–2020	Agents of S.H.I.E.L.D.	ABC	Victoria Hand	Saffron Burrows	Victoria is a lesbian, she was eventually shot and killed in the series.
2013–2020	Agents of S.H.I.E.L.D.	ABC	Isabelle Hartley	Lucy Lawless	Isabelle is a lesbian, and was killed when her SUV was flipped over by the Carl Creel.
2013–2020	Agents of S.H.I.E.L.D.	ABC	Olga Pachinko	Jolene Andersen	Olga is a lesbian and demolitions expert.
2013–2024	Amar es para siempre (To Love is Forever)	Antena 3	Amelia Ledesma	Carol Rovira	Amelia is a lesbian. During the day she works at a hotel, and then she sings at night. She is in a secret relationship with Luisita Gómez, as the show takes place in the 1970s.
2013–2024	Amar es para siempre (To Love is Forever)	Antena 3	Luisita Gómez	Paula Usero	Luisita Gómez is bisexual, but in a lesbian relationship with Amelia Ledesma.
2013–2024	Amar es para siempre (To Love is Forever)	Antena 3	Isabel Vegas	Silvia Maya	Isabel is a lesbian, and an LGBT activist.
2013–2024	Amar es para siempre (To Love is Forever)	Antena 3	Ana Rivas	Marina San José	Ana is a lesbian, and married to Teresa García.
2013–2024	Amar es para siempre (To Love is Forever)	Antena 3	Teresa García	Carlota Olcina	Teresa is a lesbian, and married to Ana. They both die, along with their child in a fire.
2013–2024	Amar es para siempre (To Love is Forever)	Antena 3	Sara Martín	Belén González	Sara is a lesbian, and a political activist for women's rights.
2013–2024	Amar es para siempre (To Love is Forever)	Antena 3	Juanma	Enrique Gimeno	Juanma is gay and Gonzalo is his boyfriend.
2013–2024	Amar es para siempre (To Love is Forever)	Antena 3	Gonzalo	Nacho Casalvaque	Gonzalo is gay and Juanma is his boyfriend.
2013–2015	Atlantis	BBC One	Pythagoras	Robert Emms	Pythagoras and Icarus are romantically involved in the second series.
2013–2015	Atlantis	BBC One	Icarus	Joseph Timms	Pythagoras and Icarus are romantically involved in the second series.
2013–2016	Banshee	Cinemax	Job	Hoon Lee	Job is a cross-dressing hairdresser who moonlights as a computer hacker. His sexuality is never explicitly defined, but actor Hoon Lee described the character as "someone who is exploring identity, he feels free to explore whatever direction his identity follows".
2013–2014	Betrayal	ABC	Jules Whitman	Sofia Black-D'Elia	Jules is a lesbian, and computer hacker, who has a relationship with Valerie.
2013–2014	Betrayal	ABC	Valerie McAllister	Elizabeth McLaughlin	Valerie is lesbian, and falls for Jules.
2013–2014	The Bridge	FX	Adriana Perez	Emily Rios	Adriana is a lesbian newspaper reporter.
2013–2014	The Bridge	FX	Lucy	Alyssa Diaz	Lucy is a lesbian nurse and Adriana's girlfriend, introduced in season 2.
2013–2017	Broadchurch	ITV	Maggie Radcliffe	Carolyn Pickles	Maggie is a lesbian, and a newspaper editor, in love with Jocelyn.
2013–2017	Broadchurch	ITV	Jocelyn Knight	Charlotte Rampling	Jocelyn is a lesbian, and a semi-retired barrister, in love with Maggie.
2013	Camp	NBC	Todd	Adam Garcia	Todd and Raffi are an interracial couple raising an adopted child. They get married in season 1, episode 7, "The Wedding".
2013	Camp	NBC	Raffi	Christopher Kirby	Todd and Raffi are an interracial couple raising an adopted child. They get married in season 1, episode 7, "The Wedding".
2013–2014	The Carrie Diaries	The CW	Walt Reynolds	Brendan Dooling	Walt is in the closet at first but after meeting Bennet, who is openly gay, he comes out and they are in a relationship.
2013–2014	The Carrie Diaries	The CW	Bennet Wilcox	Jake Robinson	Bennet is openly gay and Walt's boyfriend.
2013–2014	The Carrie Diaries	The CW	Larissa Loughlin	Freema Agyeman	Larissa is bisexual, a style editor at a magazine and party girl. She slept with Samantha.
2013–2014	The Carrie Diaries	The CW	Samantha "Sam" Jones	Lindsey Gort	Sam is bisexual and slept with Larissa.
2013–2014	The Carrie Diaries	The CW	Jill "Mouse" Chen	Ellen Wong	Mouse is a bisexual nerd. She slept with Donna.
2013–2014	The Carrie Diaries	The CW	Donna LaDonna	Chloe Bridges	Donna is bisexual and leader of the mean girls clique in school, and generally not very nice. She slept with Mouse while drunk.
2013–2014	The Carrie Diaries	The CW	Blake	Ian Quinlan	Blake is gay and asks Walt out on a date, but when they arrive at the restaurant, Bennet intervenes and tells Walt he wants them to be an exclusive couple.
2013–2015	Da Vinci's Demons	Starz	Leonardo da Vinci	Tom Riley	Leonardo da Vinci is bisexual. The shows creator, David S. Goyer, confirmed his bisexuality, along with actor Tom Riley who said: "He is, in my mind, canonically bisexual. He is attracted to men and he is attracted to women on the show." Da Vinci's Demons is a fictional account of Leonardo da Vinci's early life.
2013–2015	Da Vinci's Demons	Starz	Jacopo Saltarelli	Christopher Elson	Jacopa is a gay 17-year-old goldsmith apprentice, and prostitute. Da Vinci had sex with him and was later put on trial for sodomy, with Jacopa testifying against him. The charges were eventually dropped against Da Vinci.
2013–2015	Da Vinci's Demons	Starz	Andrea del Verrocchio	Allan Corduner	In season 2, episode 5, "The Sun and the Moon", it is implied that Andrea has a sexual relationship with a handsome young man (Benedetto), who works as a picture framer in his workshop.
2013	Dates	Channel 4	Erica	Gemma Chan	Erica is a closeted lesbian. Erica goes on a blind date with Kate.
2013	Dates	Channel 4	Kate	Katie McGrath	Kate is a lesbian, and has a one-night stand with Erica, which results in a second date.
2013–2015	Defiance	Syfy	Stahma Tarr	Jaime Murray	Stahma is bisexual, and a wealthy alien.
2013–2015	Defiance	Syfy	Kenya Rosewater	Mia Kirschner	Kenya is a bisexual bartender and brothel owner.
2013–2015	Defiance	Syfy	Doc Meh Yewll	Trenna Keating	Meh is a lesbian and is a Doctor in the town of Defiance.
2013–2015	Defiance	Syfy	Lev	Hannah Cheesman	Lev is a lesbian and Doc Yewll's wife.
2013–2015	Defiance	Syfy	Niles Pottinger	James Murray	Pottinger attended the same boarding school as Connor Lang, and had an unrequited gay crush on him.
2013–2016	Devious Maids	Lifetime	Alejandro Rubio	Matt Cedeño	Alejandro is a closeted gay Latin music star.
2013–2017	East Los High	Hulu	Camila Barrios	Vannessa Vasquez	Camila is bisexual and been friends with Jocelyn since high school and begin a romantic relationship.
2013–2017	East Los High	Hulu	Jocelyn Reyes	Andrea Sixtos	Jocelyn is lesbian, and hooked up with Camila after smoking pot together.
2013–2017	East Los High	Hulu	Daysi Cantu	Ser Anzoategui	Daysi is a queer, and a new student at East Los High.
2013–2017	East Los High	Hulu	Ms. Alvarez	Catherine Lazo	Ms. Alvarez is a lesbian, and the school principal.
2013–2017	East Los High	Hulu	Veronica	Jacqueline Grace Lopez	Veronica is a lesbian, and went out with Jocelyn.
2013–2016	The Fall	BBC Two	Danielle Ferrington	Niamh McGrady	Dani is a lesbian.
2013–2016	The Fall	BBC Two	Stella Gibson	Gillian Anderson	Stella is bisexual.
2013–2018	The Fosters	Freeform	Stef Adams-Foster	Teri Polo	Stef and Lena are a married lesbian couple. Stef has a son from a previous marriage. Stef and Lena also serve as adoptive and foster parents to additional children.
2013–2018	The Fosters	Freeform	Lena Adams-Foster	Sherri Saum	Stef and Lena are a married lesbian couple. Stef has a son from a previous marriage. Stef and Lena also serve as adoptive and foster parents to additional children.
2013–2018	The Fosters	Freeform	Jude Adams Foster	Hayden Byerly	Jude is gay and develops romantic feelings for his best friend Connor Stevens, and they begin dating.
2013–2018	The Fosters	Freeform	Connor Stevens	Gavin MacIntosh	In season 2, Connor comes out as gay, shares a kiss with Jude and the two begin dating.
2013–2018	The Fosters	Freeform	Cole	Tom Phelan	Cole is a trans boy, and a teen runaway who lives at a group foster home.
2013–2018	The Fosters	Freeform	Noah Walker	Kalama Epstein	Noah is gay and Jude's second boyfriend.
2013–2018	The Fosters	Freeform	Monte Porter	Annika Marks	Monte is bisexual and becomes the school principal of Lena's charter school in Season 2. She later gets in trouble for kissing a student.
2013–2018	The Fosters	Freeform	Aaron Baker	Elliot Fletcher	Aaron is a trans man who becomes Callie's boyfriend.
2013–2018	The Fosters	Freeform	Ximena Sinfuego	Lisseth Chavez	Ximena is a lesbian, and captain of the roller-derby team.
2013–2018	The Fosters	Freeform	Jack Downey	Tanner Buchanan	Jack shares a kiss with Jude to make him feel better after his breakup with Connor. Jack is later beaten to death by an abusive foster father.
2013–2018	The Fosters	Freeform	Carmen Cruz	Alicia Sixtos	Carmen is a lesbian living at Girls United who has been involved with gangs, drugs, and kidnapping.
2013–2018	The Fosters	Freeform	Jenna Paul	Suzanne Cryer	Jenna is a lesbian, and an old friend of Stef and Lena.
2013–2018	The Fosters	Freeform	Sally Benton	Pepi Sonuga	Sally is a lesbian, and accuses the principal of kissing her.
2013–2018	The Fosters	Freeform	Tess Bayfield	Kristen Ariza	Tess is bisexual and Steph's high-school crush.
2013–2018	The Fosters	Freeform	Kelly Paul	Alice Dodd	Kelly is a lesbian, and Jenna's ex-wife.
2013–2018	The Fosters	Freeform	Lara	Brit Manor	Lara is lesbian, and makes a pass at Tess.
2013–2015	Hannibal	NBC	Will Graham	Hugh Dancy	Will and Hannibal are in love with each other.
2013–2015	Hannibal	NBC	Hannibal Lecter	Mads Mikkelsen	Will and Hannibal are in love with each other.
2013–2015	Hannibal	NBC	Alana Bloom	Caroline Dhavernas	Alana is bisexual and Margot is homosexual. They are married.
2013–2015	Hannibal	NBC	Margot Verger	Katharine Isabelle	Alana is bisexual and Margot is homosexual. They are married.
2013–2015	Hit the Floor	VH1	Jude Kinkade	Brent Antonello	Jude is gay and Zero is a closeted bisexual basketball player, Jude is also Zero's agent. Jude and Zero begin having casual sex in season 2. In season 3, Zero comes out by kissing Jude in public, and the two are now in a committed relationship.
2013–2015	Hit the Floor	VH1	Zero (real name Gideon)	Adam Senn	Jude is gay and Zero is a closeted bisexual basketball player, Jude is also Zero's agent. Jude and Zero begin having casual sex in season 2. In season 3, Zero comes out by kissing Jude in public, and the two are now in a committed relationship.
2013–2015	Hit the Floor	VH1	Lucas	Jonathan Bennett	Lucas is a gay basketball agent, and had an affair with Jude, making Zero jealous.
2013–2015	Hit the Floor	VH1	Noah	Kristian Kordula	Noah is gay and Jude's boyfriend in season 4.
2013–2018	House of Cards	Netflix	Frank Underwood	Kevin Spacey	Frank has been shown to have sexual encounters with both men and women. The series creator, Beau Willimon, said that Frank ignores the label of being bisexual or gay, and is simply attracted to people regardless of their gender.
2013–2018	House of Cards	Netflix	Edward Meechum	Nathan Darrow	Meechum is a Secret Service agent assigned to Frank Underwood, and has a threesome with him and Claire Underwood in season 2, episode "Chapter 24".
2013–2018	House of Cards	Netflix	Rachel Posner	Rachel Brosnahan	Rachel is a bisexual prostitute.
2013–2018	House of Cards	Netflix	Lisa Williams	Kate Lyn Sheil	Lisa is lesbian, and Rachel's lover.
2013–2018	House of Cards	Netflix	Michael Corrigan	Christian Camargo	Michael is a gay rights activist, imprisoned by the Russian government. He eventually hangs himself in his cell, refusing a deal to be released if he apologizes to Russia for his unlawful actions, in season 3, episode "Chapter 32".
2013–2018	House of Cards	Netflix	John Pasternak	Todd Alan Crain	John is Michael Corrigan's husband.
2013-2014	In the Flesh	BBC Three	Kieren Walker	Luke Newberry	Kieren is pansexual and the protagonist of the show. Kieren was implied to have been in a romantic relationship with Rick Macy, who died in Afghanistan before the events of the show, ending their relationship. In series 2, Kieren begins dating Simon Monroe.
2013-2014	In the Flesh	BBC Three	Jemima Walker	Harriet Cains	Jem is Kieren's younger sister. While never explicitly stated or explored in the series, series creator Dominic Mitchell stated on Twitter that Jem is bisexual.
2013–2016	Masters of Sex	Showtime	Barton Scully	Beau Bridges	Barton is a closeted gay and the provost at the university where Masters initiates his study.
2013–2016	Masters of Sex	Showtime	Betty DeMillo	Annaleigh Ashford	Betty is a lesbian sex worker and an early research subject in Masters and Johnson's study.
2013–2016	Masters of Sex	Showtime	Helen	Sarah Silverman	Helen is lesbian. Betty and Helen are in a long-term relationship. Helen gets pregnant and dies during childbirth.
2013–2016	Masters of Sex	Showtime	Dale	Finn Wittrock	Dale is gay and a hustler whom Scully patronizes.
2013–2016	Masters of Sex	Showtime	Carl	Bobby Campo	Carl is gay and a hustler, and has sex with Dale.
2013–2016	Masters of Sex	Showtime	Guy	Nick Clifford	Guy is a closeted gay.
2013–2016	Masters of Sex	Showtime	Sarah	unknown baby	Sarah is intersex. The blood work suggests Sarah is a boy.
2013	Murder in Passing	YouTube	Epicene	Alexander Chapman	Epicene is a trans woman detective assigned to investigate the murder of Mars Brito, a trans man bike courier. The show was originally broadcast as a series of 30-second episodes on advertising video screens in the Toronto Transit Commission's subway system.
2013	Murder in Passing	YouTube	Mars Brito	Chase Joynt	Mars Brito is a trans man bike courier, whose murder sparks an investigation into his death. The noirish black and white series is now on YouTube.
2013–2015	My Mad Fat Diary	E4	Archie	Dan Cohen	Archie is revealed to be gay when he is caught spying on the men's changing room in the leisure centre where he works.
2013–2019	Orange Is the New Black	Netflix	Piper Chapman	Taylor Schilling	Piper is bisexual and the protagonist of the series. She was in a relationship with Alex before breaking up with her and becoming engaged to Larry Bloom.
2013–2019	Orange Is the New Black	Netflix	Alex Vause	Laura Prepon	Alex is lesbian, and an ex-drug dealer.
2013–2019	Orange Is the New Black	Netflix	Sophia Burset	Laverne Cox	Sophia is a trans woman. (Laverne Cox is transgender in real life. The Advocate suggested that Orange is the New Black is the first women-in-prison series that includes a real transgender woman playing the role of a transgender person.)
2013–2019	Orange Is the New Black	Netflix	Nicky Nichols	Natasha Lyonne	Nicky is a lesbian.
2013–2019	Orange Is the New Black	Netflix	Crazy Eyes	Uzo Aduba	Crazy Eyes is a lesbian.
2013–2019	Orange Is the New Black	Netflix	Carrie "Big Boo" Black	Lea DeLaria	Big Boo is a lesbian.
2013–2019	Orange Is the New Black	Netflix	Tricia Miller	Madeline Brewer	Tricia is a lesbian.
2013–2019	Orange Is the New Black	Netflix	Poussey Washington	Samira Wiley	Poussey is a lesbian.
2013–2019	Orange Is the New Black	Netflix	Lorna Morello	Yael Stone	Lorna is bisexual and has been involved with men and women.
2013–2019	Orange Is the New Black	Netflix	Brook Soso	Kimiko Glenn	Brook is pansexual. She revealed that she is attracted to people, not genders.
2013–2019	Orange Is the New Black	Netflix	Artesian McCullough	Emily Tarver	Artesian is a lesbian correctional officer.
2013–2019	Orange Is the New Black	Netflix	Maureen Kukudio	Emily Althaus	Maureen is a lesbian.
2013–2019	Orange Is the New Black	Netflix	Shani Abboud	Marie-Lou Nahhas	Shani is a lesbian.
2013–2019	Orange Is the New Black	Netflix	Stella Carlin	Ruby Rose	Stella is a lesbian.
2013–2019	Orange Is the New Black	Netflix	Zelda	Alicia Witt	Zelda is a lesbian.
2013–2019	Orange Is the New Black	Netflix	Desi Piscatella	Brad William Henke	Desi is an openly gay correctional officer.
2013–2019	Orange Is the New Black	Netflix	Dayanara "Daya" Diaz	Dasha Polanco	Dayanara is "gay for the stay". She is dating Dominga.
2013–2019	Orange Is the New Black	Netflix	Dominga "Daddy" Duarte	Vicci Martinez	Dominga is lesbian.
2013–2017	Orphan Black	Space BBC America	Cosima Niehaus	Tatiana Maslany	Cosima is lesbian and a graduate student in biology, and one of the clones.
2013–2017	Orphan Black	Space BBC America	Felix Dawkins	Jordan Gavaris	Felix is gay and the foster brother and confidant of Sarah, the show's main protagonist.
2013–2017	Orphan Black	Space BBC America	Delphine Cormier	Evelyne Brochu	Delphine is bisexual and in a relationship with Cosima.
2013–2017	Orphan Black	Space BBC America	Tony Sawicki	Tatiana Maslany	Tony is a transgender clone introduced in Season 2.
2013–2017	Orphan Black	Space BBC America	Shay Davydov	Ksenia Solo	Shay is a lesbian and had a brief relationship with Cosima.
2013–2017	Orphan Black	Space BBC America	Sarah Manning	Tatiana Maslany	Sarah is bisexual. This was later confirmed as true by Tatiana Maslany at Comic Con 2016.
2013–2017	Orphan Black	Space BBC America	Camilla Torres	Tatiana Maslany	Camilla is a lesbian.
2013–2022	Peaky Blinders	BBC Two	James	Josh O'Connor	James is a gay writer who lives with Ada Shelby and her son, Karl.
2013–2016	Please Like Me	ABC	Josh	Josh Thomas	Josh is openly gay, and dates several men throughout the series.
2013–2016	Please Like Me	ABC	Geoffrey	Wade Briggs	Geoffrey was Josh's first boyfriend.
2013–2016	Please Like Me	ABC	Patrick	Charles Cottier	Patrick is gay and had a brief fling with Josh.
2013–2016	Please Like Me	ABC	Arnold	Keegan Joyce	Arnold was Josh's boyfriend through most of the series.
2013–2016	Please Like Me	ABC	Hannah	Hannah Gadsby	Hannah is a lesbian, and lives with Josh's mother.
2013–2016	Please Like Me	ABC	Ben	David Quirk	Ben is bisexual and was a one-night stand of Josh's.
2013–2016	Please Like Me	ABC	Kyah	Freya Stafford	Kyah is lesbian, and Hannah's ex-girlfriend.
2013–2020	Ray Donovan	Showtime	Lena	Katherine Moennig	Lena is lesbian, and a personal assistant working for titular character Ray.
2013–2020	Ray Donovan	Showtime	Tommy Wheeler	Austin Nichols	Tommy is a closeted gay actor.
2013–2020	Ray Donovan	Showtime	Justine	Alexandra Turshen	Justine is bisexual and was Lena's girlfriend.
2013–2020	Ray Donovan	Showtime	Chloe Hunter	Alex Saxon	Chloe is a trans woman and a sex worker.
2013–2020	Ray Donovan	Showtime	Jeannie	Rya Kihlstedt	Jeannie is lesbian, and Lena's ex-girlfriend.
2013–2018	The Tunnel	Sky Atlantic Canal+	Elise Wassermann	Clémence Poésy	Elise is bisexual and has had sex with men out of practical necessity and has not experienced emotional involvement with any sex partner. Until she met Eryka Klein, Elise had never felt romantic attraction for someone. She falls in love with Eryka.
2013–2018	The Tunnel	Sky Atlantic Canal+	Eryka Klein	Laura De Boer	Eryka (lesbian) falls in love with Elise.
2013–2015	Under the Dome	CBS	Carolyn Hill	Aisha Hinds	Hill and Calvert are raising a daughter, Norrie Calvert-Hill, together.
2013–2015	Under the Dome	CBS	Alice Calvert	Samantha Mathis	Alice is a lesbian.
2013–2020	Vikings	History	Ragnar Lothbrok	Travis Fimmel	Ragnar is bisexual and on multiple occasions, has asked Athelstan to join him and Lagertha in bed.
2013–2020	Vikings	History	Lagertha	Katheryn Winnick	Lagertha is bisexual. In the season 4 time jump, she has been with Astrid for about 7 years.
2013–2020	Vikings	History	Astrid	Josefin Asplund	Astrid is bisexual. In season 4, she has been in a relationship with Lagertha for 7 years. In season 5, after being kidnapped by King Harald, she marries him and grows to become fond of him.
2013–2021	Wentworth	SoHo (season 1–4); Fox Showcase (season 5–8)	Franky Doyle	Nicole da Silva	Franky is lesbian.
2013–2021	Wentworth	SoHo (season 1–4); Fox Showcase (season 5–8)	Erica Davidson	Leeanna Walsman	Erica is bisexual.
2013–2021	Wentworth	SoHo (season 1–4); Fox Showcase (season 5–8)	Kim Chang	Ra Chapman	Kim is bisexual.
2013–2021	Wentworth	SoHo (season 1–4); Fox Showcase (season 5–8)	Joan Ferguson	Pamela Rabe	Joan is lesbian.
2013–2021	Wentworth	SoHo (season 1–4); Fox Showcase (season 5–8)	Maxine Conway	Socratis Otto	Maxine is a transgender woman.
2013–2021	Wentworth	SoHo (season 1–4); Fox Showcase (season 5–8)	Bridget Westfall	Libby Tanner	Bridget is lesbian.
2013–2021	Wentworth	SoHo (season 1–4); Fox Showcase (season 5–8)	Lucy Gambaro	Sally-Anne Upton	Lucy is lesbian.
2013–2021	Wentworth	SoHo (season 1–4); Fox Showcase (season 5–8)	Allie Novak	Kate Jenkinson	Allie is lesbian.
2013–2021	Wentworth	SoHo (season 1–4); Fox Showcase (season 5–8)	Bea Smith	Danielle Cormack	Bea is bisexual.
2013–2021	Wentworth	SoHo (season 1–4); Fox Showcase (season 5–8)	Jodie Spiteri	Pia Miranda	Jodie is bisexual.
2013–2021	Wentworth	SoHo (season 1–4); Fox Showcase (season 5–8)	Sean Brody	Rick Donald	Sean is gay and had a sexual relationship with Jake in the past.
2013–2021	Wentworth	SoHo (season 1–4); Fox Showcase (season 5–8)	Jake Stewart	Bernard Curry	Jake was in a sexual relationship with Sean.
2013–2021	Wentworth	SoHo (season 1–4); Fox Showcase (season 5–8)	Lou Kelly	Kate Box	Lou is lesbian.
2013–2021	Wentworth	SoHo (season 1–4); Fox Showcase (season 5–8)	Ruby Mitchell	Rarriwuy Hick	Ruby is lesbian.
2013–2021	Wentworth	SoHo (season 1–4); Fox Showcase (season 5–8)	Marie Winter	Susie Porter	Marie is bisexual.
2013–2021	Wentworth	SoHo (season 1–4); Fox Showcase (season 5–8)	Maxine Conway	Socratis Otto	Maxine is a trans woman.
2013–2021	Wentworth	SoHo (season 1–4); Fox Showcase (season 5–8)	Reb Keane	Zoe Terakes	Reb is a trans man.
2013–2021	Wentworth	SoHo (season 1–4); Fox Showcase (season 5–8)	Spike Baxter	Kate Elliott	Spike is lesbian.
2013–2021	Wentworth	SoHo (season 1–4); Fox Showcase (season 5–8)	Zara Dragovich	Natalia Novikova	Zara is lesbian.
2013–2021	Wentworth	SoHo (season 1–4); Fox Showcase (season 5–8)	Dana Malouf	Daniielle Alexis	Dana is a trans woman.
2013–2021	Wentworth	SoHo (season 1–4); Fox Showcase (season 5–8)	Jianna Riley	Tasia Zalar	Jianna is lesbian.
2013–2021	Wentworth	SoHo (season 1–4); Fox Showcase (season 5–8)	Shelley Hayes	Alinta Chidzey	Shelley is lesbian.

== 2014 ==
Year	Show	Network	Character	Actor	Notes
2014–2020	The 100	The CW	Lexa	Alycia Debnam-Carey	Lexa is a lesbian.
2014–2020	The 100	The CW	Clarke Griffin	Eliza Taylor	Clarke Griffin is bisexual. In season 1, Clarke has a relationship with Finn; in season 2 Clarke and Lexa kiss and consummate their relationship in season 3.
2014–2020	The 100	The CW	Niylah	Jessica Harmon	Niylah is a lesbian.
2014–2020	The 100	The CW	Nathan Miller	Jarod Joseph	Nathan Miller is gay.
2014–2020	The 100	The CW	Bryan	Jonathan Whitesell	Bryan is gay.
2014–2020	The 100	The CW	Eric Jackson	Sachin Sahel	Eric Jackson is gay.
2014–2019	The Affair	Showtime	Trevor Solloway	Jadon Sand	Trevor Solloway is a gay teen. He is the son of the main couple.
2014–2017	Black Sails	Starz	James Flint	Toby Stephens	James Flint is bisexual and was in a past relationship with Thomas (revealed in season two) and his wife, Miranda. Flint and Thomas's separation was the reason for Flint waging war against the British empire.
2014–2017	Black Sails	Starz	Eleanor Guthrie	Hannah New	Eleanor Guthrie is bisexual. In season one, she is in a relationship with Max.
2014–2017	Black Sails	Starz	Max	Jessica Parker Kennedy	Max is a lesbian. She is Eleanor's lover, then has a romantic relationship with Anne.
2014–2017	Black Sails	Starz	Anne Bonny	Clara Paget	Anne Bonny is bisexual. She starts a relationship with Max in season two.
2014–2017	Black Sails	Starz	Thomas Hamilton	Rupert Penry-Jones	Thomas Hamilton was Flint's lover.
2014–2021	Bosch	Amazon Prime Video	Grace Billets	Amy Aquino	Grace Billets has a lesbian affair with a Black female colleague in the LAPD, Kizmin Rider. She is a lieutenant who is a supervisor of the show's protagonist, Harry Bosch, at Hollywood Station.
2014–2021	Bosch	Amazon Prime Video	Kizmin Rider	Rose Rollins	The girlfriend of Grace Billets and detective with the LAPD.
2014–2016	Carmilla	Vervegirl	Carmilla Karnstein	Natasha Negovanlis	Carmilla Karnstein is a 100+ year old lesbian vampire.
2014–2016	Carmilla	Vervegirl	Laura Hollis	Elise Bauman	Laura Hollis is a lesbian. Carmilla and Laura are in a relationship.
2014–2016	Carmilla	Vervegirl	Danny Lawrence	Sharon Belle	Danny Lawrence is a lesbian.
2014–2016	Carmilla	Vervegirl	S. LaFontaine	K Alexander	LaFontaine is non-binary.
2014–2015	Chasing Life	Freeform	Brenna Carver	Haley Ramm	Brenna Carver is bisexual. She begins a relationship with Greer, despite the fact that Brenna already had a boyfriend. Later she chooses Greer over her boyfriend and they begin a relationship.
2014–2015	Chasing Life	Freeform	Greer Danville	Gracie Dzienny	Greer Danville is a lesbian.
2014–2015	Chasing Life	Freeform	Margo	Aurora Perrineau	Margo is a lesbian.
2014–2015	Chasing Life	Freeform	Juliet	Leisha Hailey	Juliet is a lesbian.
2014–2016	Faking It	MTV	Amy Raudenfeld	Rita Volk	Amy Raudenfeld is a lesbian.
2014–2016	Faking It	MTV	Shane Harvey	Michael Willett	Shane Harvey is openly gay.
2014–2016	Faking It	MTV	Lauren Cooper	Bailey De Young	Lauren Cooper is intersex.
2014–2016	Faking It	MTV	Reagan	Yvette Monreal	Reagan is lesbian and Amy's girlfriend in season 2.
2014–2016	Faking It	MTV	Noah	Elliot Fletcher	Noah is a trans man.
2014–2016	Faking It	MTV	Sabrina	Sophia Ali	Sabrina is a lesbian.
2014–2015	Finding Carter	MTV	Bird	Vanessa Morgan	Bird is bisexual and Madison is her love interest.
2014–2015	Finding Carter	MTV	Madison	Molly Kunz	Madison is lesbian.
2014–2023	The Flash	The CW	David Singh	Patrick Sabongui	David Singh is openly gay and the Central City police commander. He is married to Rob.
2014–2023	The Flash	The CW	Rob	Jeremy Schuetze	Rob is gay.
2014–2023	The Flash	The CW	Hartley Rathaway	Andy Mientus	Hartley Rathaway is openly gay.
2014–2023	The Flash	The CW	Nora West-Allen	Jessica Parker Kennedy	Nora West-Allen is queer.
2014–2023	The Flash	The CW	Kate Kane	Ruby Rose	Kate Kane is lesbian.
2014–2023	The Flash	The CW	Marlize DeVoe	Kim Engelbrecht	Marlize DeVoe is bisexual.
2014–2023	The Flash	The CW	Alex Danvers	Chyler Leigh	Alex Danvers is lesbian (guest appearance - 2017).
2014	Glue	E4	James Warwick	Billy Howle	James Warwick and Caleb "Cal" Bray were romantically involved.
2014	Glue	E4	Caleb "Cal" Bray	Tommy Lawrence Knight	Caleb "Cal" Bray and James Warwick were romantically involved, before Cal was murdered.
2014–2019	Gotham	Fox	Renee Montoya	Victoria Cartagena	Renee Montoya is lesbian, and is the ex-girlfriend of Barbara Kean.
2014–2019	Gotham	Fox	Barbara Kean	Erin Richards	Barbara Kean is bisexual.
2014–2019	Gotham	Fox	Tabitha Galavan	Jessica Lucas	Tabitha Galavan is bisexual.
2014–2019	Gotham	Fox	The Lady	Michelle Gomez	The Lady is bisexual.
2014–2019	Gotham	Fox	Oswald Cobblepot	Robin Lord Taylor	Oswald Cobblepot is in love with Edward Nygma.
2014–	Grantchester	ITV	Leonard Finch	Al Weaver	Leonard Finch is gay.
2014–	Grantchester	ITV	Daniel Marlowe	Oliver Dimsdale	Daniel Marlowe is gay.
2014–	Grantchester	ITV	Alex Simms	Tom Turner	Alex Simms is gay.
2014–2017	Halt and Catch Fire	AMC	Joe MacMillan	Lee Pace	Joe MacMillan is bisexual and a main character of the show.
2014–2017	Halt and Catch Fire	AMC	Malcolm "Lev" Levitan	August Emerson	Lev is openly gay.
2014–2017	Halt and Catch Fire	AMC	Haley Clark	Susanna Skaggs	Haley Clark is revealed to be lesbian in season 4.
2014–2015	Heartless	Kanal 5	Sofie	Julie Zangenberg	Sofie is a succubus lesbian that feeds on the life force of humans. She falls in love with Emilie.
2014–2015	Heartless	Kanal 5	Emilie	Julie Christiansen	Emilie is lesbian and falls in love with Sofie.
2014–2020	How to Get Away with Murder	ABC	Annalise Keating	Viola Davis	Annalise Keating is pansexual. She teaches law at college.
2014–2020	How to Get Away with Murder	ABC	Eve Rothlo	Famke Janssen	Eve Rothlo is lesbian.
2014–2020	How to Get Away with Murder	ABC	Connor Walsh	Jack Falahee	Connor Walsh is a gay law student. Connor Walsh and Oliver Hampton begin to date on and off throughout the seasons, culminating in their marriage in season 5.
2014–2020	How to Get Away with Murder	ABC	Oliver Hampton	Conrad Ricamora	Oliver Hampton is gay and an I.T. specialist whom Connor Walsh first seduced to get information. Over time, the two develop feelings for each other. They marry in season 5, and remain happy.
2014–2020	How to Get Away with Murder	ABC	Bonnie Winterbottom	Liza Weil	Bonnie Winterbottom is bisexual.
2014–2020	How to Get Away with Murder	ABC	Aiden Walker	Elliot Knight	Aiden Walker is bisexual. He slept with Connor and was engaged to a woman.
2014–2020	How to Get Away with Murder	ABC	Simon Drake	Behzad Dabu	Simon Drake is gay.
2014–2020	How to Get Away with Murder	ABC	Tegan Price	Amirah Vann	Tegan Price is lesbian.
2014–2020	How to Get Away with Murder	ABC	Jeff Walsh	D.W. Moffett	Jeff Walsh is gay. He is Connor's dad.
2014–2020	How to Get Away with Murder	ABC	Ted	Jim Abele	Ted is gay and married to Jeff Walsh.
2014–2020	How to Get Away with Murder	ABC	Jill Hartford	Alexandra Billings	Jill Hartford is a trans woman.
2014–2020	How to Get Away with Murder	ABC	Claire Telesco	Melinda Page Hamilton	Claire Telesco is a lesbian.
2014–2020	How to Get Away with Murder	ABC	Cora	Mercedes Mason	Cora is bisexual. She is Tegan's ex-wife.
2014–2020	How to Get Away with Murder	ABC	Nanda Hashim	Ramona DuBarry	Nanda Hashim is bisexual.
2014–2020	How to Get Away with Murder	ABC	Dani Alvodar	Alyssa Diaz	Dani Alvodar is a lesbian.
2014–2019	Jane the Virgin	The CW	Luisa Alver	Yara Martinez	Luisa Alver is lesbian.
2014–2019	Jane the Virgin	The CW	Rose Solano	Bridget Regan	Rose Solano is lesbian.
2014–2019	Jane the Virgin	The CW	Wesley Masters	Brian Jordan Alvarez	Wesley Masters is an openly gay writer attending grad school with Jane.
2014–2019	Jane the Virgin	The CW	Krishna	Shelly Bhalla	Krishna is lesbian and Petra's secretary.
2014–2019	Jane the Virgin	The CW	Adam Alvaro	Tyler Posey	Adam Alvaro is bisexual.
2014–2019	Jane the Virgin	The CW	Jane Ramos	Rosario Dawson	Jane Ramos is openly lesbian and a shady lawyer.
2014–2019	Jane the Virgin	The CW	Petra Andel	Yael Grobglas	Petra Andel is queer.
2014–2019	Jane the Virgin	The CW	Eileen	Elisabeth Röhm	Eileen is lesbian.
2014–2019	Jane the Virgin	The CW	Marlene Donaldson	Melanie Mayron	Marlene Donaldson is lesbian.
2014–2019	Jane the Virgin	The CW	Susanna Barnett	Megan Ketch	Susanna Barnett is lesbian.
2014–2019	Jane the Virgin	The CW	Allison	Iyari Limon	Allison is lesbian.
2014–2019	Jane the Virgin	The CW	Dana	A Leslie Kies	Dana is lesbian.
2014–2019	Jane the Virgin	The CW	Leona	Zelda Williams	Leona is lesbian.
2014–2017	Janet King	ABC1	Janet King	Marta Dusseldorp	Janet King and Ashleigh Larsson are a lesbian couple.
2014–2017	Janet King	ABC1	Ash Larsson	Aimee Pedersen	Ash Larsson is lesbian.
2014–2017	Janet King	ABC1	Bianca Grieve	Anita Hegh	In Season 3, Janet King and Bianca Grieve enter into a relationship.
2014–2017	Kingdom	Audience Network	Nate Kulina	Nick Jonas	Nate Kulina is a closeted gay MMA fighter.
2014–2017	Kingdom	Audience Network	Will	Jonathan Howard	Will is gay and Nate's love interest.
2014–2018	The Last Ship	TNT	Alisha Granderson	Christina Elmore	Alisha Granderson is lesbian.
2014–2018	The Last Ship	TNT	Kelsi Baker	Caitlin Gerard	Kelsi Baker is lesbian.
2014–2018	The Librarians	TNT	Cassandra Killian	Lindy Booth	Cassandra Killian is bisexual.
2014–2015	Looking	HBO	Patrick Murray	Jonathan Groff	Patrick Murray is gay and a video-game developer.
2014–2015	Looking	HBO	Agustín Lanuez	Frankie J. Alvarez	Agustín Lanuez is gay.
2014–2015	Looking	HBO	Dom Basaluzzo	Murray Bartlett	Dom Basaluzzo is gay.
2014–2015	Looking	HBO	Kevin Matheson	Russell Tovey	Kevin Matheson is gay.
2014–2015	Looking	HBO	Ricardo "Richie" Donado Ventura	Raúl Castillo	Ricardo "Richie" Donado Ventura is gay.
2014–2015	Looking	HBO	Frank	O. T. Fagbenle	Frank is gay.
2014–2015	Looking	HBO	Lynn	Scott Bakula	Lynn is gay.
2014–2015	Looking	HBO	Eddie	Daniel Franzese	Eddie is gay.
2014–2019	Madam Secretary	CBS	Blake Moran	Erich Bergen	Blake Moran comes out as bisexual at the end of season 3.
2014–2019	Madam Secretary	CBS	Kat Sandoval	Sara Ramirez	Kat Sandoval is bisexual.
2014–2019	Madam Secretary	CBS	Ali Krieger	Ali Krieger	Ali Krieger is a lesbian. She does a public service announcement for equal pay. She is a member of the World Cup Champion U.S. Women's Soccer team.
2014–2019	Madam Secretary	CBS	Ashlyn Harris	Ashlyn Harris	Ashlyn Harris is a lesbian. She does a public service announcement for equal pay. She is a member of the World Cup Champion U.S. Women's Soccer team.
2014–2019	Madam Secretary	CBS	Maryam Gagulia	Amanda M. Rodriguez	Maryam Gagulia is a lesbian.
2014–2019	Madam Secretary	CBS	Ana Ivanba	Anastasia Baranova	Ana Ivanba is a lesbian.
2014	Matador	El Rey Network	Reyna Flores	Eve Torres	Reyna Flores is a lesbian. She is a sideline news reporter.
2014	Matador	El Rey Network	Silda Patel	Mouzam Makkar	Silda Patel is a lesbian. She is Reyna Flores' secret girlfriend.
2014–2016	The Mysteries of Laura	NBC	Max Carnegie	Max Jenkins	Max Carnegie is gay.
2014–2021	NCIS: New Orleans	CBS	Tammy Gregorio	Vanessa Ferlito	Tammy Gregorio is a lesbian.
2014–2021	NCIS: New Orleans	CBS	Eva Azarova	Cassidy Freeman	Eva Azarova is a lesbian.
2014–2021	NCIS: New Orleans	CBS	Hannah Lee	Meghan Ory	Hannah Lee is a lesbian.
2014–2017	The Night Shift	NBC	Drew Allister	Brendan Fehr	Drew Allister is gay.
2014–2017	The Night Shift	NBC	Rick	Luke Macfarlane	Rick is Drew's boyfriend, introduced in season 1, episode 6 when he is involved in a bus accident.
2014	Nikki & Nora: The N&N Files	YouTube	Nikki Beaumont	Liz Vassey	Nikki Beaumont is a lesbian private detective in New Orleans. She investigates cases with her partner Nora, who is also her lover.
2014	Nikki & Nora: The N&N Files	YouTube	Nora Delaney	Christina Cox	Nora Delaney is a lesbian, and a private investigator. Her partner is Nikki, who is also her lover.
2014–	Nord bei Nordwest	Das Erste	Hannah Wagner	Jana Klinge	Hannah Wagner is lesbian. The police officer arrives in the fictional village Schwanitz to succeed the deceased Lona Vogt. She answers the question of when her husband will come by stating: "I don't have a husband. I like women."
2014–2026	Outlander	Starz	Duke of Sandringham	Simon Callow	The Duke of Sandringham is queer.
2014–2026	Outlander	Starz	Jonathan Randall (aka Black Jack)	Tobias Menzies	Black Jack is queer.
2014–2026	Outlander	Starz	Lord John Grey	David Berry	Lord John Grey is gay.
2014	Øyevitne	NRK	Philip	Axel Bøyum	Philip and Henning are 15-year-old boys secretly in love. After witnessing a murder at a quarry, they vow to never tell anyone in order to keep their relationship a secret.
2014	Øyevitne	NRK	Henning	Odin Waage	Philip and Henning are 15-year-old boys secretly in love. After witnessing a murder at a quarry, they vow to never tell anyone in order to keep their relationship a secret.
2014–2015	Red Band Society	Fox	Sarah Souders	Andrea Parker	Sarah Souders is bisexual.
2014–2015	Red Band Society	Fox	Kenji Gomez-Rejon	Wilson Cruz	Kenji Gomez-Rejon is a gay nurse.
2014–2015	Red Band Society	Fox	Daniella	Tricia O'Kelley	Daniella is a lesbian.
2014	Star-Crossed	The CW	Sophia	Brina Palencia	Sophia is pansexual and has a crush on Taylor.
2014	Star-Crossed	The CW	Nikki	Nicola Correia-Damude	Nikki is lesbian.
2014–2019	Transparent	Amazon Prime Video	Maura Pfefferman	Jeffrey Tambor	Maura Pfefferman is a trans woman. She was killed off in the series finale.
2014–2019	Transparent	Amazon Prime Video	Sarah Pfefferman	Amy Landecker	Sarah Pfefferman is bisexual. She is the oldest of the Pfefferman children.
2014–2019	Transparent	Amazon Prime Video	Tammy Cashman	Melora Hardin	Tammy Cashman is a lesbian.
2014–2019	Transparent	Amazon Prime Video	Sydney Feldman	Carrie Brownstein	Sydney Feldman is bisexual.
2014–2019	Transparent	Amazon Prime Video	Ali Pfefferman	Gaby Hoffmann	Ali Pfefferman is bisexual. Ali is the youngest of the Pfefferman children.
2014–2019	Transparent	Amazon Prime Video	Davina	Alexandra Billings	Davina is a trans woman.
2014–2019	Transparent	Amazon Prime Video	Shea	Trace Lysette	Shea is a trans woman.
2014–2019	Transparent	Amazon Prime Video	Tanta Gittel	Hari Nef	Tanta Gittel is a trans woman.
2014–2019	Transparent	Amazon Prime Video	Leslie Mackinaw	Cherry Jones	Leslie Mackinaw is a lesbian. Leslie was introduced in the second season.
2014–2019	Transparent	Amazon Prime Video	Vicki	Anjelica Huston	Vicki has an emotional sexual relationship with Maura.
2014–2019	Transparent	Amazon Prime Video	Barb	Tig Notaro	Barb is a lesbian. She was a very minor character.
2014–2019	Transparent	Amazon Prime Video	Lila	Alia Shawkat	Lila is bisexual.
2014–2019	Transparent	Amazon Prime Video	Marcy	Bradley Whitford	Marcy is a cross-dresser and went to trans camp, where they were free to express their femininity, with Maura.
2014–2019	Transparent	Amazon Prime Video	Adriana	Hailie Sahar	Adriana is a trans woman.
2014–2019	Transparent	Amazon Prime Video	Carmen	Mariana Marroquin	Carmen is a trans woman.
2014–2019	Transparent	Amazon Prime Video	Eleanor	Zackary Drucker	Eleanor is a trans woman.
2014–2019	Transparent	Amazon Prime Video	Lorena	Harmony Santana	Lorena is a trans woman.
2014–2019	Transparent	Amazon Prime Video	Zelda	Becky Thyre	Zelda is a lesbian.
2014–2019	Transparent	Amazon Prime Video	Celeste	Jill Soloway	Celeste is a lesbian.
2014–2019	Transparent	Amazon Prime Video	Elizah Edwards	Alexandra Grey	Elizah Edwards is a trans woman.
2014–2019	Transparent	Amazon Prime Video	Omar	Rocco Kayiatos	Omar is a trans man.
2014–2019	Transparent	Amazon Prime Video	Bella	Bobbi Salvör Menuez	Bella is a lesbian.
2014–2019	Transparent	Amazon Prime Video	Dale	Ian Harvie	Dale is a trans man.
2014–2019	Transparent	Amazon Prime Video	Pony	Jiz Lee	Pony is queer.
2014–	True Detective	HBO	Paul Woodrugh	Taylor Kitsch	Paul Woodrugh is a closeted gay detective and war veteran (season 2). He had an intimate relationship with a squadmate. He's in relationship with a woman but has to take viagra to have sex with her.
2014–	True Detective	HBO	Tom Purcell	Scoot McNairy	Tom Purcell is gay and closeted. He's the father of two missing children.
2014–2016	Tyrant	FX	Sammy Al-Fayeed	Noah Silver	Sammy Al-Fayeed is gay, living in the fictional Middle Eastern country of Abbudin, where homosexuality is illegal. His boyfriend is killed by ISIS.
2014–2016	Tyrant	FX	Abdul	Mehdi Dehbi	Abdul is a closeted young man whose family has long served as security for the Al-Fayeed family.
2014–2016	Tyrant	FX	Haitham El-Amin	Raphael Acloque	Professor Haitham El-Amin has a secret relationship with Samy.

== 2015 ==
Year	Show	Network	Character	Actor	Notes
2015–2018	12 Monkeys	Syfy	Oliver Peters	Ramon de Ocampo	Oliver Peters is a gay widow. In season 1, episode 10, Oliver makes reference to his dead husband.
2015–2017	American Crime (season 2)	ABC Network	Eric Tanner	Joey Pollari	Eric Tanner is a closeted gay high school basketball player accused of sexual assaulting Taylor Blaine at a party. He is forced to come out after being questioned by the police, by showing them sexually explicit texts between him and Taylor. During one scene in the show Eric says, "I'm gay but I'm not a faggot", which was the first time that word was said on ABC.
2015–2017	American Crime (season 2)	ABC Network	Taylor Blaine	Connor Jessup	Taylor Blaine is a closeted gay teen who accuses members on the high school basketball team of sexually assaulting him, and posting photos of the assault online. He too is forced to come out when Eric reveals the sexually explicit text messages between the two, which show Taylor actually went to the party to hook up with Eric. Meanwhile, Taylor's mom gets the police involved, which Taylor really doesn't want.
2015–2017	American Crime (season 2)	ABC Network	Luke	Taylor John Smith	Luke is gay and shares a passionate kiss with Taylor.
2015–2016	Aquarius	NBC	Charles Manson	Gethin Anthony	Charles Manson is bisexual. He had sex with Ken in exchange for giving him money for living. John McNamara, the creator of the show, said the story about Manson is historical fiction.
2015–2016	Aquarius	NBC	Ken Karn	Brían F. O'Byrne	Ken Karn is gay and came out to his daughter.
2015	Backstrom	Fox	Gregory Valentine	Thomas Dekker	Gregory Valentine is gay, an ex-hustler, and an entrepreneurial crook.
2015	Banana	E4	Freddie Baxter	Freddie Fox	Freddie Baxter is bisexual/pansexual (though it is never named), and is completely "hardwired to fuck", according to actor Freddie Fox.
2015	Banana	E4	Dean Monroe	Fisayo Akinade	Dean Monroe is gay.
2015	Banana	E4	Henry Best	Vincent Franklin	Henry Best is a gay middle-aged insurance salesman, happily settled with his boyfriend of nine years, Lance Sullivan.
2015	Banana	E4	Lance Sullivan	Cyril Nri	Lance Sullivan is gay.
2015	Banana	E4	Vivienne "Scotty" Scott	Letitia Wright	Vivienne "Scotty" Scott is a lesbian.
2015	Banana	E4	Vanessa Moore	Lynn Hunter	Vanessa Moore is a lesbian.
2015	Banana	E4	Sian Moore	Georgia Henshaw	Sian Moore is a lesbian.
2015	Banana	E4	Violet	Hannah John-Kamen	Violet is a lesbian, and likes to party.
2015	Banana	E4	Amy	Charlie Covell	Amy is a neurotic lesbian.
2015	Banana	E4	Helen Brears	Bethany Black	Helen Brears is a trans woman.
2015	Banana	E4	Kay	T'Nia Miller	Kay is a lesbian.
2015–2020	Blindspot	NBC	Bethany Mayfair	Marianne Jean-Baptiste	Bethany Mayfair is a lesbian, and assistant Director In Charge of the FBI's New York Field Office.
2015–2020	Blindspot	NBC	Sofia Varma	Sarita Choudhury	Sophia Varma is a lesbian, and former girlfriend of Bethany. She faked her death.
2015–2020	Blindspot	NBC	Alexandra	Eisa Davis	Alexandra is a lesbian, she was in a relationship with Bethandy until she got stabbed.
2015–2020	Blindspot	NBC	Rich Dotcom	Ennis Esmer	Rich Dotcom is bisexual.
2015–2018	Casual	Hulu	Laura Meyers	Tara Lynne Barr	Laura Meyers is a bisexual teenage girl who is continually exploring her sexual orientation.
2015–2018	Casual	Hulu	Aubrey	Dylan Gelula	Aubrey is bisexual. Her boyfriend is Max, and she has casual sex with Laura.
2015–2018	Casual	Hulu	Tathiana	Lorenza Izzo	Tathiana is a lesbian, and Laura's girlfriend for a while.
2015–2018	Casual	Hulu	Emmy	Eliza Coupe	Emmy is bisexual. Her boyfriend is Alex, and he breaks up with her after discovering she had sex with his sister.
2015–2018	Casual	Hulu	Alyssa	Teri Andrez	Alyssa is bisexual. She was invited for a threesome with Alex and Emmy, but Alex gets cold feet.
2015–	Cheetah In August	Vimeo	August Chandler	Andre Myers	August Chandler struggles to understand his mental condition or sexual power. The series is described as a black gay web series.
2015–2019	Club de Cuervos	Netflix	Aitor Cardoné	Alosian Vivancos	Aitor Cardoné is a pansexual soccer player.
2015–2018	Code Black	CBS	Malaya Pineda	Melanie Chandra	Malaya Pineda is lesbian and a second year resident as of season 2.
2015–2018	Code Black	CBS	Carla Niven	Shiri Appleby	Carla Niven is bisexual and Malaya's former girlfriend.
2015–2018	Code Black	CBS	Noa Kean	Emily Tyra	Noa Kean is bisexual, and works in the ER.
2015	Complications	USA Network	Gretchen Polk	Jessica Szohr	Gretchen Polk is a lesbian.
2015–2019	Crazy Ex-Girlfriend	The CW	White Josh Wilson	David Hull	White Josh is gay.
2015–2019	Crazy Ex-Girlfriend	The CW	Darryl Whitefeather	Pete Gardner	Darryl Whitefeather is bisexual, and in a relationship with White Josh but eventually marries a woman.
2015–2019	Crazy Ex-Girlfriend	The CW	Maya	Esther Povitsky	Maya is bisexual.
2015–2019	Crazy Ex-Girlfriend	The CW	Valencia Perez	Gabrielle Ruiz	Valencia Perez becomes aware that she is bisexual when she starts dating a woman named Beth (Emma Willmann) late in Season 3.
2015	Cucumber	Channel 4	Freddie Baxter	Freddie Fox	Freddie Baxter is bisexual, and is completely "hardwired to fuck", according to actor Freddie Fox.
2015	Cucumber	Channel 4	Dean Monroe	Fisayo Akinade	Dean Monroe is gay.
2015	Cucumber	Channel 4	Henry Best	Vincent Franklin	Henry Best is a gay middle-aged insurance salesman, happily settled with his boyfriend of nine years, Lance Sullivan.
2015	Cucumber	Channel 4	Lance Sullivan	Cyril Nri	Lance Sullivan is gay.
2015	Cucumber	Channel 4	Vivienne "Scotty" Scott	Letitia Wright	Vivienne "Scotty" Scott is a lesbian.
2015	Cucumber	Channel 4	Vanessa Moore	Lynn Hunter	Vanessa Moore is a lesbian.
2015	Cucumber	Channel 4	Sian Moore	Georgia Henshaw	Sian Moore is a lesbian.
2015	Cucumber	Channel 4	Violet	Hannah John-Kamen	Violet is a lesbian, and likes to party.
2015	Cucumber	Channel 4	Amy	Charlie Covell	Amy is a neurotic lesbian.
2015	Cucumber	Channel 4	Helen Brears	Bethany Black	Helen Brears is a trans woman.
2015	Cucumber	Channel 4	Kay	T'Nia Miller	Kay is a lesbian.
2015	Cuffs	BBC One	Jake Vickers	Jacob Ifan	Jake Vickers is gay.
2015	Cuffs	BBC One	Simon Reddington	Andrew Hawley	Simon Reddington is gay.
2015	Cuffs	BBC One	Donna Prager	Eleanor Matsuura	Donna Prager is a lesbian.
2015	Cuffs	BBC One	Alice Gove	Pippa Nixon	Alice Gove is a lesbian.
2015–2017	Dark Matter	Syfy	Two	Melissa O'Neil	Two is bisexual.
2015–2017	Dark Matter	Syfy	Dr. Irena Shaw	Zoie Palmer	Irena Shaw is a lesbian.
2015	Deutschland 83	RTL Television; SundanceTV	Alexander Edel	Ludwig Trepte	Alexander Edel is the rebellious son of General Edel and has sex with Tobias.
2015	Deutschland 83	RTL Television; SundanceTV	Tobias Tischbier	Alexander Beyer	Tobias Tischbier is gay and works as a professor at the University of Bonn.
2015	Deutschland 83	RTL Television; SundanceTV	Felix von Schwerin	Florian Bartholomäi	Felix von Schwerin is gay.
2015	Dig	USA	Detective Golan Cohen	Ori Pfeffer	Detective Golan Cohen is a gay detective. He lives with his son and with Udi.
2015	Dig	USA	Udi	Tsahi Halevi	Udi is Golan's boyfriend.
2015–2018	È arrivata la felicità	Rai 1	Valeria Camilli	Giulia Bevilacqua	Valeria Camilli and Rita Nardelli are lesbians.
2015–2018	È arrivata la felicità	Rai 1	Rita Nardelli	Federica De Cola	Valeria Camilli and Rita Nardelli are lesbians.
2015–2020	Empire	Fox	Jamal Lyon	Jussie Smollett	Jamal Lyon is gay, he is the middle son of the Lyon family, and a talented singer-songwriter.
2015–2020	Empire	Fox	Michael Sanchez	Rafael de la Fuente	Michael Sanchez is gay and Jamal's ex-boyfriend.
2015–2020	Empire	Fox	Tiana Brown	Serayah McNeill	Tiana Brown is bisexual.
2015–2020	Empire	Fox	India Spring	Elizabeth Whitson	India Spring is lesbian, and had an affair with Tiana Brown.
2015–2020	Empire	Fox	Ryan Morgan	Eka Darville	Ryan Morgan is an openly gay filmmaker. He hooks up with Jamal.
2015–2020	Empire	Fox	Mimi Whiteman	Marisa Tomei	Mimi Whiteman is a lesbian.
2015–2020	Empire	Fox	D-Major (aka Derek)	Tobias Truvillion	D-Major is Jamal Lyon's secret lover. He is a music producer.
2015–2020	Empire	Fox	Tory Ash	Rumer Willis	Tory Ash was flirting and soaking in a hot tub with Tiana.
2015–2020	Empire	Fox	Rhonda Lyon	Kaitlin Doubleday	Rhonda Lyon is bisexual.
2015–2020	Empire	Fox	Freda Gatz	Bre-Z	Freda Gatz is a lesbian.
2015–2020	Empire	Fox	Melody Barnes	Alexandra Grey	Melody Barnes is a trans woman. She is the victim of transphobia when Lucious finds out she is transgender, and he refuses to let her sing.
2015–2020	Empire	Fox	Camilla Marks-Whiteman	Naomi Campbell	Camilla Marks-Whiteman is bisexual.
2015–2022	The Expanse	SyFy; Amazon Prime Video	Anna Volovodov	Elizabeth Mitchell	Anna Volovodov is a lesbian and has a wife and daughter.
2015–2022	The Expanse	SyFy; Amazon Prime Video	Julie Mao	Florence Faivre	Julie Mao is pansexual, according to her dating profile.
2015–2022	The Expanse	SyFy; Amazon Prime Video	Camina Drummer	Cara Gee	Camina Drummer is pansexual.
2015–2022	The Expanse	SyFy; Amazon Prime Video	Oksana	Sandrine Holt	Oksana is pansexual.
2015–2022	The Expanse	SyFy; Amazon Prime Video	Namono Volovodov	Raven Dauda	Namono Volovodov is a lesbian.
2015	Eye Candy	MTV	Connor North	John Garet Stoker	Connor North is gay and dates Oliver in Season 1.
2015	Eye Candy	MTV	Oliver	Parker Pogue	Connor North is gay and dates Oliver in Season 1.
2015–2023	Fear The Walking Dead	AMC Studios	Victor Strand	Colman Domingo	Victor Strand and Thomas Abigail are gay and were in a relationship.
2015–2023	Fear The Walking Dead	AMC Studios	Thomas Abigail	Dougray Scott	Victor Strand and Thomas Abigail are gay and were in a relationship.
2015–2023	Fear The Walking Dead	AMC Studios	Althea ("Al") Szewczek-Przygocki	Maggie Grace	Althea ("Al") Szewczek-Przygocki is lesbian.
2015–2023	Fear The Walking Dead	AMC Studios	Isabelle	Sydney Lemmon	Isabelle is lesbian.
2015	Flesh and Bones	Starz	Paul Grayson	Ben Daniels	Paul Grayson is bisexual.
2015	Flesh and Bones	Starz	Trey	Karell Williams	Trey is gay.
2015	Flesh and Bones	Starz	Eduardo	Anthony Lee Medina	Eduardo is a rent boy.
2015–2019	Glitch	ABC1	Charlie Thompson	Sean Keenan	Charlie Thompson is gay and one of the characters who rises from the dead with no memory. Through a series of flashbacks he regains his memory and we learn that he was in love and in a relationship with one of his fellow soldiers.
2015–2019	Glitch	ABC1	Gay Man #1	Nick Hedger	Gay Man #1, Gay Man #2, Gay Older Man; characters that appeared in season 3, episode "First Times".
2015–2019	Glitch	ABC1	Gay Man #2	Ben Nicholson	Gay Man #1, Gay Man #2, Gay Older Man; characters that appeared in season 3, episode "First Times".
2015–2019	Glitch	ABC1	Gay Older Man	Damian Oehme	Gay Man #1, Gay Man #2, Gay Older Man; characters that appeared in season 3, episode "First Times".
2015	Home Fires	ITV	Teresa Fenchurch	Leanne Best	Teresa Fenchurch is a closeted lesbian.
2015	Home Fires	ITV	Connie Ward	Rachael Elizabeth	Connie Ward is a lesbian and died on a ship sunk by German U-boats.
2015–2018	Humans (aka HUM∀NS)	Channel 4	Niska	Emily Berrington	Niska is pansexual, and a synth (synthetic human). She falls in love with Astrid who is a human.
2015–2018	Humans (aka HUM∀NS)	Channel 4	Astrid	Bella Dayne	Astrid is bisexual, and falls in love with Synth Niska.
2015–2019	Into the Badlands	AMC	Tilda	Ally Ioannides	Tilda is queer. Her brief love interest is Odessa.
2015–2019	Into the Badlands	AMC	Odessa	Maddison Jaizani	Odessa is a lesbian, and has a brief relationship with Tilda.
2015–2019	Jessica Jones	Netflix	Jeri Hogarth	Carrie-Anne Moss	Jeri Hogarth is lesbian. In season 2, she finds out that she has ALS and deals with the diagnosis by having an orgy with female sex workers.
2015–2019	Jessica Jones	Netflix	Wendy Ross-Hogarth	Robin Weigert	Wendy Ross-Hogarth is lesbian and Jeri's wife. They are divorcing.
2015–2019	Jessica Jones	Netflix	Pam	Susie Abromeit	Pam is lesbian, and Jeri's assistant and mistress.
2015–2019	Jessica Jones	Netflix	Kith Lyonne	Sarita Choudhury	Kith Lyonne is bisexual.
2015–2019	Jessica Jones	Netflix	Gillian	Aneesh Sheth	Gillian is a trans woman, and Jessica's tough as nails assistant. Gillian is portrayed by an openly trans actress.
2015–2019	Jessica Jones	Netflix	Inez Green	Leah Gibson	Inez Green is bisexual.
2015–2019	Jessica Jones	Netflix	Wendy Ross-Hogarth	Robin Weigert	Wendy Ross-Hogarth is a lesbian, and Jeri's ex-wife.
2015–2019	Jessica Jones	Netflix	Makayla	Cece King	Makayla is a bisexual sex worker.
2015–2019	Jessica Jones	Netflix	Pam	Susie Abromeit	Pam is a lesbian, and Jeri's former lover.
2015–2019	Killjoys	Space; SyFy	Prima "Pree" Dezz	Thom Allison	Prima "Pree" Dezz is gay, and promoted to governor.
2015–2019	Killjoys	Space; SyFy	Kendry Delle Seyah	Mayko Nguyen	Kendry Delle Seyah is a lesbian.
2015–2019	Killjoys	Space; SyFy	Aneela Kin Ritt	Hannah John-Kamen	Aneela Kin Ritt is a lesbian.
2015–2019	Killjoys	Space; SyFy	Dutch	Hannah John-Kamen	Dutch is pansexual.
2015	London Spy	BBC Two	Danny Holt	Ben Whishaw	Danny Holt is gay, and a warehouse worker. Alex is his boyfriend, until he is found dead.
2015	London Spy	BBC Two	Alex	Edward Holcroft	Alex is a gay spy, and Danny's boyfriend. He is found dead locked in a trunk.
2015	London Spy	BBC Two	Scottie	Jim Broadbent	Scottie is gay, and Danny's best friend. He scolds Alex for being secretive all the time.
2015–2020	The Magicians	Syfy	Eliot Waugh	Hale Appleman	Eliot Waugh is a gay king of a fantasy realm.
2015–2020	The Magicians	Syfy	Quentin Coldwater	Jason Ralph	Quentin Coldwater is bisexual. He slept with Eliot and Margo.
2015–2020	The Magicians	Syfy	Dark King	Sean Maguire	The Dark King is gay.
2015–2020	The Magicians	Syfy	Margo Hanson	Summer Bishil	Margo Hanson is bisexual.
2015–2020	The Magicians	Syfy	Marina Andrieski	Kacey Rohl	Marina Andrieski is lesbian.
2015–2021	Master of None	Netflix	Denise	Lena Waithe	Denise is the lesbian best friend of main character Dev.
2015–2021	Master of None	Netflix	Alicia	Naomi Ackie	Alicia is Denise's wife.
2015–2018	Merlí	TV3	Bruno	David Solans	Bruno is gay and hasn't come out of the closet. He is in love with Pol, with whom he made out at a party.
2015–2018	Merlí	TV3	Oliver	Iñaki Mur	Oliver is gay.
2015–2018	Merlí	TV3	Pol	Carlos Cuevas	Pol's sexual preference has been questioned In the second season Bruno and Pol have sex.
2015–2018	Merlí	TV3	Quima	Manel Barceló	Quima is a trans woman.
2015–2019	Mr. Robot	USA Network	Gideon Goddard	Michel Gill	Gideon Goddard is gay, and the boss of the main character, Elliot.
2015–2019	Mr. Robot	USA Network	Tyrell Wellick	Martin Wallström	Tyrell Wellick is bisexual and sleeps with Anwar Raziz.
2015–2019	Mr. Robot	USA Network	Whiterose	BD Wong	Whiterose, the leader of a hacking collective, is a transgender woman.
2015–2019	Mr. Robot	USA Network	Harry Davis	Randy Harrison	Harry Davis is gay and Gideon's partner.
2015–2019	Mr. Robot	USA Network	Anwar Raziz	Mitchell Winter	Anwar Raziz is gay.
2015–2019	Mr. Robot	USA Network	Carla	Eve Lindley	Carla is transgender.
2015–2019	Mr. Robot	USA Network	Dominique DiPierro	Grace Gummer	Dominique DiPierro is lesbian, and an FBI agent.
2015–2019	Mr. Robot	USA Network	Darlene Alderson	Carly Chaikin	Darlene Alderson is bisexual, and a computer programmer and hacker.
2015–2017	Narcos	Netflix	Hélmer "Pacho" Herrera	Alberto Ammann	Hélmer "Pacho" Herrera is a gay Colombian drug lord.
2015	Olympus	Syfy	Prince Lykos	Wade Burns	Prince Lykos is gay. Kimon is his lover.
2015	Olympus	Syfy	Kimon	Levi Meaden	Kimon is gay and Prince Lykos' scribe and lover.
2015	Olympus	Syfy	Adriadne	Sophia Lauchlin Hirt	Adriadne is bisexual.
2015–2018	The Path	Hulu	Hawk Lane	Kyle Allen	In the third season, Hawk Lane is sexually involved with a closeted gay Christian youth named Caleb Matthews.
2015–2018	The Path	Hulu	Caleb Matthews	Titus Makin Jr.	Caleb Matthews is gay, and has a relationship with Hawk Lane.
2015–2018	The Path	Hulu	Mary Cox	Emma Greenwell	Mary Cox is bisexual.
2015–2018	The Path	Hulu	Betsy	Whitney Crowder	Betsy is a lesbian.
2015–2018	Quantico	ABC	Elias Harper	Rick Cosnett	Elias Harper is an openly gay intelligence analyst trainee at the FBI Academy.
2015–2018	Quantico	ABC	Hannah Wyland	Eliza Coupe	Hannah Wyland is bisexual and is Ryan Booth's ex-wife.
2015–2018	Quantico	ABC	Harry Doyle	Russell Tovey	Harry Doyle is an openly gay MI6 agent and CIA trainee.
2015–2018	Quantico	ABC	Will Olsen	Jay Armstrong Johnson	Will Olsen is a gay computer hacker.
2015–2018	Quantico	ABC	Sebastian Chen	David Lim	Sebastian Chen is gay.
2015	The Returned	A&E; Netflix	Dr. Julie Han	Sandrine Holt	Dr. Julie Han is a lesbian.
2015	The Returned	A&E; Netflix	Deputy Nikki Banks	Agnes Bruckner	Nikki Banks is a lesbian.
2015	River	BBC One, Netflix	Jordy Merton	Julian Lewis Jones	Jordy and Sasha had a secret relationship.
2015	River	BBC One, Netflix	Sasha Mischenko	Alec Utgoff	Jordy and Sasha had a secret relationship.
2015–2017	Rosewood	FOX	Pippy Rosewood	Gabrielle Dennis	Pippy Rosewood is a lesbian. She has a relationship with TMI (Tara Milly Izikoff).
2015–2017	Rosewood	FOX	Tara Milly Izikoff	Anna Konkle	Tara Milly Izikoff is bisexual, and in a relationship with Pippy.
2015–2017	Rosewood	FOX	Cassie	Tia Mowry	Cassie is a lesbian, and Pippy's ex-girlfriend.
2015–2018	The Royals	E!	Eleanor Henstridge	Alexandra Park	Eleanor Henstridge is bisexual, and formerly involved with her bodyguard, Jasper.
2015–2018	The Royals	E!	Samantha Cook	Sarah Dumont	Samantha Cook is bisexual and ex-girlfriend of Jasper.
2015–2018	Sense8	Netflix	Wolfgang Bogdanow	Max Riemelt	Wolfgang Bogdanow is bisexual.
2015–2018	Sense8	Netflix	Sun Bak	Doona Bae	Sun Bak is pansexual.
2015–2018	Sense8	Netflix	Nomi Marks	Jamie Clayton	Nomi Marks is a pansexual trans woman.
2015–2018	Sense8	Netflix	Kala Dandekar	Tina Desai	Kala Dandekar is pansexual.
2015–2018	Sense8	Netflix	Riley Blue	Tuppence Middleton	Riley Blue is pansexual.
2015–2018	Sense8	Netflix	Capheus Onyango	Aml Ameen (season 1) Toby Onwumere (season 2)	Capheus Onyango is bisexual.
2015–2018	Sense8	Netflix	Lito Rodriguez	Miguel Angel Silvestre	Lito Rodriguez is gay.
2015–2018	Sense8	Netflix	Will Gorski	Brian J. Smith	Will Gorski is bisexual.
2015–2018	Sense8	Netflix	Hernando	Alfonso Herrera	Hernando is gay and Lito's boyfriend.
2015–2018	Sense8	Netflix	Amanita Caplan	Freema Agyeman	Amanita Caplan is bisexual and Nomi's girlfriend.
2015–2018	Sense8	Netflix	Raoul Pasquale	Erik Hayser	Raoul Pasquale is Lito's first gay lover.
2015–2018	Sense8	Netflix	Zakia Asalache	Mumbi Maina	Zakia Asalache is pansexual.
2015–2018	Sense8	Netflix	Angelica Turing	Daryl Hannah	Angelica Turing is pansexual.
2015–2018	Sense8	Netflix	Lila Facchini	Valeria Bilello	Lila Facchini is pansexual.
2015–2018	Sense8	Netflix	Bodhi	Sarah Kants	Bodhi is pansexual.
2015–2018	Sense8	Netflix	George	Arly Jover	George is a lesbian.
2015–2018	Sense8	Netflix	Sara Patrell	Margot Thorne	Sara Patrell is pansexual.
2015–2018	Sense8	Netflix	Carol Cumberland	Janet Ulrich Brooks	Carol Cumberland is pansexual.
2015–2018	Sense8	Netflix	The Mother	Ursula Jones	The Mother is pansexual.
2015–2017	Skam	NRK	Eskild Tryggvasson	Carl Martin Eggesbø	Eskild Tryggvasson is gay.
2015–2017	Skam	NRK	Isak Valtersen	Tarjei Sandvik Moe	Isak Valtersen is gay.
2015–2017	Skam	NRK	Even Bech Næsheim	Henrik Holm	Even Bech Næsheim is gay.
2015–2017	Stitchers	Freeform	Camille Engelson	Allison Scagliotti	Camille Engelson is bisexual.
2015–2017	Stitchers	Freeform	Amanda Weston	Anna Akana	Amanda Weston is a lesbian.
2015–2021	Supergirl	The CW	Alex Danvers	Chyler Leigh	Alex Danvers comes out as a lesbian. She is the adopted sister of Kara Danvers.
2015–2021	Supergirl	The CW	Maggie Sawyer	Floriana Lima	Maggie Sawyer is a lesbian and a police detective.
2015–2021	Supergirl	The CW	Nia Nal (Dreamer)	Nicole Maines	Nia Nal is a transgender woman working at CatCO.
2015–2021	Supergirl	The CW	Kelly Olsen	Azie Tesfai	Kelly Olsen is a lesbian.
2015–2016	This Life	CBC	Oliver Lawson	Kristopher Turner	Oliver Lawson is gay and the brother of the main character.
2015–	Unforgotten	ITV	Eric Slater	Tom Courtenay	Eric Slater is bisexual.
2015–	Unforgotten	ITV	Jimmy Sullivan	Harley Alexander-Sule	Jimmy Sullivan was Eric's gay lover.
2015–	Unforgotten	ITV	Colin Osborne	Mark Bonnar	Colin Osborne is gay.
2015–	Unforgotten	ITV	Simon Osborne	Charlie Condou	Simon Osborne is gay and Colin's husband.
2015–2018	UnREAL	Lifetime	Jay	Jeffrey Bowyer-Chapman	Jay is a gay TV producer.
2015–2018	UnREAL	Lifetime	Faith	Breeda Wool	Faith is a lesbian.
2015–2018	UnREAL	Lifetime	Alexi Petrov	Alex Sparrow	Alexi Petrov is gay.
2015–2018	UnREAL	Lifetime	Xavier	Jaime Callica	Xavier is gay.
2015–2018	UnREAL	Lifetime	Fiona	Tracie Thoms	Fiona is a lesbian.
2015–2018	Versailles	Canal+	Philippe d'Orléans	Alexander Vlahos	Philippe d'Orléans is gay.
2015–2018	Versailles	Canal+	Chevalier de Lorraine	Evan Williams	Chevalier de Lorraine is gay.
2015–2016	Wayward Pines	FOX	Frank Armstrong	Michael Garza	Frank Armstrong is gay.
2015–2020	Westside	TV3	Bjelke "Bilkey" van Heeder	Todd Emerson	Bjelke "Bilkey" van Heeder is gay.
2015	You, Me and the Apocalypse	Sky 1	Scotty McNeil	Kyle Soller	Scotty McNeil is gay.
2015	You, Me and the Apocalypse	Sky 1	Arnold Gaines	Paterson Joseph	Arnold Gaines is gay.
2015–2021	Younger	TV Land	Maggie	Debi Mazar	Maggie is lesbian.
2015–2021	Younger	TV Land	Lauren Heller	Molly Bernard	Lauren Heller is lesbian.

== See also ==
- List of lesbian characters in television
- List of gay characters in television
- List of bisexual characters in television
- List of transgender characters in television
- List of BL dramas
- Lists of dramatic television series with LGBT characters
- List of fictional asexual characters
- List of fictional intersex characters
- List of fictional non-binary characters
- List of fictional pansexual characters
- List of animated series with LGBT characters
- List of comedy television series with LGBT characters
- List of horror television series with LGBT characters
- List of made-for-television films with LGBT characters
- List of news and information television programs featuring LGBT subjects
- List of reality television programs with LGBT cast members
- List of LGBT characters in radio and podcasts
- List of LGBT characters in soap operas

== Sources ==
- Where We Are on TV: 2007–2008 (PDF) (Report). GLAAD. 2007. Archived from the original (PDF) on March 25, 2020.
- Where We Are on TV: 2013-2014 (PDF) (Report). GLAAD. 2013. Archived from the original (PDF) on March 28, 2020.
- Where We Are on TV: 2015-2016 (PDF) (Report). GLAAD. 2015. Archived from the original (PDF) on February 15, 2020.
- Where We Are on TV: 2016-2017 (PDF) (Report). GLAAD. 2016. Archived from the original (PDF) on January 1, 2020.
