= Blue Eyes (TV series) =

Swedish political drama television series

- Also known as: Blå ögon
- Genre: Political drama
- Created by: Alex Haridi
- Written by: Alex Haridi
- Starring: Louise Peterhoff; Linus Wahlgren; Sven Nordin; Adam Lundgren
- Theme music composer: Fleshquartet
- Country of origin: Sweden
- Original language: Swedish
- No. of seasons: 1
- No. of episodes: 10

Production
- Running time: 58 minutes

Original release
- Release: 30 November 2014 – 2015

Blue Eyes (original title Blå ögon) is a Swedish political drama television series created by Alex Haridi. The programme focuses on two female leads against the backdrop of the rise of a far right political party, Trygghetspartiet (English: the Security Party.)

Haridi's inspiration for the show came from election gains made by the Sweden Democrats and from shows such as The Wire and Homeland. The show was a ratings success, attracting over 1 million viewers in Sweden.

Critics considered the Security Party to be too similar to the Swedish Democrats, leading to complaints to the broadcasting regulator.

As Blue Eyes – and with English subtitles – the series was available on demand from Channel 4 TV as part of its Walter Presents service and occupied the Friday 9 p.m. slot on Channel 4's More 4 channel during April and May 2016. It was also broadcast in Australia on SBS. The series was released on home video (DVD and Blu-ray) in Sweden in 2015, and on DVD in the United Kingdom.
