= Adam Lundgren =

Swedish actor (born 1986)

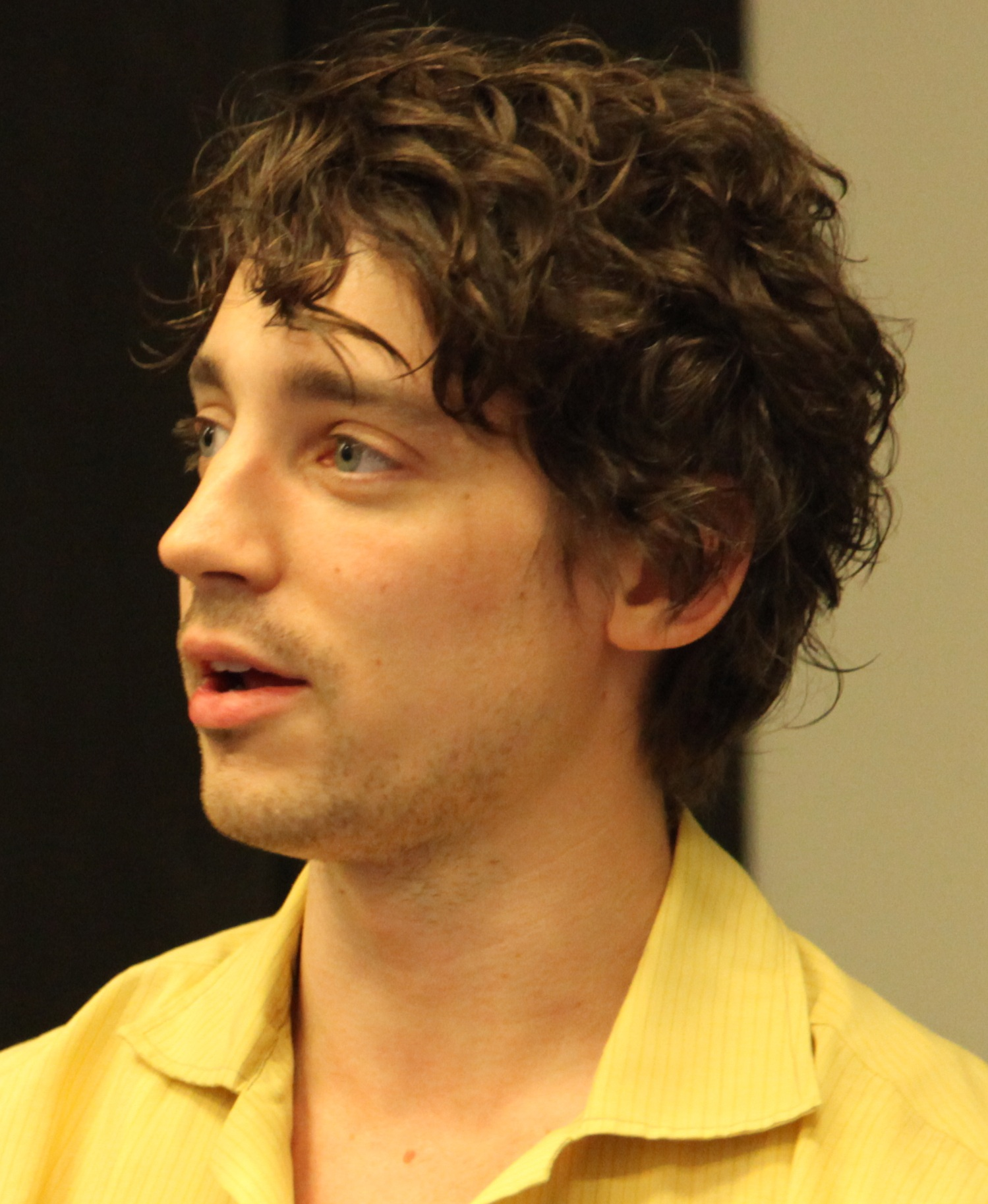
- Lundgren at press conference 2012 for Shed No Tears
- Born: 15 February 1986 (age 40); Gothenburg, Sweden
- Occupation: Actor
- Years active: 2004 – present
- Notable work: Benjamin in Don't Ever Wipe Tears Without Gloves; Pål in Shed No Tears; Peter Löwander in Vår tid är nu.

Adam Reier Lundgren (born 15 February 1986 in Gothenburg) is a Swedish actor. He is best known internationally for starring in the television series Torka aldrig tårar utan handskar (Don't Ever Wipe Tears Without Gloves) in 2012, Blå ögon (Blue Eyes) in 2014 and Vår tid är nu (in english known as The Restaurant) (2017-2019). In the latter successful SVT series he plays restaurant-owner Peter Löwander.

== Career ==
Lundgren studied at The Academy of Music and Drama in Gothenburg in 2009–2012. Although he was a junior hockey player for many years, he abandoned his hockey ambitions in favour of acting at the age of 16. In 2013, he won the Rising Star award at the Stockholm International Film Festival.

In 2014, he appeared as neo-Nazi Mattias in SVT's political thriller Blå ögon. It was broadcast in the UK between April and May 2016 on More 4 and made available on demand on the All 4 portal as part of its Walter Presents world drama offering.

== Filmography ==
- 2005 – Storm
- 2005 – Sandor slash Ida
- 2007 – Ciao Bella
- 2007 – Pirret
- 2007 – Linas kvällsbok
- 2008 – LOVE/My name is Love (short film)
- 2008 – Höök (TV series)
- 2008 – Oskyldigt dömd (TV series)
- 2009 – 183 dagar (TV series)
- 2009 – Maud och Leo
- 2009 – Främmande land
- 2010 – Olycksfågeln (TV film)
- 2010 – Fyra år till
- 2010 – Apflickorna
- 2011 – Irene Huss - Tystnadens cirkel
- 2011 – Anno 1790 (TV series)
- 2012 – Bitchkram
- 2012 – Don't Ever Wipe Tears Without Gloves (TV series)
- 2013 – Din barndom ska aldrig dö
- 2013 – Känn ingen sorg
- 2014 – Blå ögon (TV series)
- 2017 – Vår tid är nu
- 2019 – Chernobyl
- 2022 – Clark
- 2024 - Whiskey on the Rocks
- 2025 – The Ugly Stepsister
