= Marie-Lou Nahhas =

Lebanese-American actress, model and activist

- Born: Beirut, Lebanon
- Education: University of Pittsburgh (BS); Duquesne University (MPH)
- Occupations: Actress, model

Marie-Lou Nahhas (Arabic: ماري لو نحاس; is a Lebanese American actress, model, and activist best known for playing Egyptian-born inmate Shani Abboud on season 7 of Orange Is the New Black. Season 7 aired on Netflix in July 2019.

She was a finalist for Miss Lebanon 2012. In August 2020, Nahhas appeared on the cover of Marie Claire Arabia.

Marie-Lou is fluent in French, English, Arabic, and Spanish.

== Activism ==
After earning her master's degree, Nahhas moved to New York City to pursue her acting career professionally in theatre and film.

- In 2019, it was announced that Nahhas would be participating in Dubai's STEP Conference 2020, a tech festival for start-ups, finance, and entrepreneurship. She is set to speak as part of the conference's speakers line-up.
- Nahhas is vocal about ending female genital mutilation, visiting with victims in Africa, particularly in Ethiopia’s Afar region, with the United Nations Population Fund and posting regularly on her social media about positive progress made to eliminate the practice. Nahhas's character on Orange Is the New Black, Shani, was a victim of female genital mutilation.

== Personal life ==
Nahhas speaks English, French, Spanish, and Arabic.

== Filmography ==
=== Film ===
Year	Title	Role	Notes
2015	Southpaw	Mrs. Miguel	Uncredited
2016	Craig Quits His Day Job	Nadia	
2021	Beity (short)		

=== Television ===
Year	Title	Role	Notes
2018	The Looming Tower	Muslim Woman	Episode: "Y2K"
2019	Madam Secretary	Interpreter	Episode: "Proxy War"
2019	Orange Is the New Black	Shani Abboud	8 episodes
2019	Awake	Rita	
