= Don't Ever Wipe Tears Without Gloves =

2012 Swedish television series directed by Simon Kaijser da Silva

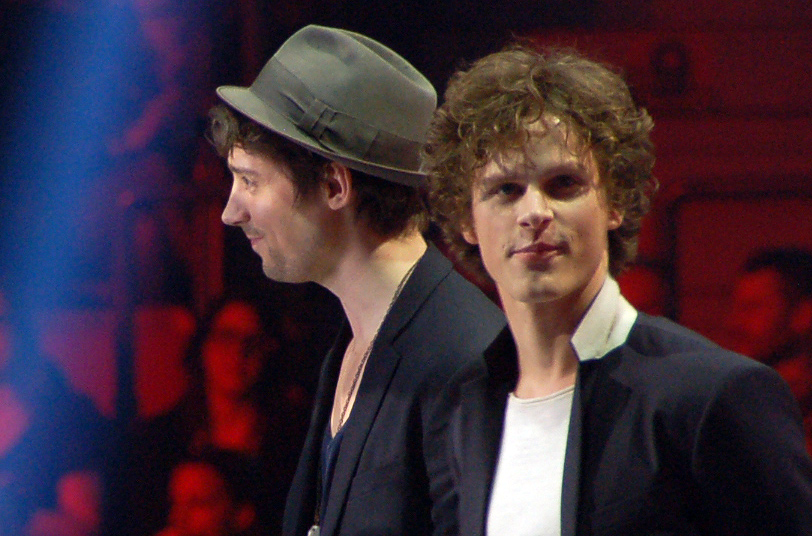
- Adam Lundgren and Adam Pålsson, the lead actors
- Swedish: Torka aldrig tårar utan handskar
- Genre: Drama
- Based on: Torka aldrig tårar utan handskar by Jonas Gardell
- Screenplay by: Jonas Gardell
- Directed by: Simon Kaijser
- Starring: Adam Lundgren; Adam Pålsson; Simon J. Berger
- Narrated by: Björn Kjellman
- Theme music composer: Andreas Mattsson
- Country of origin: Sweden
- Original language: Swedish
- No. of episodes: 3

Production
- Producer: Maria Nordenberg
- Cinematography: Stefan Kullänger
- Editors: Agneta Scherman; Simon Kaijser
- Running time: 58 min
- Production company: Sveriges Television

Original release
- Network: SVT1
- Release: 8 October – 22 October 2012

Don't Ever Wipe Tears Without Gloves (Swedish: Torka aldrig tårar utan handskar) is a 2012 three-part Swedish TV drama about the impact of AIDS in Stockholm's gay community in the early 1980s. It is based on the Swedish novelist Jonas Gardell's trilogy with the same name, with each episode covering one of the three novels that are subtitled Love, Disease and Death.

The three-part drama was produced by Sveriges Television, and aired the first time on SVT1 on 8, 15 and 22 October 2012.

In September 2013, it was announced that the BBC had bought the series, and the first episode was aired on BBC Four on 2 December 2013 to mark World AIDS Day.

== Episodes ==
Episode 1, "Love" (Kärleken), focuses on the 19-year-old Rasmus (Adam Pålsson), who after graduation moves from rural Värmland to Stockholm to attend university. As soon as he arrives in Stockholm, he begins to seek out the gay community, where he meets and befriends Paul (Simon J. Berger). At a Christmas dinner party in Paul's apartment, he eventually meets Benjamin (Adam Lundgren), a young man who is struggling to come to terms with his homosexuality and faith as a Jehovah's Witness. Interspersed with the main narrative, there are scenes of Rasmus as a child and the dying Rasmus.

An early scene in the episode shows two nurses dressed in heavy-duty bio-protective clothing in the early 1980s caring for Reine (Kristoffer Berglund); suffering from AIDS. As the nurses tend the pained man, one nurse wipes a tear from his eye, which leads to the second nurse rebuking her afterwards with the sentence that is the title of the series: "Don't ever wipe tears without gloves", reflecting the fear surrounding AIDS at the time.

Episode 2, "Disease" (Sjukdomen), focuses on the relationship between Rasmus and Benjamin after they have moved in together. AIDS has started to spread among their friends, and eventually it also reaches them. When Rasmus is found to be HIV-positive, Benjamin finally decides to tell his parents and church elders that he is homosexual, in order to fully support Rasmus. This leads him to being shunned by the church, and forces his parents to stop all contact if they want to remain in the congregation.

Episode 3, "Death" (Döden), deals mainly with the deaths of Paul and Rasmus through AIDS. While Paul's funeral is made into a splendid opera, just like his life, Rasmus's parents refuse to accept Benjamin's request concerning Rasmus's funeral, although they had been deeply in love and Benjamin had remained by Rasmus's side throughout. This episode also includes some reflections by the surviving Benjamin over 20 years later.

== Main cast ==
- Adam Lundgren as Benjamin
- Adam Pålsson as Rasmus
- Simon J. Berger as Paul
- Emil Almén as Seppo
- Michael Jonsson as Lars-Åke
- Christoffer Svensson as Bengt
- Kristoffer Berglund as Reine
- Annika Olsson as Rasmus's mother
- Stefan Sauk as Rasmus's father
- Marie Richardson as Benjamin's mother
- Gerhard Hoberstorfer as Benjamin's father
- Ulf Friberg as Holger
- Björn Kjellman as the narrator / Benjamin, present
- Jonathan Eriksson as Benjamin, 7 years old
- Claes Hartelius as Ove
- Belle Weiths as Benjamin's sister, 5 years old
- Gorm Rembe-Nylander as Rasmus, 7 years old
- Alexi Carpentieri as '80s dude
- Lisa Linnertorp as Elisabeth
- Maria Langhammer as nurse
- Sanna Sundqvist as Madde
- Jennie Silfverhjelm as Rasmus's doctor
- Julia Sporre as Benjamin's sister, 17 years old

== Reception ==
In Sweden, the drama had a 34% audience share, and received good reviews from the Swedish media. It is credited with raising awareness of HIV and AIDS within Swedish society and has been praised by members of the LGBT community for its depiction of how the AIDS crisis affected Stockholm in the 1980s.

Following the BBC broadcast, Time Out London rated the first episode at 4 out of 5 stars, asking readers to look past the series' name. The Daily Telegraph gave the series opener 4 out of 5 stars in a review, praising the shooting and the use of symbolism. The Independent's Ellen E. Jones compared the series with the American miniseries Angels in America in regard to the spread and reaction to HIV/AIDS in the 1980s, finding the series' zeitgeist and character portraits to be strong, though the bildungsroman at the centre of the plot and generic characters were less inventive.

== Awards ==
- In May 2013, Don't Ever Wipe Tears Without Gloves won the Audience Award at the annual Series Mania Festival in Paris.
- On 30 August 2013, Don't Ever Wipe Tears Without Gloves won the award Best TV drama at the Swedish Television Award, Kristallen (The Crystal).
- The drama was also nominated for the Prix Europa 2013.

== See also ==
- LGBT rights in Sweden
