= Simon J. Berger =

Swedish actor (born 1979)

Simon Berger
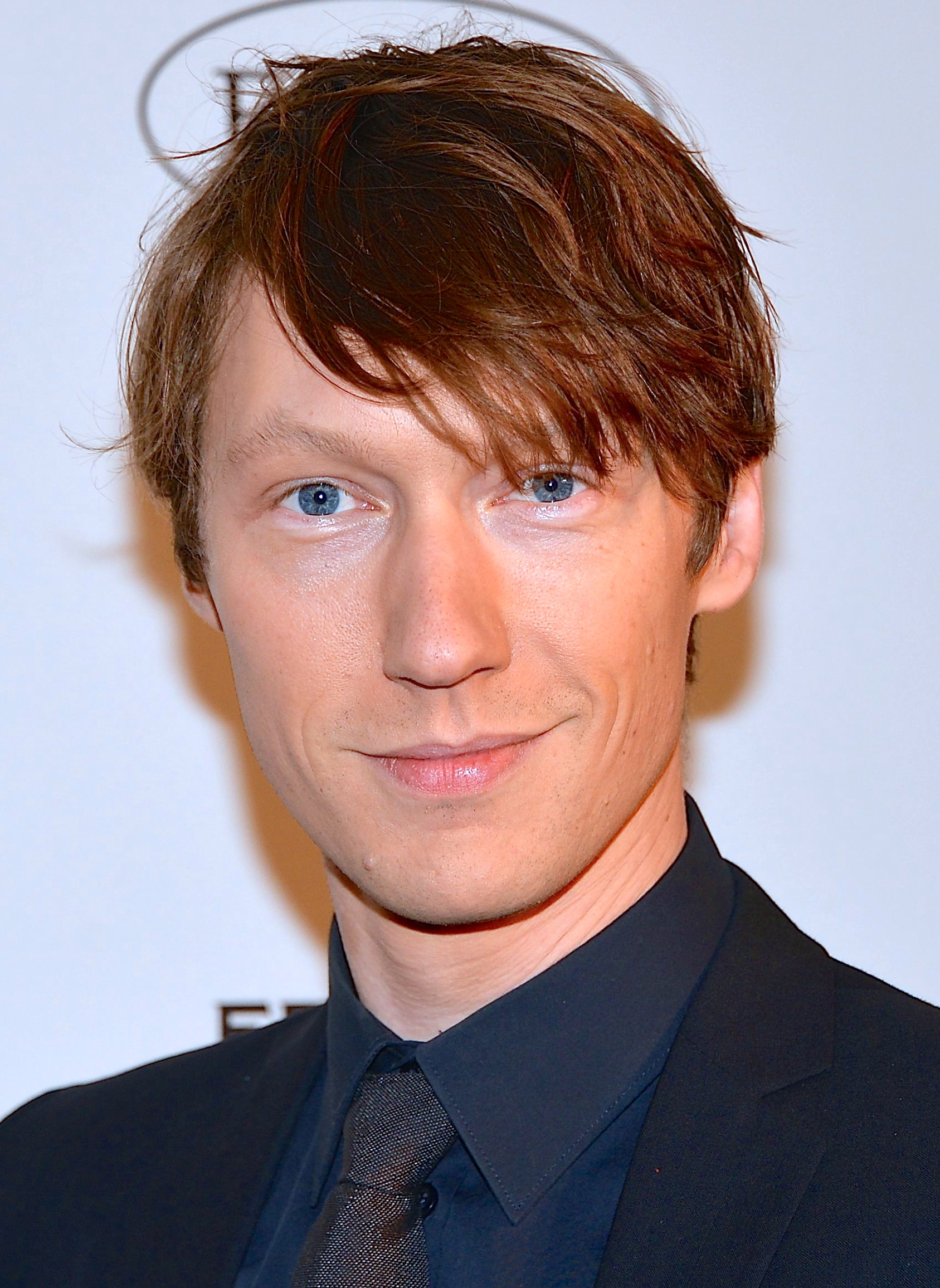
- Berger in 2013
- Born: Simon Jönsson Berger; 1 June 1979 (age 47); Stockholm, Sweden
- Education: Malmö Theatre Academy
- Occupation: Actor
- Parents: Bengt Berger; Gittan Jönsson

Simon Jönsson Berger, known as Simon J. Berger (born 1 June 1979) is a Swedish actor. He is the son of musician Bengt Berger and artist Gittan Jönsson. He grew up in Stockholm and in Österlen. He was educated at the Fridhem Folk High School and Malmö Theatre Academy, from which he graduated in 2007. Berger has also acted at Scen Österlen, Lunds Studentteater, Malmö Stadsteater and Royal Dramatic Theatre.

Berger became known to a wider Swedish audience by appearing in the 2007 television miniseries Upp till kamp, in which he played the leading role of Erik Westfeldt. He was given the role while he still studied at Teaterhögskolan.

Berger has also had the leading role in the Academy Award winning short film Istället för Abakadabra. He won a Prix d'Interprétation Masculine award at the Brussels Short Film Festival for that role. In 2010, he made his debut role at the Dramaten as Val Xavier in the play Mannen med Ormskinnsjackan.

In 2012, he played the character Paul in the Jonas Gardell series Don't Ever Wipe Tears Without Gloves. The series was broadcast on Swedish Television. He also had a leading role in the 2012 film Call Girl.

In 2015, he played Isak Aronson in TV 4's murder mystery miniseries Modus, which was screened in Australia by SBS and in the UK by BBC Four

From 2019 to 2023, Berger played Adam Vejle in Exit, a series in 3 seasons that described the decadent lives of 4 men in Oslo's finance elites. It became the most streamed in the history of Norwegian national television. His performance as a greedy mining director in the 2023 Norwegian historical drama The Riot was praised by Jan-Olov Andersson in Aftonbladet.

He appeared in the second season of The Hunters in 2021.
